= Beiler =

Beiler is a surname of German origin. Notable people with the surname include:

- Anna Fisher Beiler (1848–1904), British-born American missionary, newspaper editor
- Anne F. Beiler (born 1949), American businesswoman
- Egon Beiler (born 1953), Canadian sport wrestler
- Nadine Beiler (born 1990), Austrian singer

== See also ==
- Bieler
- Byler (disambiguation)
