= Bieler =

Bieler is a surname of German/Swiss origin, it finds its roots in the Low German word "bil", meaning "axe", German: habitational name for someone from Bielen in Thuringia, from any of several places called Bielau, in Silesia, or Biele on the Oder river

Variation: patronymic of the name Bieler. The name is based on Old High German billi 'sword, battle axe' and Old High German heri 'army' or Old High German harti, herti, Old Saxon 'hard, strong'. However, the given name is rarely used

surname include:

- Alexander Bieler (born 1992), now Alexander Mühling, German footballer
- Alfred Bieler (1923–2013), Swiss ice hockey player
- André Charles Biéler (1896–1989), Swiss-born Canadian painter and teacher
- Bruno Bieler (1888–1966), German general who commanded the LII Corps during World War II
- Christoph Bieler (born 1977), Austrian athlete competing in Nordic combined
- Claudio Bieler (born 1984), Argentine-born Ecuadorian footballer
- Dominik Bieler (born 2001), Swiss cyclist
- Ernest Biéler (1863–1948), Swiss painter, draughtsman and printmaker
- Etienne Bieler (1895–1929), Swiss-born Canadian physicist
- Franco Bieler (born 1950), Italian alpine skier
- Fritz Bieler (1895–1957), Mexican aviator
- Gustave Bieler DSO MBE (1904–1944), Special Operations Executive agent during World War II
- Helmut Bieler (1940–2019), German composer and pianist
- Henry G. Bieler (1893–1975), American physician, wrote the book Food is Your Best Medicine
- Ida Bieler, American violinist and professor of Violin
- Jason Bieler, American singer, guitarist and songwriter with hard rock band Saigon Kick
- Klaus-Dieter Bieler (born 1949), German athlete
- Larissa Bieler (born 1978), Swiss journalist
- Pascal Bieler (born 1986), German footballer
- Paula Bieler, (born 1988), former Swedish politician for the Sweden Democrats party
- Rüdiger Bieler (born 1955), German-American biologist
- Wanda Bieler (born 1959), Italian alpine skier

== See also ==
- Bieler Bros. Records, independent record label based out of Florida, USA
- Bieler See, lake in the west of Switzerland
- Bieler Tagblatt, Swiss German-language daily newspaper
- Beeler
- Belier
- Biller
- Bleiler
