= Eugenia Gibson =

American missionary and temperance leader

Eugenia Gibson (married name, Eugenia Mitchell; 1856/57 - 1945) was an American missionary and educator who lived in Albany, New York for most of her life. She was affiliated with the Woman's Foreign Missionary Society of the Methodist Episcopal Church and the Woman's Christian Temperance Union.

== Early life and education ==
Her father was Rev. David Gibson, of the New York Conference, Methodist Episcopal Church.

She pursued her studies in the schools located in the different towns and villages where her father was appointed pastor. Afterward, she entered a school in Albany, also the State Normal School in that city, from which she graduated.

== Career ==
A "farewell meeting" was held for Gibson in New York, on November 7, 1878 before she began her missionary work; she was twenty-two years old at the time. She explained how she had placed her application in the hands of the General Executive Committee at Boston, feeling that in so doing, she was committing herself. After news came that she was accepted, and would go to India within the year, a deep sense of responsibility and questioning began. She worried about her fitness to meet the physical demands of missionary life and her ability to acquire a difficult language.

Under the auspices of the Woman's Foreign Missionary Society of the Methodist Episcopal Church, she left for India before the end of the year and became a teacher at Isabella Thoburn's school in Lucknow, India. Florence Nickerson, of Cincinnati, was stationed in Lucknow at the same time, while Clara Swain, M.D. and Fannie Sparks were in Bareilly, S. A. Easton was in Cawnpore, M. E. Layton was in Calcutta, Mattie B. Spence was in Allahabad, Luella Kelly was in Moradabad, and Annie N. Budden was stationed in Pithoragarh.

In 1882, she was seriously ill. Upon returning to the U.S., she became missioner of Albany's Woman's Christian Temperance Union, a post which she filled for fourteen years.

Gibson was well-known in Nyack, New York, especially in the YWCA where she gave Bible readings. In Albany, for several years, she was in charge of a large Home Training School for Christian Workers.

== Personal life ==
On October 24, 1900, in Nyack, she married Rev. Charles B. Mitchell.

Eugenia Gibson Mitchell died March 16, 1945, age 88, in Albany, New York and was buried in the Albany Rural Cemetery.
