= Amelia Robertson Foss =

American Methodist leader

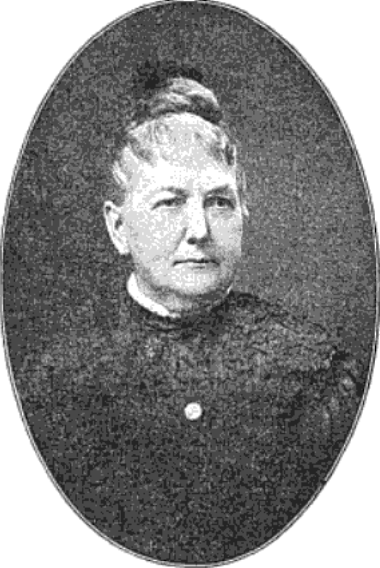
- Foss, from a 1926 publication
- Born: August 19, 1840; Peekskill, New York, U.S.
- Died: December 10, 1926 (aged 86); Wynnewood, Pennsylvania, U.S.
- Occupations: First president, Woman's Foreign Missionary Society of the Methodist Episcopal Church
- Spouse: Cyrus David Foss
- Relatives: Charles Franklin Robertson (brother)

Amelia Robertson Foss (August 19, 1840 – December 10, 1926) was an American Methodist leader. She was the first president of the Woman's Foreign Missionary Society of the Methodist Episcopal Church (WFMS), an office she held from 1897 to 1908.

== Early life ==
Robertson was born in Peekskill, New York, the daughter of James Robertson and Mary Ann Canfield Robertson. Her father was a Methodist Sunday school superintendent, and her brother Charles Franklin Robertson became an Episcopal bishop.

== Career ==
Foss was "first lady" of Wesleyan University while her husband was the university's president, from 1875 to 1880. She was the first president of the Woman's Foreign MIssionary Society of the Methodist Episcopal Church, beginning in 1897. She presided over the society's conventions, and toured in East Asia with her husband in 1906 and 1907. She was involved in overseeing Methodist Episcopal projects including a home for the aged, an orphanage, and a college fund. She retired from the WFMS presidency in 1908, and was the society's president emeritus after 1908. She was succeeded by another bishop's wife, Clotilda Lyon McDowell.

In 1871, Foss was a founding member of the board of directors of the Philadelphia Young Women's Christian Association; she remained a board member for over fifty years.

== Personal life ==
Robertson married widowed Methodist clergyman Cyrus David Foss in 1865. They had four children together; their youngest daughter died in infancy, and two of their children died in the 1910s. Her husband died in 1910, and she died in 1926, at the age of 86, in Wynnewood, Pennsylvania.
