= J-stroke =

J-stroke may refer to:

- J with stroke, a letter of the Latin alphabet
- The J-stroke, a canoe paddle stroke
- Stroke (journal), a medical journal
- Journal of Stroke & Cerebrovascular Diseases, a medical journal
