= Lucilla Green Cheney =

American physician; missionary (1853–1878)

- Born: Lucilla Holcomb Green; July 15, 1853; Lambertville, New Jersey
- Died: September 28, 1878 (aged 25); Bareilly, India
- Education: Women's Medical College of Pennsylvania
- Occupations: physician, Christian missionary

Lucilla Green Cheney, M.D. (July 15, 1853 – September 30, 1878) was an American medical doctor and Christian missionary. Beginning in 1876, she served a medical mission in Bareilly, British India under the Woman's Foreign Missionary Society of the Methodist Episcopal Church. She died of cholera two years into her mission.

== Early life and education ==
Lucilla Holcomb Green was born, July 15, 1853, at Lambertville, New Jersey. She was the daughter of Reverend Enoch Green and Martha A. Green, of the New Jersey Conference of the Methodist Episcopal Church.

Cheney was chiefly educated at home, where she studied the English branches and Latin, assisted by her father. At the age of fifteen, she entered Pennington Seminary, New Jersey, where she was reportedly a successful student and leader. She began studying medicine under private tutors, and in the fall of 1871, she entered the Woman's Medical College of Pennsylvania, where she graduated with the first honors of the class in March, 1875. After graduating, she worked as an assistant physician at the college's hospital for several months.

== Career ==
Prior to serving her mission in 1876, there is no record that Cheney had felt called to missionary work. However, in a diary kept by her while at Pennington Seminary she makes the following entry, after hearing a sermon by Rev. S. Parker, then stationed at Pennington:— "Jan. 10, 1869-Mr. Parker's sermon was better than usual to-day-a missionary sermon. He made a strong appeal to the young to consecrate themselves to the missionary work. I wonder if I will ever feel it my duty to wander on the plains under an Indian sun, or mingle with China's strange inhabitants to teach of Jesus? If it is ever my lot, may I be willing and cheerful, remembering all Jesus has done for me!” She did not, however, enter upon the study of medicine with a view to this work.

At the annual meeting of the General Executive Committee in Washington, D.C., in May 1876, reference was made to Green's call to the missionary work, and, on invitation of the committee, Mrs. Taplin gave an account of the manner in which Green was found. Clara Swain, M.D., whose health was suffering from overwork, need to be relieved and her place filled by a competent person, where or how to be obtained she could not tell. Many unsuccessful attempts were made to secure a medical missionary but after her attention was directed to Green, Taplin wrote to her. The first reply was a negative, Taplin was convinced that Green would change her mind. She did not wish to urge her, but, selecting two quotations from missionaries in the field, one from a letter from Mrs. Parker, the other from a letter written by Miss Sparkes, without note or comment, she sent them to her. After reading them, and consulting with her parents, Green decided to accept and wrote to Taplin,— "I am willing to go, and do the best I can."

After making the necessary arrangements, Cheney sailed from New York City for India, January 1, 1876, and arrived at Bombay on February 25. She was accompanied by Rev. Nathan Gilbert Cheney (1840–1904) of the Missionaries of the Parent Board, whom she would later marry. Rev. Cheney was embarking on a mission to Nynee Tal, India, to head an English congregation. After a short rest, Cheney passed on to Bareilly, and entered at once upon the work to which she had been assigned. Her work here was one of grave responsibility, and especially so for one so young and inexperienced. Her time here was almost wholly taken up with the duties of her medical profession, she often having from 40 to 50 patients in attendance at her morning clinics to examine and prescribe for.

== Private life ==
On January 24, 1878, (Note: According to Gracey (1881), they married in 1877.) Cheney married Rev. Cheney, in the Mission Chapel at Bareilly. She then removed from the medical work in Bareilly to Nynee Tal where assisted her husband in his work and regularly accompanied him on his parish visits. She was interested in all that pertained to the comfort of the people about her. She superintended the work among the native women, instructed and helped the Bible women, and entered into her profession as a physician. Writing from Nainee Tal she said:— MMedical work being a new thing in the hands of a lady, has opened up slowly, however I have had considerable to do within the last two months... I have converted a part of one of the closets in my house into a little dispensary, and receive patients here, visiting them also at their homes. The principal druggist of the place has made most liberal terms for furnishing medicines, and filling out prescriptions, and I find the patients very willing to procure their own medicines."

== Death ==
Cheney contracted cholera on September 28, 1878, and died two days later, September 30th, at Nynee Tal, India. She was buried near the grave of Sarah Minerva Rockwell Thoburn, first wife of Rev. James Mills Thoburn.
