= Byler =

Byler is name of Swiss-German origin and may refer to:

- Eric Byler (born 1972), an American film director, screenwriter and political activist
- Byler Road, the oldest public road in Alabama still in use today
- Byler Amish, an Amish subgroup, founded in 1849
- Bankston, Alabama, formerly called Byler

== See also ==
- Byler, a fandom name for the relationship between the characters Mike Wheeler and Will Byers from Stranger Things, also known as Miwi.
- Beiler, a surname
