= Mary Osburn Adkinson =

American temperance reformer (1843–1918)

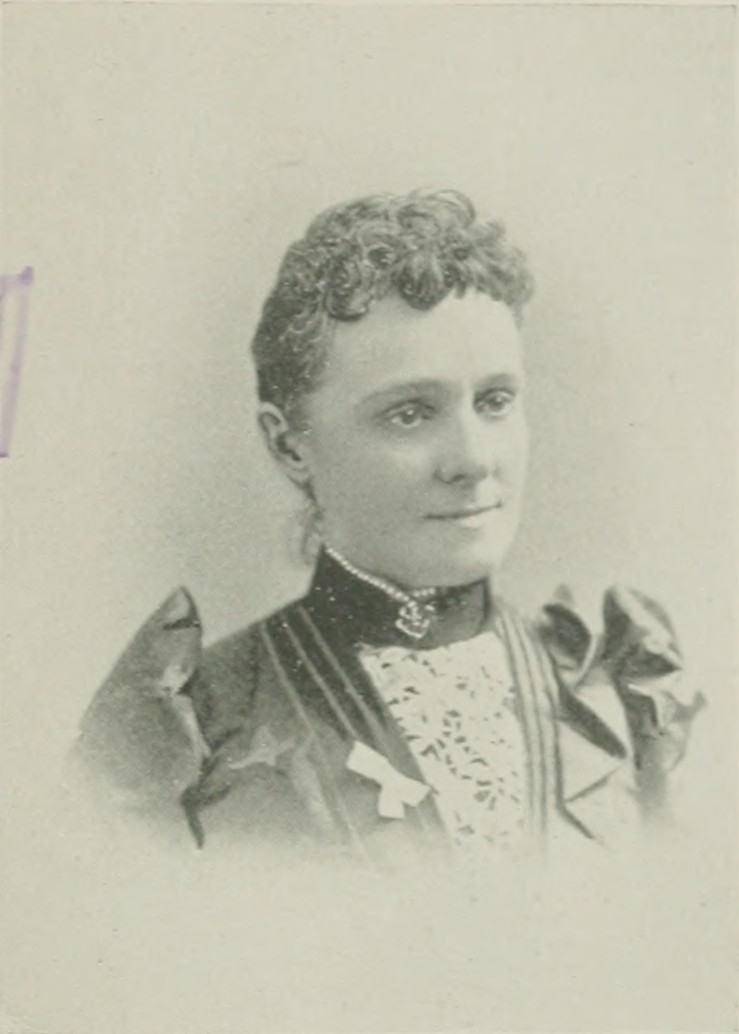
- "A Woman of the Century"
- Born: Mary Almira Osburn; July 28, 1843; Rush County, Indiana, U.S.
- Died: 1918 (aged 74–75); Jacksonville, Florida, U.S.
- Occupation: social reformer
- Employer: New Orleans University
- Organizations: Woman's Foreign Missionary Society of the Methodist Episcopal Church; Woman's Christian Temperance Union
- Spouse: Lewis Gould Adkinson (m. 1863; died 1906)

Mary Osburn Adkinson (July 28, 1843 – 1918) was an American social reformer active in the temperance movement. She took a leading part in the organization of the Woman's Foreign Missionary Society of the Methodist Episcopal Church in Madison, Wisconsin, serving four times as its elected president. In Louisiana, she held the position of superintendent of the Woman's Christian Temperance Union (WCTU) and matron in the New Orleans University.

== Early life and education ==
Mary Almira Osburn was born in Rush County, Indiana, July 28, 1843. Her father was Harmon Osburn, who was a prominent farmer in the county. Her mother often entertained ministers, teachers and others in her home.

Adkinson was educated in Whitewater College, Centerville, Indiana.

== Career ==
On July 8, 1863, she married the Rev. Lewis Gould Adkinson, D. D. (1838–1906), who went on to become President of New Orleans University. She began her married life as a pastor's wife in Laurel, Indiana. There, by teaching a part of the time, she supplemented the small salary received by her husband and added many valuable books to their library. Removing to Madison, Wisconsin, she was persuaded to take a leading part in organizing the Woman's Foreign Missionary Society of the Methodist Episcopal Church in that city. For ten or twelve years, she was very active in that work. Four times, she was unanimously elected president of the Madison district association. She was the association's delegate in 1883 to the Wisconsin State convention, and in 1884, to the branch meeting in Kalamazoo, Michigan.

In 1873, she united with the temperance women of the city in the woman's crusade and was thereafter actively engaged in temperance work. She became superintendent of the WCTU among African Americans in Louisiana. Many societies were organized and hundreds of young people took the pledge of abstinence from intoxicating drink, tobacco and profanity.

Adkinson served as matron in New Orleans University while also teaching sewing and dressmaking.

After relocating to Jacksonville, Florida, for seven years, she served as president of its branch of the WCTU.

== Personal life ==
Mr. and Mrs. Adkinson had five children.

After an illness of 18 months, Mary Adkinson died at her daughter's home in Jacksonville, Florida, June 29, 1918. (Note: According to the Dearborn County Register (August 8, 1918), Adkinson died June 20, 1918.) Interment was in the family lot in Westview Cemetery, Atlanta, Georgia.
