= Julia Lore McGrew =

Argentine-born American physician; medical missionary (1849–1942)

Dr. Julia Lore McGrew M.D.
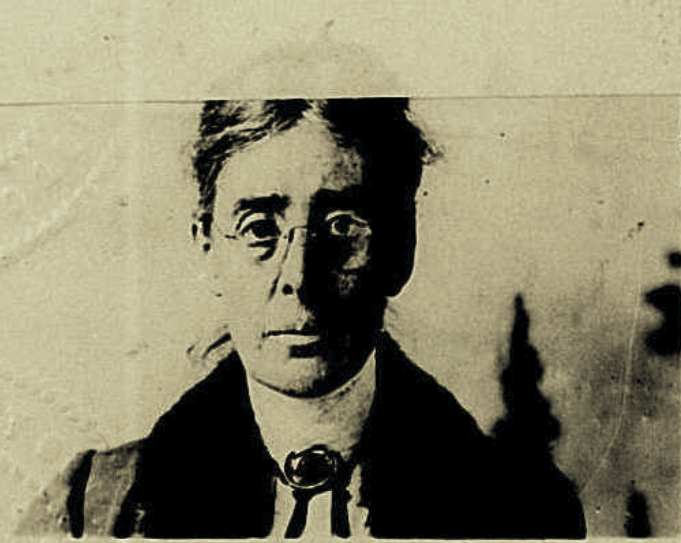
- U.S. passport photo, 1920
- Born: Anna Julia Lore; June 17, 1849; Buenos Aires, Argentina
- Died: February 5, 1942 (aged 92); Washington, D.C.
- Education: University of Michigan
- Occupations: physician; medical missionary
- Medical career
- Field: Women's health
- Institutions: Woman's Foreign Missionary Society of the Methodist Episcopal Church

Julia Lore McGrew (1849–1942) was an American physician and medical missionary in India. Affiliated with the Woman's Foreign Missionary Society of the Methodist Episcopal Church, she was, in 1876, the first to provide medical missionary services in Moradabad.

== Early life and education ==
Anna Julia Lore was born in Buenos Aires, Argentina, June 17, 1849. Her father, Dallas Dayton Lore, D.D. (1815–1875), joined the Philadelphia Conference of the Methodist Episcopal Church in 1837. In 1840, he was nominated as a missionary to Africa, but circumstances prevented his entering upon the work. In 1847, he went as a missionary to Buenos Aires, where, two years after, Julia was born. McGrew's mother, Rebecca (née, Toy) (1819–1903), accompanied her husband to Buenos Aires, and here they remained seven years. Julia's siblings were Isaiah, Dallas, Elizabeth, and Frank.

After founding the Methodist mission, Dr. Lore returned from Buenos Aires, and was sent upon a tour of observation in New Mexico Territory, with a view to the establishment of a mission in that Territory, after which he entered the pastorate. In 1864, he was elected editor of the Northern Christian Advocate (Auburn, New York, which position he held until his death.

It was while in the city of Buffalo, New York and when about twelve years of age, that Julia joined "Grace Church", of which her father was pastor. From that time, she was particularly interested Christian missionary work, and began teaching a class of young girls in a German Mission School. As she grew to maturity, her interest in mission work increased.

She spent some time in preparatory work in Clifton Springs, afterward in the medical college in Philadelphia, and three years at the medical school of the University of Michigan at Ann Arbor, Michigan, graduating in 1873, with the first class that included women. Subsequently, she spent nine months at the Woman's Hospital, in Boston.

== Career ==
In 1874, then living in Auburn, New York, she offered herself to the Woman's Foreign Missionary Society. At the executive committee held in Philadelphia in the spring of 1874, she was accepted as medical missionary for India, sent out by the New York Branch. With her parents, she attended the International Camp-meeting, held at Round Lake, New York in July 1874.

McGrew sailed from the port of New York, October 20, 1874. She reached her destination in December, in time to the Annual Conference. Immediately after the close of Conference, McGrew proceeded to Moradabad. She at once commenced the study of the language, made herself familiar with the customs and habits of the people, and soon made frequent professional visits. But as the days passed, it was found necessary, in order to reach the women more effectually, to have a dispensary. She succeeded in renting a property in the native city centrally located, and well adapted to their needs. This building was opened in March 1875, and by July 1, 400 patients had been prescribed for at the building, and a great number of professional visits were made to the city and villages.

The record of the first eight months of medical work given in the Annual Report of 1875, was 840 patients treated at Dispensary; and 1,780 prescriptions compounded. At the Mission House, about 400 cases were prescribed for, and in the city, about 100 houses had been visited, with an average of three patients in each house. Once a week, McGrew visited a Muslim neighborhood that had a girls' school. Here sick women and children were treated. Visits were also made to other neighborhoods, where medicines were in great demand from all sorts of people, particularly during the hot season. Over 1,170 patients were registered that year as visiting the Dispensary, and over 2,000 prescriptions dispensed. In the Annual Report of 1876, McGrew stated, "that increased familiarity with the people in their everyday life and habits of thought, have increased our opportunities for more direct Missionary effort. In several instances, the visits of the Doctor have opened the doors of the zenanas to the Bible women, and regular instruction is being given in many families of the highest caste."

On September 11, 1876, she married the Rev. George Harrison McGrew (1846–1917), whom she had met in the U.S. before leaving for India, and who was afterward sent out as a missionary by the parent Board. After marriage, she continued her medical missionary work.

After serving in Moradabad three years, in house and zenana practice, and extending her work to neighboring villages which she visited, McGrew took charge of the medical work at Bareilly, where she had to contend with flood, famine, and pestilence until 1880. She then spent three years in Cawnpore (1880–1883).

The family returned to the U.S. in 1883. In 1886, they were living in Meriden, Connecticut. where Rev. McGrew was pastor of the First Methodist Episcopal church.

== Personal life ==
The couple had four children: James (b. 1877), Elizabeth (b. 1878), Dallas (b. 1882), and Bessie (b. 1883).

Julia McGrew died at her home in Washington, D.C., February 5, 1942, and was buried at Kingwood, West Virginia.

== Selected works ==
- "Concerning Mothers-in-Law and Daughters-in-Law", The Female missionary intelligencer, 1878
- "The Goddess Kali and Her Worshipers", The Heathen Woman's Friend, 1888.
- "Trees in Legend and History", Woman's Missionary Friend, 1913
