= Louise L. Chase =

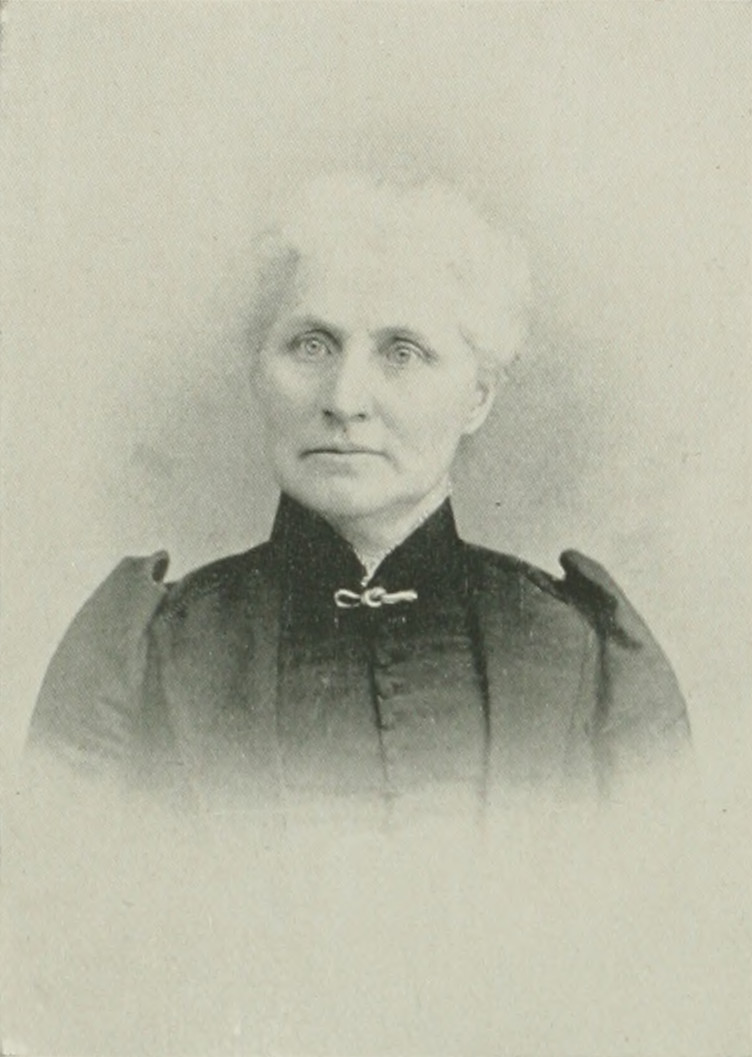
"A Woman of the Century"

Louise L. Chase (née Bond; September 2, 1840 – September 19, 1906) was an American social reformer. She was elected president of the Woman's Christian Temperance Union (W.C.T.U.) of Middletown, Rhode Island, and elected president of the Woman's Foreign Missionary Society of the Methodist Episcopal Church in Newport, Rhode Island.

== Biography ==
Louise L. Bond was born in Warren, Massachusetts, September 2, 1840. She was a daughter of Samuel Bond (1796-1873) and Mary (Damon) Bond (1803-?). Louise had three siblings, John, Maria, and Samuel.

Soon after her birth, her parents moved to Brimfield, Massachusetts, where she received her education, entering the Hitchcock free high school at the age of 13. Her attendance in that school was interrupted by a temporary residence in Columbia, Connecticut, where she attended a private school. She returned to Brimheld and finished her course at the age of 16.

In 1857, she took up her residence in Lebanon, Connecticut, and there married, in 1861, Alfred W. Chase, a native of Bristol, Rhode Island. Mr. and Mrs. Chase soon removed to Brooklyn, Connecticut, and in 1882, to Middletown, Rhode Island, the home of Mr. Chase's family.

The W.C.T.U. of Middletown was organized in 1882 and Chase was elected one of the vice-presidents. In 1885, she was elected president of the W.C.T.U. of Middletown, and in that way became prominent in the work. She was elected State vice-president of the W.C.T.U., and at about the same time, State superintendent of the department of Sabbath observance. In 1886, she represented the State in the National Convention in Minneapolis, Minnesota. She was elected, in 1891, State superintendent of scientific temperance instruction in schools.

Chase was affiliated with the New England branch of the Woman's Foreign Missionary Society of the Methodist Episcopal Church. Shortly before her death, she was elected president of that organization in Newport, Rhode Island. Louise L. Chase died in Newport, September 19, 1906.
