= Nancie Monelle =

American physician

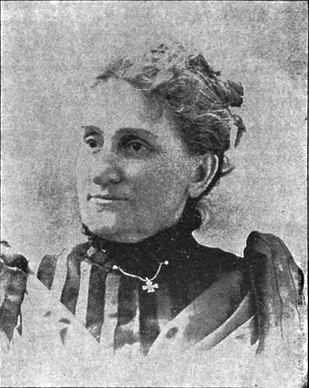
Nancie Monelle Mansell, M.D.

Nancie Monelle Mansell (née, Monelle; 1841–1903) was an American physician. She was the second physician sent out by the Woman's Foreign Missionary Society of the Methodist Episcopal Church, and the first woman doctor who went out alone as a missionary into an Indian Princely State. Mansell fought against Indian baby marriages, pleading that the marriageable age of girls be raised to 14 years.

== Biography ==
Nancie Monelle was born in 1841 in New York City. Her paternal ancestors belonged to the ancient family of Monelle, of the province of Tours, France. Her great-grandfather came to America with the young Marquis de Lafayette, and, admiring the country very much, did not return to France. Her father, an accomplished scholar, died while she was an infant.

Monelle was the second physician sent out by the Woman's Foreign Missionary Society of the Methodist Episcopal Church, and Lucknow was the second city in India occupied by a woman medical missionary, at least of the Methodist Church. She had graduated from the Vassar College, and in 1872 from the New York Medical College and Hospital for Women, taking first prize in surgery. After a year of hospital and private practice in New York City, she was sent to India in 1873 and appointed to Lucknow. Her profession opened the way into houses that had never been entered by a Christian. At the end of the first year she accepted an invitation to Hyderabad, Deccan, having withdrawn from the Mission, and refunded her passage and outfit money. She was the first lady doctor who ever went out alone into a Princely state. The ruler of the province furnished elephants, a regiment of sepoys, and a band of music to escort her to the palaces of the various noblemen of the city.

At the expiration of three years, having established a dispensary and hospital, and treated over 40,000 patients, besides having an important private practice among the nawabs and nobles, she married Rev. Dr. Henry Mansell, of the General Missionary Society, and returned with him to the Northwest Provinces. In 1880, they removed to Moradabad. The year 1890 will be memorable for the great agitation regarding baby marriages. Such revelations of inhumanity had been brought to light that Dr. Mansell drew up a petition, which was cheerfully signed by 55 woman physicians, and was presented to the Viceroy and Governor-General, pleading that the marriageable age of girls be raised to 14 years. The 13 instances—only a few out of many hundreds— given in the petition, of cruel wrongs, deaths, and maimings for life received by helpless child-wives at the hands of brutal husbands, which had come under her personal observation or that of her associates, were horrible almost beyond belief. While the Government was flooded with petitions and memorials from native Christians, Hindu women, and missionaries, it is stated that nearly all the speakers in the Legislative Council referred to the facts presented in this memorial, which had great influence in bringing about the change of raising the age to 12 years (not 14, as asked), "possibly the most important step taken in the domestic and social life of the people since the abolishment of suttee, in 1829."

== Bibliography ==
- Baker, Frances J. (1895). The Story of the Woman's Foreign Missionary Society of the Methodist Episcopal Church, 1869-1895 (Public domain ed.). Curts & Jennings. p. 137.
- Wheeler, Mary Sparkes (1881). First Decade of the Woman's Foreign Missionary Society of the Methodist Episcopal Church: With Sketches of Its Missionaries (Public domain ed.). Phillips & Hunt. p. 153.
