= Freedmen's Aid Society =

Educational group for the Southern US

The Freedmen's Aid Society was founded in 1859 during the American Civil War by the American Missionary Association (AMA), a group supported chiefly by the Congregational, Presbyterian and Methodist churches in the North. It organized a supply of teachers from the North and provided housing for them, to set up and teach in schools in the South for freedmen and their children. The AMA founded a total of more than 500 schools and colleges for freedmen in the South after the war, so that freedmen could be educated as teachers, nurses and other professionals.

The work of the Society accelerated with the end of the war and the beginning of the Reconstruction era. Education for freedmen was seen as a top priority among both blacks and whites. The Society was supported by a variety of religious groups and denominations, and it began work in the South three months after organizing. By the end of the first year, it had recruited 52 instructors. The teachers instructed more than 5,000 students in 59 schools. The schools were open to men, women, and children in the South. By the turn of the century, blacks had raised their rate of literacy by an amazing amount; it was a major success story since the end of the war. By then the Democratic-dominated state legislatures had imposed racial segregation and were underfunding black schools and other facilities.

Leadership and control of the Freedmen's Aid Society has been attributed to both the Congregational and the Methodist Episcopal churches. The Methodist version of the Society's history states that it was founded in 1866. It was "directed by a Board of Managers who were elected by the (Methodist) General Conference." In 1920 it was reorganized and renamed the Board of Education for Negroes, and in 1939 absorbed into the Board of Education of the Methodist Church.

== Notable people ==
- Ednah Dow Littlehale Cheney
- Anna Fisher Beiler
- Richard S. Rust

== See also ==
- Freedmen's town
- History of slavery in the United States
