= Clara Swain Hospital =

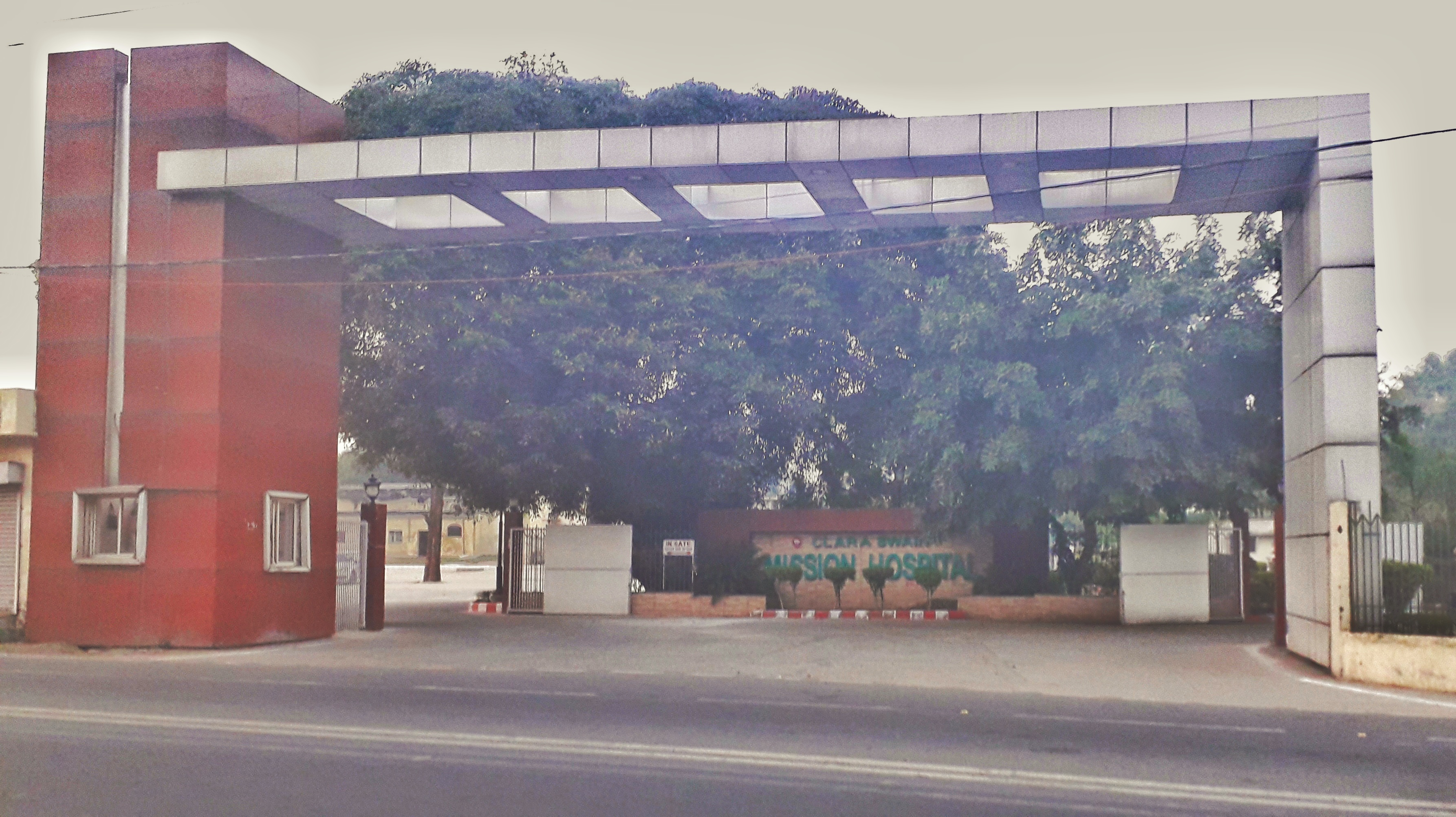
- Entry gate of Clara Swain Hospital

Geography
- Location: Bareilly, India

History
- Opened: early 1870s

Links
- Lists: Hospitals in India

The Clara Swain Hospital is a hospital located in Bareilly, India. It was founded by Dr. Clara Swain in the early 1870s to provide focused medical care to women and children. Presently, the Clara Swain Hospital remains the "oldest and largest Methodist hospital in India." At the pinnacle of the hospital's career, 350 patient beds were in use, and an active community outreach program was in place. Additionally, it was the lead institution for nursing education in Northern India. However, by 1998, the hospital had acquired great debt and had only 30 patients in attendance. Subsequently, debate sprung over the decision to officially close the hospital, under the Methodist Church in India.

== History ==
Efforts to revive the hospital were supported by the newly assigned hospital director, Lillian Wallace, and a qualification for a hospital revitalization program, funded by the General Board of Global Ministries. As a result, in 2001, it was reported that the hospital had undergone several renewal projects and as well as an increase in medical equipment, staff, and patients. Additionally, a separate grant was provided by the Women's Division of the General Board of Global Ministries to augment the nursing school's facilities. As of 2006, the hospital has designated a wing to diagnose and treat HIV/AIDS patients.

The hospital was given on lease by the leaders of the Methodist Church in India, North India Regional Conference to a local businessman in 2011.
