= José Biller =

American-Uruguayan neurologist

José Biller is an Uruguayan born, American neurologist focused on stroke and cerebrovascular disorders.

As of 2026, he's a professor and chairperson of the department of neurology at Loyola University Chicago, Stritch School of Medicine.

He is the emeritus editor-in-chief of Journal of Stroke & Cerebrovascular Diseases, a foreign academic correspondent of the National Academy of Medicine in Uruguay, a fellow of the Mexican Academy of Neurology and an honorary member of the Chilean Society of Neurology, Psychiatry and Neurosurgery.

== Career ==
Biller served as the director of the American Board of Psychiatry and Neurology (ABPN) from 1994 to 2001, and as the president of the ABPN in 2001.

As of 2026, Biller is the emeritus director of the ABPN.

== Education ==
Biller received his medical degree from the School of Medicine at the University of the Republic in Montevideo, Uruguay. He completed residency in Neurology at Loyola University Chicago and a fellowship in cerebrovascular research at Wake Forest University, Bowman Gray School of Medicine.

As of 2026, he has given more than 700 lectures and presentations internationally, has published more than 600 scientific articles and studies, and has edited and/or authored more than 30 books.

His awards included:

- The American Neurological Association Distinguished Neurology Teacher Award (2013)
- The American Academy of Neurology A.B. Baker Lifetime Award for Teaching in Neurology (2020)
- The American Heart Association William M. Feinberg Award for Excellence in Clinical Stroke (2023)
