= Biller =

Biller is an Anglo Saxon and German surname, and it's a variant of Buhler. Notable people with the surname include:

- Anna Biller, independent American filmmaker
- Georg Christoph Biller (1955–2022), German choral conductor of the Thomanerchor
- John Biller (1879–1960), American athlete who competed mainly in the standing jumps
- José Biller, American cardiologist
- Kenneth Biller, TV producer, TV writer, TV director and TV editor, best known for Star Trek: Voyager
- Maxim Biller (born 1960), German writer
- Nigel Biller (born 1967), British illustrator, writer and musician
- Nikola Biller-Andorno, German bioethicist
- Stefanie Biller (born 1985), long-distance swimmer from Germany
