= Woman's Foreign Missionary Society of the Methodist Episcopal Church =

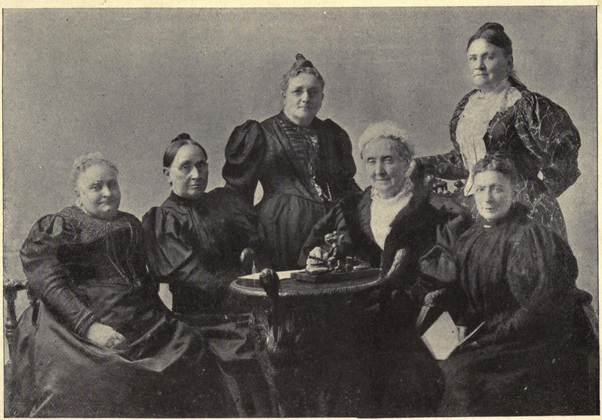
- Founders: Mrs. Thomas Rich, Mrs. E. W. Parker, Mrs. Thomas Kingsbury, Mrs. William Merrill, Mrs. William Butler, Mrs. Lewis Flanders
- Abbreviation: WFMS of the MEC
- Formation: March 1869
- Legal status: incorporated under the laws of the State of New York in 1884
- Headquarters: Boston, Massachusetts
- Location: United States
- Origins: Tremont Street Methodist Episcopal Church
- Services: women missionaries to foreign countries
- Main organ: The Heathen Woman's Friend
- Parent organization: Methodist Episcopal Church

Woman's Foreign Missionary Society of the Methodist Episcopal Church (acronym WFMS of the MEC) was one of three Methodist organizations in the United States focused on women's foreign missionary services; the two others were the WFMS of the Free Methodist Church of North America and the WFMS of the Methodist Protestant Church.

The WFMS of the MEC was founded in the Tremont Street Methodist Episcopal Church, in Boston, Massachusetts, March 1869, and incorporated under the laws of the State of New York in 1884. Its fields of operation included: Europe (Bulgaria, Italy, France); Latin America (Mexico, Argentina, Peru, Uruguay); Asia (Malaysia, China, Korea, India, Japan, The Philippines); and Africa (Algeria, Angola, Portuguese East Africa, Rhodesia, Tunis).

== History ==
WMFS was organized in March 1869 at the Tremont Street Methodist Episcopal Church in Boston, by eight women who responded to a call sent to thirty churches. The eight founders were, Mrs. Lewis Flanders; Mrs. Thomas Kingsbury; Mrs. William B. Merrill; Lois Lee Parker; Mrs. Thomas A. Rich; Mrs. H.J. Stoddard; Mrs. William Butler (Clementina Rowe Butler); and Mrs. P.T. Taylor. A window in the Tremont Street Church commemorates the event and preserves their names.

The first public meeting of the society was held in the Bromfield Street MEC, May 26, 1869. The discussion was quickly followed by decisive action. At a business meeting held by the women at the close of the public occasion, it was voted to raise money to send as a missionary to India, Isabella Thoburn, sister of Bishop James Mills Thoburn. An appeal for a medical woman soon followed. As a result of prompt and efficient measures to procure funds, the services of Isabella Thoburn and of Clara Swain, M.D., were secured.

These two women sailed from New York City for India, via England, on November 3, 1869, reaching their destination early in January, 1870. They were cordially received, and soon entered upon their work, Thoburn organizing schools and superintending the work of Bible readers, and Swain's medical ability gaining for her admission to many places that were closed to others. This society sent to India, China, Korea, and Japan the first woman medical missionary ever received in those countries.

By 1903, its 34th year, it had 265 missionaries carrying on its work in India, China, Japan, Korea, Africa, Bulgaria, Italy, South America, Mexico, and the Philippines, by means of women's colleges, high schools, seminaries, hospitals, dispensaries, day schools, and "settlement work".

Its receipts during the first year were US$4,546, and in the year 1903, US$491,091, with a total from the beginning of US$6,850,853. Six branches were organized the first year. By 1903, there were eleven, the first being the New England, and the eleventh being the Columbia River Branch.

== Publications ==
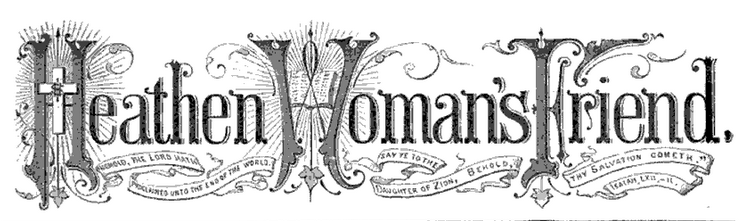
Logo of The Heathen Woman's Friend, the society's periodical

The first number of the society's first periodical, The Heathen Woman's Friend, appeared in June, 1869, with Harriet Merrick Warren as its editor for 24 years. Other publications were established later on.

== WFMS of other Methodist denominations ==
Other Methodist denominations developed their own women's foreign missionary organizations.

The WFMS of the Methodist Protestant Church was established in 1879. Its office was in Catonsville, Maryland. Its focused on Asia, especially China and Japan. It issued the periodical, The Woman's Missionary Record. Notable people included Mrs. E. C. Chandler, Mrs. Henry Hupfield, Mrs. D. S. Stephens, Mrs. L. K. East, and Mrs. J. F. McCulloch.

The WFMS of the Free Methodist Church of North America was established in 1882. Its office was in Oneida, New York. It issued the periodical, Missionary Tidings. Notable people included Mary L. Coleman, Mrs. C. T. Bolles, and Lillian C. Jensen.

== Notable people ==
- Mary Osburn Adkinson
- Esther E. Baldwin
- Annie Maria Barnes
- Susan Hammond Barney
- Anna Fisher Beiler
- Anna Smeed Benjamin
- Martia L. Davis Berry
- Jennie M. Bingham
- Sophia Blackmore
- Ariel Serena Hedges Bowen
- Maria Kane Brown
- Adda Burch
- Louise L. Chase
- Lucilla Green Cheney
- Lucinda L. Combs
- Emily M. J. Cooley
- Mary Helen Peck Crane
- Allie Luse Dick
- Hü King Eng
- Amelia Robertson Foss
- Mary Porter Gamewell
- Jennie Margaret Gheer
- Eugenia Gibson
- Annie Ryder Gracey
- Lucinda Barbour Helm
- Maria Hyde Hibbard
- Louise Manning Hodgkins
- Gertrude Howe
- Clotilda Lyon McDowell
- Julia Lore McGrew
- Caroline Elizabeth Merrick
- Mary A. Miller
- Nancie Monelle
- Cornelia Moore Chillson Moots
- Mary Clarke Nind
- Esther Pak
- Anna Campbell Palmer
- Rebecca Parrish
- Alice E. Heckler Peters
- Mary Q. Porter
- Mary Reed
- Jane Bancroft Robinson
- Elizabeth Russell
- Mary F. Scranton
- Liang May Seen
- Cora E. Simpson
- Susan J. Swift Steele
- Ōyama Sutematsu
- Clara Swain
- Lucy Robbins Messer Switzer
- Isabella Thoburn
- Mary Sparkes Wheeler
- Charlotte Frances Wilder
- Zara A. Wilson
- Annie Turner Wittenmyer
- Dora E. Schoonmaker
- Augusta Dickrson

== Gallery ==
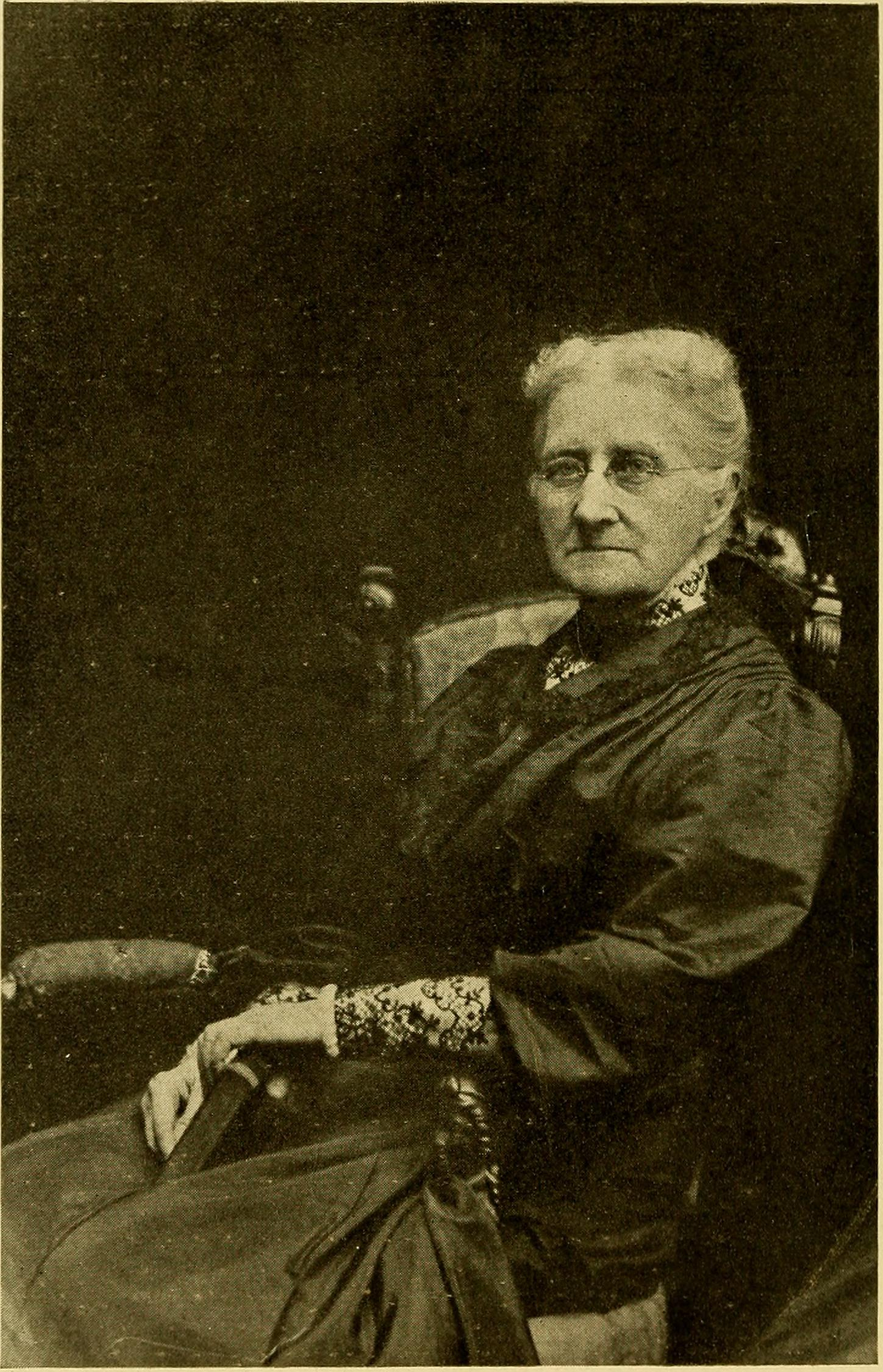
Dr. Clara Swain

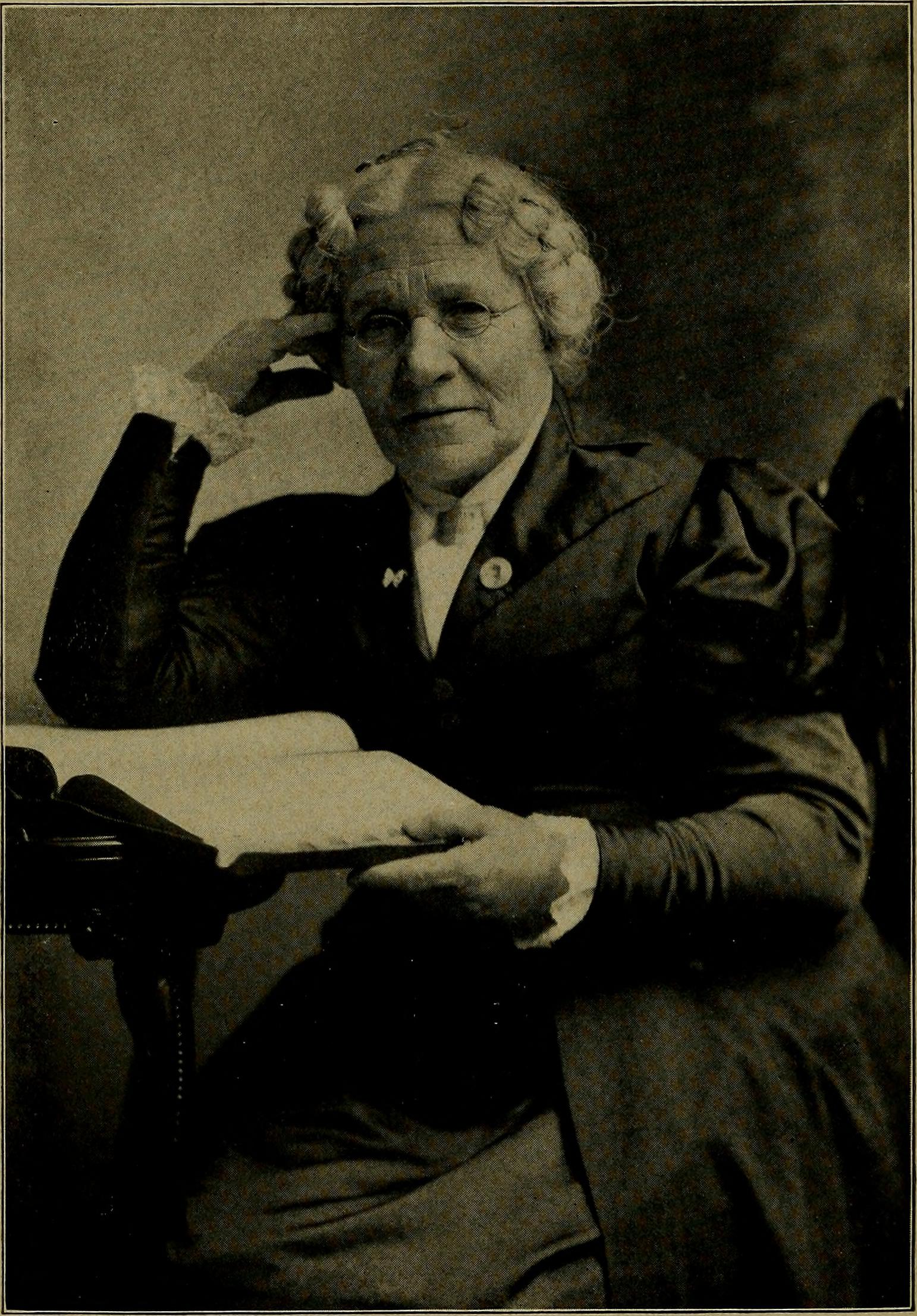
Mary Clarke Nind

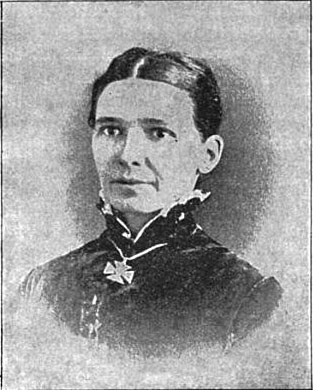
Sigourney Trask

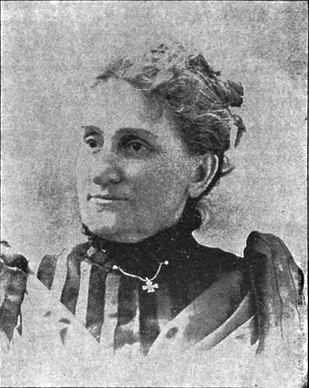
Nancie Monelle Mansell

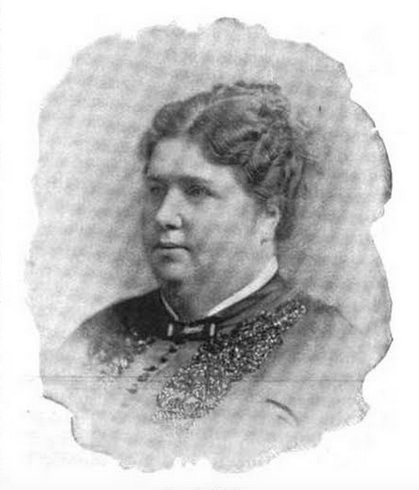
Anna Fisher Beiler

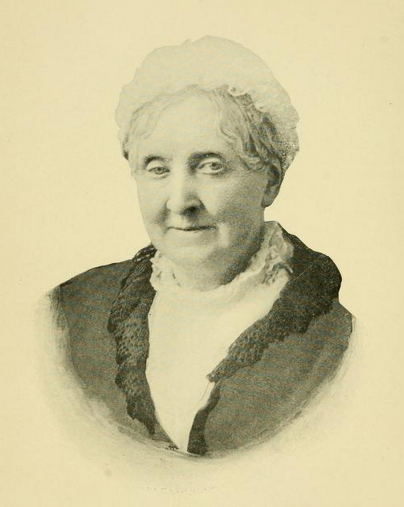
Clementina Rowe Butler

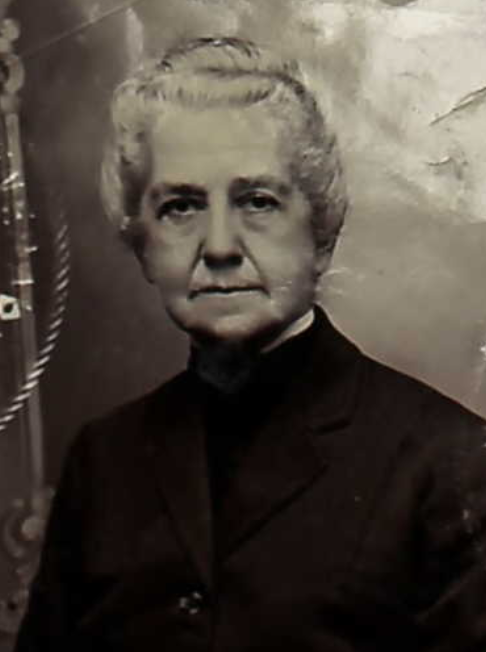
Gertrude Howe

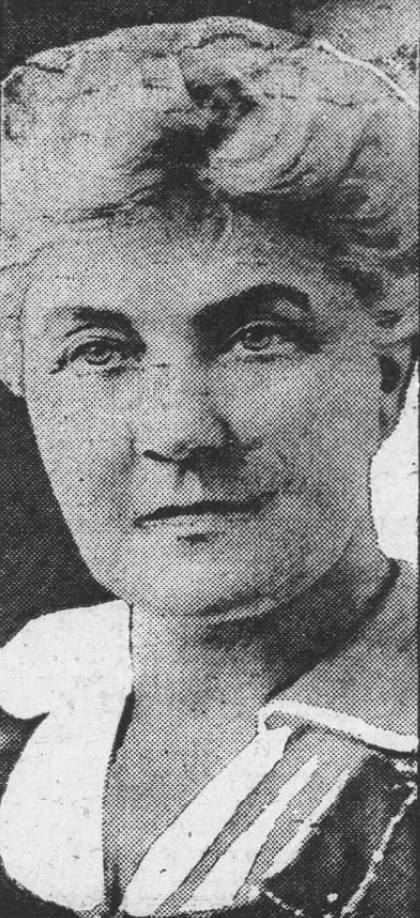
Clotilda Lyon McDowell

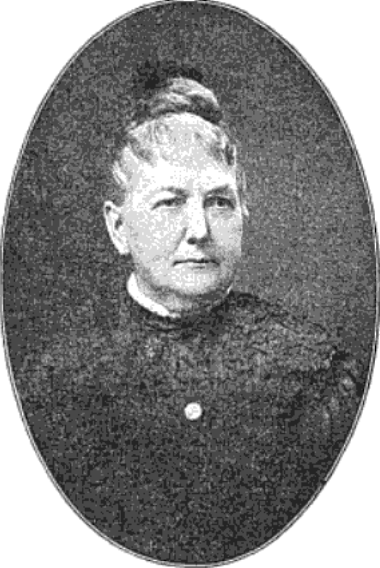
Amelia Robertson Foss

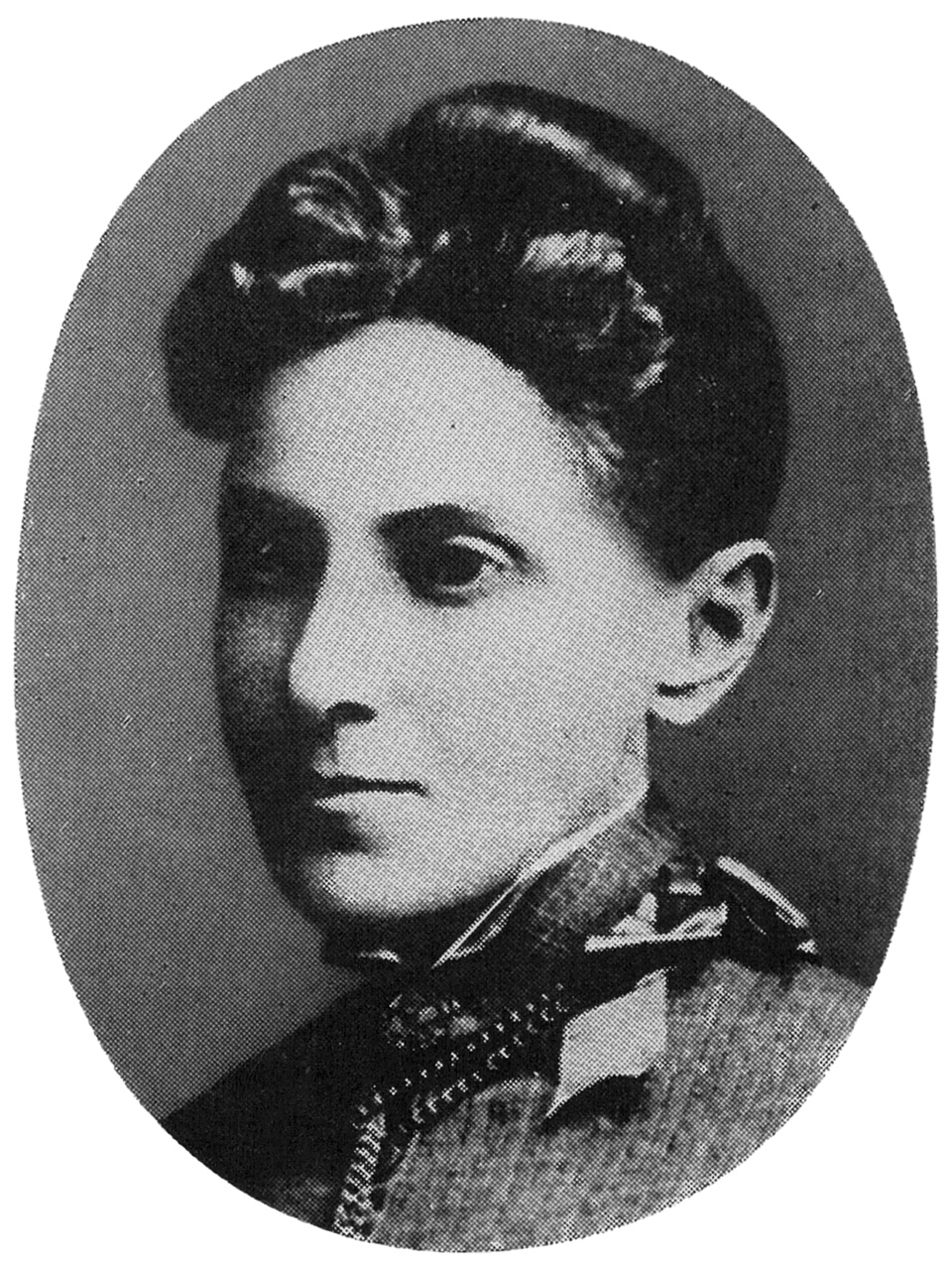
Dora E. Schoonmaker

== See also ==
- Lessie Bates Davis Neighborhood House
- Lucy Webb Hayes National Training School
- Protestant missions in China
- Women's missionary societies

== Sources ==
- Gracey, Mrs. J. T. (1888). Medical Work of the Woman's Foreign Missionary Society: Methodist Episcopal Church [with Supplement] (Public domain ed.). Woman's Foreign Missionary Society, Methodist Episcopal Church. ISBN 9780837012193.
- Methodist Episcopal Church. Woman's Foreign Missionary Society. Northwestern Branch (1889). Annual Report of the Northwestern Branch of the Woman's Foreign Missionary Society of the Methodist Episcopal Church (Public domain ed.). Northwestern Branch.
- Woman's Foreign Missionary Society of the Methodist Episcopal Church (1886). Annual Report (Public domain ed.). Charles A. Coffin. pp. 4–.
