= Cyrus David Foss =

American Methodist bishop

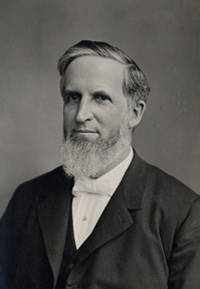

6th President of Wesleyan University
- In office 1875–1880
- Preceded by: Joseph Cummings
- Succeeded by: John Wesley Beach

Personal details
- Born: January 17, 1834 Kingston, New York
- Died: January 29, 1910 (aged 76) Philadelphia, Pennsylvania
- Spouses: Mary E. Bradley (m. 1856; died 1863) Amelia Robertson (m. 1865)
- Relations: Charles Franklin Robertson (brother-in-law)
- Education: Wesleyan University
- Profession: Educator

Cyrus David Foss (January 17, 1834 – January 29, 1910) was a prominent Methodist bishop in the latter 19th century, primarily serving in New York City and New England.

== Biography ==
Foss was born in Kingston, New York, on January 17, 1834. He attended Wesleyan University, graduating in 1854. He began his career teaching, and then entered the ministry. Foss was "pastor of the most prominent Methodist churches in this city [New York] and Brooklyn."

Foss married Mary E. Bradley in 1856. She died in 1863, and he married Amelia Robertson in 1865.

Foss was elected the sixth President of Wesleyan University in 1875, and he held that post for five years. His term in office was generally prosperous. By all accounts, Foss was a genial and avuncular man. Foss is widely credited for saving the school when it was in a time of financial ruin, following the Panic of 1873. To raise funds, he created a new program of disciplined Christian living for the students, and met with many prominent Methodist church leaders of New England. This Christian living program lasted until spring 1877. He lived on a hill behind the campus, and "Foss House" was a prominent campus fixture until the late 1950s. It was used to house veterans during and after World War II. It is now the site of West College. The hill is still known as "Foss Hill."

Bishop Foss is recognized as a man of superior abilities, an able preacher, and an earnest and devout Christian... He received the degree of D. D. from Wesleyan University in 1870 and that of LL.D. from Cornell College, Iowa, in 1879. He has contributed to current literature, and has published sermons and addresses, including "Songs in the Night," a Thanksgiving sermon, (New York, 1862), and his inaugural address as president of Wesleyan University (1876).

In 1880 Foss was consecrated a Methodist bishop. He served as a bishop in Minneapolis and Philadelphia. Later in life, Foss travelled the world extensively for the Methodist Church, and he published an account of his travels as From the Himalayas to the Equator: Letters, Sketches and Addresses, Giving Some Account of a Tour of India and Malaysia. After visiting missions in China he became ill, and did not recover his health.

Foss died in Philadelphia on January 29, 1910, and was buried in Pawling, New York. His papers are kept at Wesleyan and Drew Universities. A biography of Foss was published posthumously.

== See also ==
- List of bishops of the United Methodist Church
