= Zara A. Wilson =

American lawyer (born 1840)

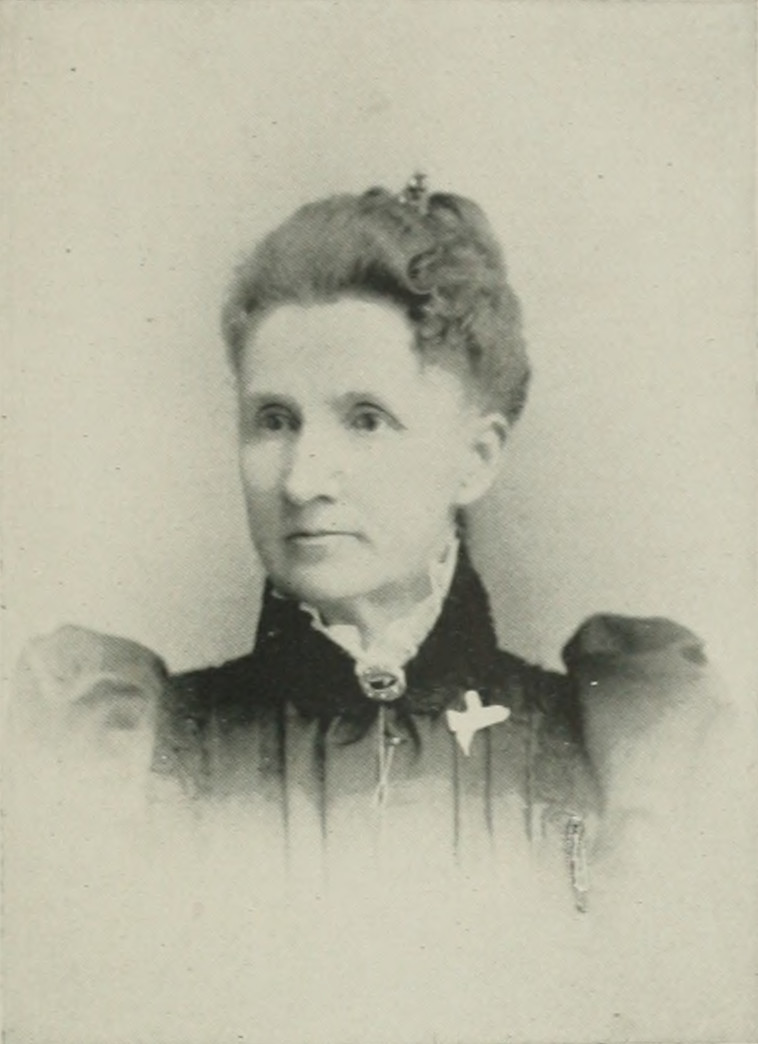
Zara A. Wilson, "A Woman of the Century"

Zara A. Wilson (born October 8, 1840) was an American reformer and lawyer.

== Early life and family ==
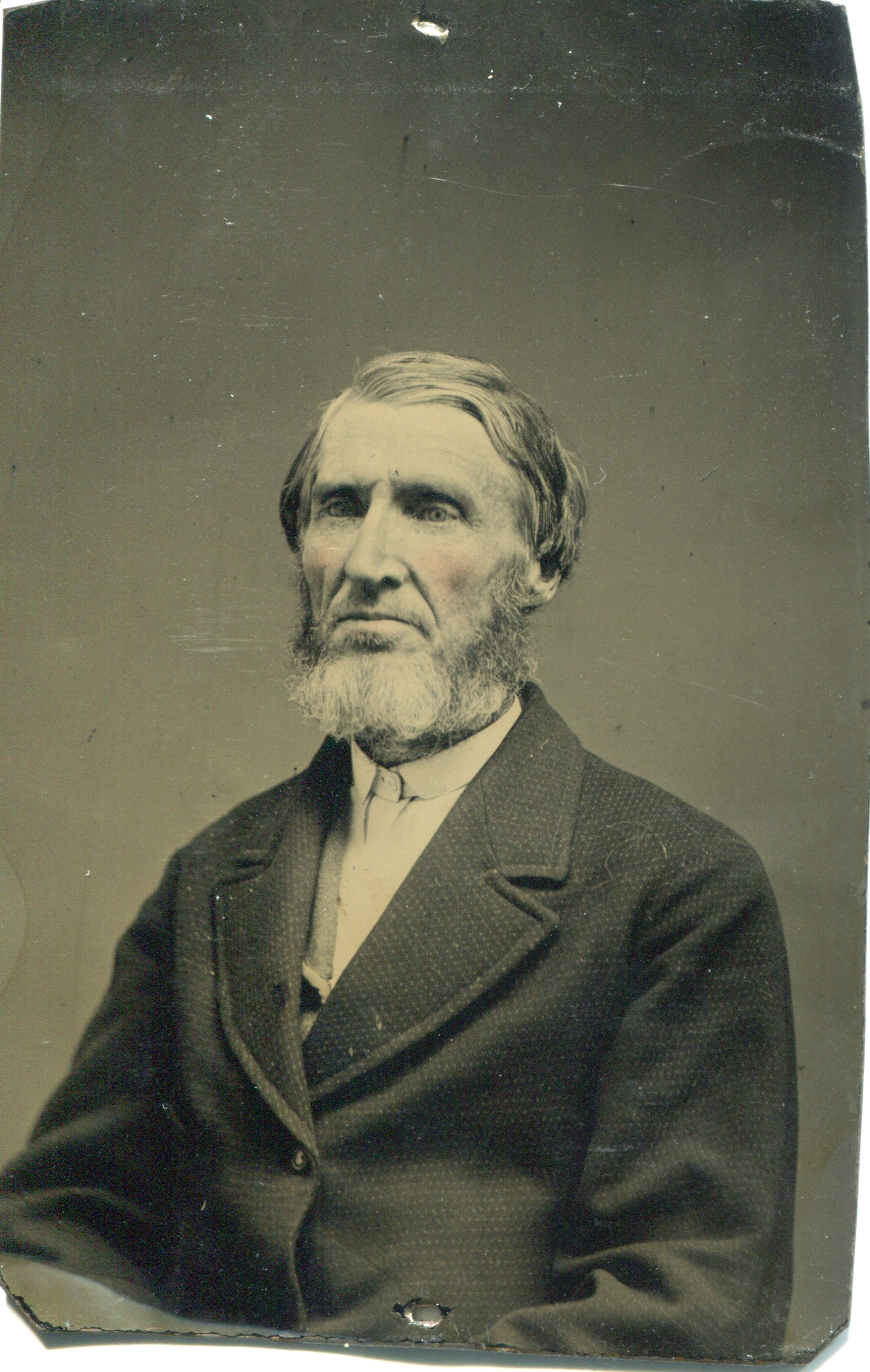
Isaac Mahurin

Zara Mahurin was born in Burnettsville, Indiana, on October 8, 1840. She was the fourth in a family of eight children. Her maiden name was Mahurin, to which form it had been Americanized from the Scotch Mac Huron. Her father, Caleb Mahurin (1786–1859), was of southern birth and education, a native of North Carolina. He was twice married, his second wife being Matilda C. Freeman (1809–1882), the mother of Wilson, to whom he was married near Troy, Ohio, in 1832.

Wilson's early life was spent on a farm, but she had the advantages of a seminary education in an institution founded and presided over by a half-brother, Isaac Mahurin (August 16, 1814 – August 23, 1870), in Fort Wayne, Indiana. Her sister, Mathilda L. Mahurin, was assistant principal. The Methodist College opened in 1852 and closed in 1863 when the Union Army claimed most of its students. The old brick building was on West Street and US 24.

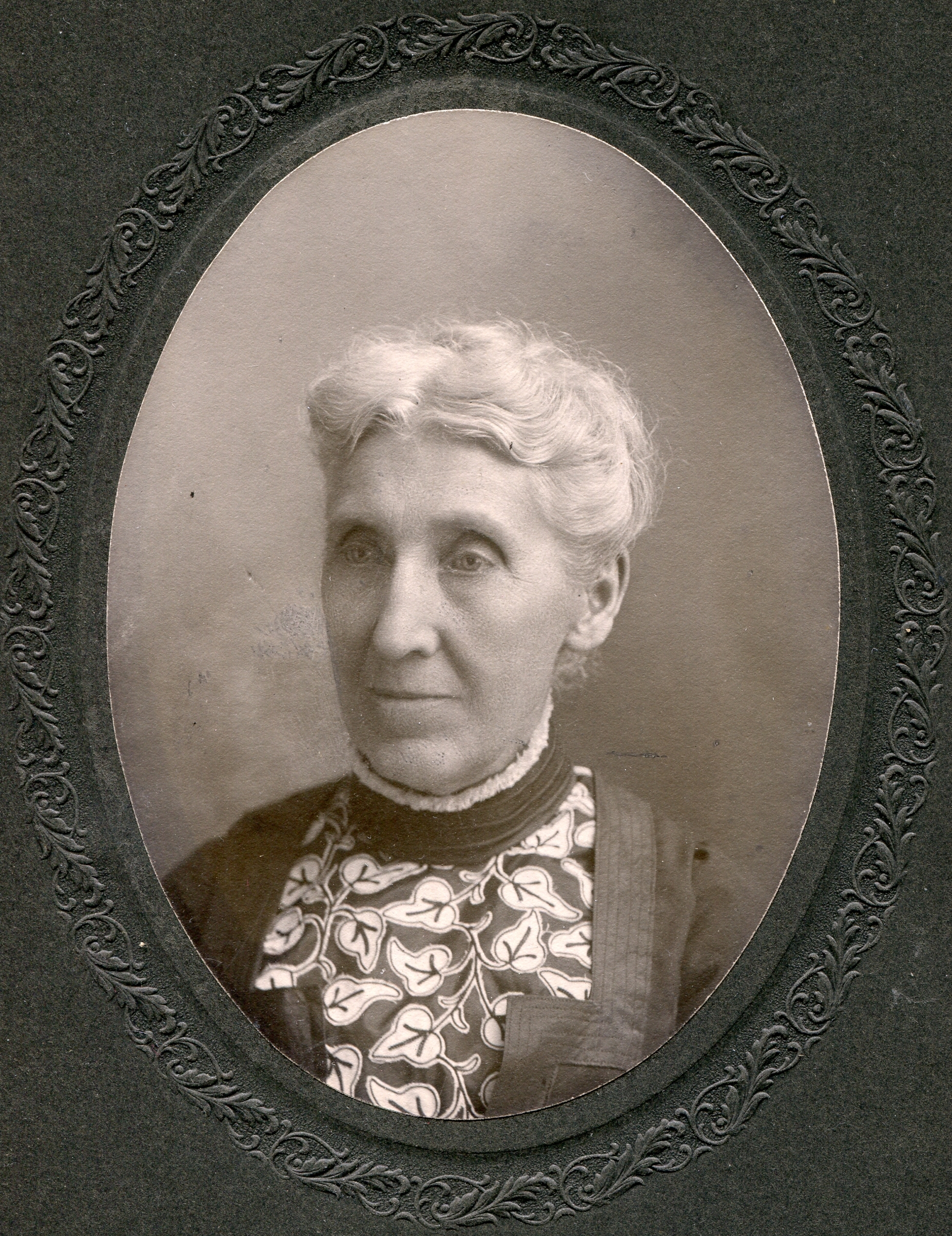
Matilda L. Mahurin

Mathilda L. Mahurin (November 11, 1827 – April 16, 1916) was for many years a resident of Indianapolis, and taught in the public school there for many years. She was born in Miami County, Ohio, on November 11, 1827, and moved to Indiana with her parents when she was a girl. She began teaching when a young woman, being for a time connected with the Methodist College at Fort Wayne. She moved to Indianapolis in 1867 and lived with her sister, Mary Kilbun Robinson (1821–1909), whose home was at 603 North New Jersey Street. Mathilda Mahurin was an active member of Meridian Street M.E. Church and died at Elkhart, Indiana.

Zara Mahurin had always shown a fondness for books, and during her student days she was fascinated by mathematics.

== Career ==
At the age of seventeen Zara Mahurin became a teacher. After one year in Fort Wayne College, she became assistant in that school. After the sudden death of her father, she returned home to support her grieving mother and helped her in settling the large estate. Eventually, she resumed teaching and served in Lafayette and other towns of Indiana.

In Lafayette, Indiana, Wilson took her first public stand in favor of gender equality, refusing to accept a position as principal because the salary offered was ten dollars per month less than was paid to a man for the same work. She had wished to enter the ministry but would not be admitted to the Biblical Institute in Evansville, Indiana because she was a woman.

Wilson organized the Woman's Foreign Missionary Society of the Methodist Episcopal Church in Goodland, Indiana, and was corresponding secretary of that district until, her health demanding change of climate, the family was moved to Lincoln, Nebraska, in 1870.. She was district corresponding secretary of the Woman's Foreign Missionary Society of the Methodist Episcopal Church in Nebraska.

Wilson was an efficient member of the Nebraska Woman's Christian Temperance Union, she delivered addresses and published state reports. She was elected three times for corresponding secretary of the Nebraska body but resigned because she felt overworked. She was a member of the national convention for four years and was State superintendent for the Woman's Christian Temperance Union. In the fall of 1892, she was a candidate on the prohibition ticket for county attorney.

Wilson was always active in the cause for women's advancement and an advocate of woman's political enfranchisement. Since her admission to the bar, in 1891, she made the legal status of women a specialty. She was the author of A Concise Compilation of Nebraska Laws, Of Special Interest to Women (1891).

In 1897 Wilson was nominated for Supreme Court justice by the Liberty Party, a Nebraska third-party organization.

== Personal life ==
In the year 1867, Zara Mahurin married Port Wilson, a merchant of Goodland, Indiana. As a result of poor health, for ten years,her energies confined mostly to home duties and the care of her only child, a son.
