= William Edwards Huntington =

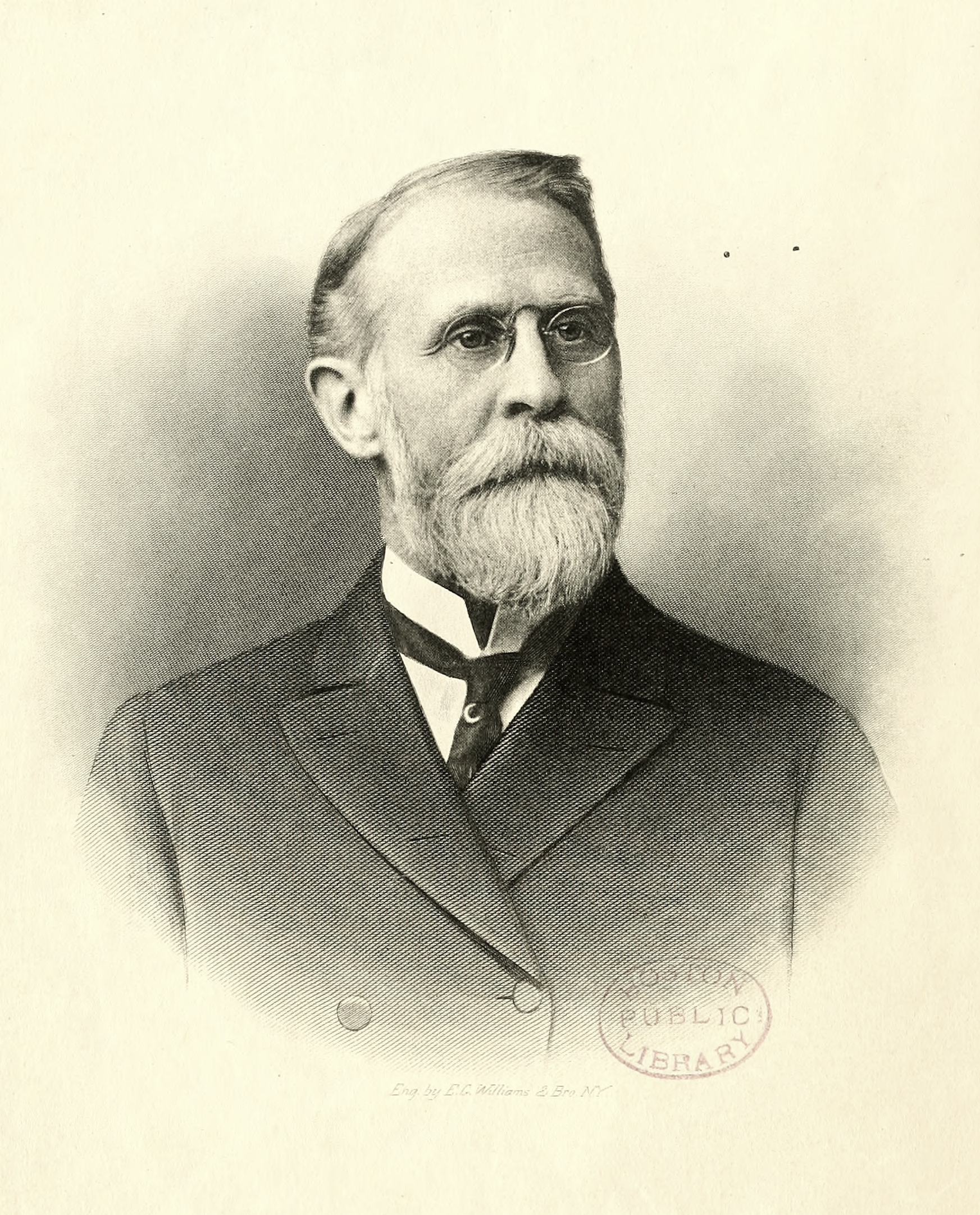
William E. Huntington

William Edwards Huntington (July 30, 1844 – December 6, 1930) was an American university dean and president.

== Early life ==
Huntington was born in Hillsboro, Illinois on July 30, 1844, to William Pitkin and Lucy (Edwards) Huntington. He was the nephew of Frederic Dan Huntington and brother of Ellery Huntington Sr. He served as private and first lieutenant in the Wisconsin Infantry from 1864 to 1865.

== Ministry ==
He was ordained as a minister in 1868 and was the pastor of a Methodist Episcopal Church in Madison, Wisconsin. He received his Bachelor of Arts degree from the University of Wisconsin–Madison in 1870 and moved to Massachusetts. to continue his education at Boston University (B.D., 1873; Ph.D., 1881). In 1871, he was admitted to the New England Methodist Episcopal Conference as a deacon and preached at the M.E. church in Nahant, Massachusetts. The following year, he was promoted to elder and was placed in charge of churches in Roslindale and Jamaica Plain. He then held pastorates at Roslindale (1872–1874), Newton (1875–1876), Cambridge (1877–1879), and the Tremont Street Methodist Episcopal Church in Boston (1880–1882).

== Boston University ==
At Boston University, Huntington was dean of the College of Liberal Arts from 1884 to 1904, president of the university from 1904 to 1911, and dean of the graduate department from 1911 to 1917.

== Personal life and death ==
On May 10, 1881, he married Ella M. Speare of Newton Center, Massachusetts. They had one son and two daughters.

Huntington died from pneumonia on December 6, 1930 at his home in Newton Center.
