= Liang May Seen =

First woman of Chinese descent to live in Minnesota

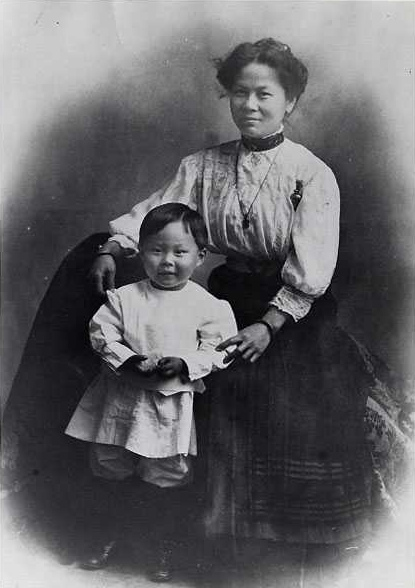
Liang with her son Howard, c. 1910

Liang May Seen (c. 1871 – 1946) was the first woman of Chinese descent to live in Minnesota. She overcame an impoverished childhood in China and teenage years spent in a San Francisco brothel to become a respected leader in the Chinese immigrant community in Minneapolis.

== Early life and emigration ==
Liang May Seen was born in southern China's Guangdong Province around 1871. In 1885, at the age of fourteen, her parents sold her to a man who promised that Liang would be marrying a wealthy Chinese American merchant. Instead he sold her to a brothel in San Francisco. At the brothel, Liang May Seen was forced to provide sexual services for businessmen, but she plotted her escape. She contacted the Presbyterian Mission Home for assistance. On July 21, 1889, she slipped away from a banquet and was picked up in a carriage sent by the Mission Home.

Liang lived at the Mission Home for three years. Besides converting to Christianity and learning housekeeping skills, she took classes in English, Cantonese, and mathematics. In 1892, a Chinese businessman from Minneapolis, Woo Yee Sing, visited the mission looking for a wife. There he found Liang; they were married that summer and she moved with him to Minneapolis.

== Life in Minnesota ==
Woo Yee Sing had immigrated to the United States at the age of eighteen, moving to San Francisco in the early 1880s. He arrived to face severe anti-Chinese violence. The 1882 Chinese Exclusion Act - which restricted Chinese immigration to the United States - had also bolstered the segregation and social exclusion of Chinese immigrants already in the United States.

Most of the Chinese men who came to the Midwest during the 1880s and 1890s moved from the West Coast to escape this kind of violence. Woo Yee Sing moved for the same reason. Minnesota was not free from violence or discrimination, however. In 1912 a small bomb was set off near Woo's restaurant, and his son recalled being taunted and called racist names. Like many Chinese men at this time, Woo became a laundry operator. In 1883, Woo Yee Sing and his brother Woo Du Sing opened a restaurant. Canton Cafe, later known as John's Place, was the first Chinese restaurant in Minneapolis.

When Liang joined Woo in Minneapolis, she was the first Chinese woman to live in Minnesota. She made friends quickly, however. Because of her time at the Mission Home, she was fluent in English and had experience with cross-cultural friendships. Many of the white women she befriended in Minneapolis were neighbors and patrons of the curio shop she opened in 1904. Others, such as suffragist Mabeth Hurd Paige, were friends through organizations like the Woman's Foreign Missionary Society of the Methodist Episcopal Church.

Liang May Seen and Woo Yee Sing were both very involved with the Westminster Presbyterian Church. The church and its Chinese Sunday School were important institutions for many Chinese immigrants in Minneapolis. Westminster began teaching English lessons to Chinese men in 1882, and Woo Yee Sing was one of their first students. Although Westminster did not begin teaching English to Chinese women until 1920, the church was one of few places where women - both white and Chinese - could take on leadership roles through their involvement with social and religious activities. Most other civic organizations did not accept Chinese Americans until the 1930s or 1940s.

The Chinese community in Minneapolis began growing after 1900. As Minnesota's Chinese men achieved economic success, more of them were able to bring their wives and families from Guangdong Province. When Chinese women moved to Minneapolis, Liang was there to help them acclimate to their new country.

One of these women, Minnie Wong, became lifelong friends with Liang. Wong's husband, Wong Gee, brought her to Minneapolis in the early 1900s. Liang May Seen and Minnie Wong were both from Kaiping, and they spoke the same dialect. They visited each other frequently, and together they taught Westminster's first English classes for women.

In 1906, Liang May Seen and her husband expanded their family. They were never able to have biological children, but they adopted a young boy named Howard from San Francisco. Liang was also very close to her niece, Margaret Woo Chinn.

Liang died in 1946. She lived long enough to see the 1943 end of immigration laws excluding the Chinese.
