= Emily M. J. Cooley =

American religious and temperance worker (1831–1917)

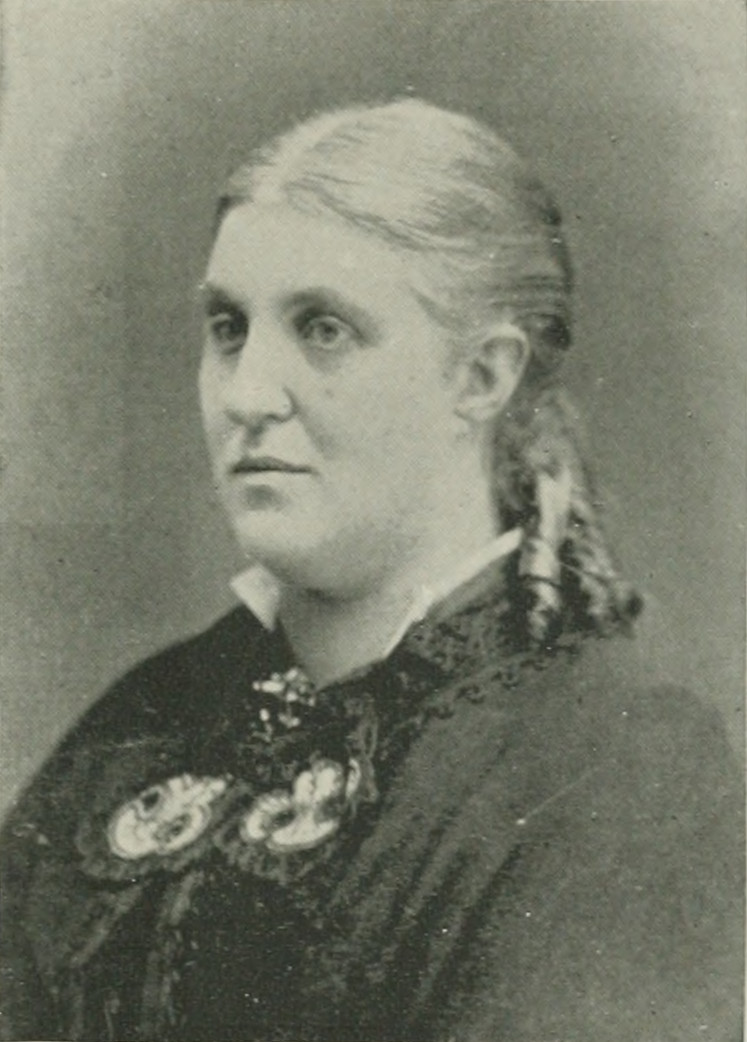
- Portrait from A Woman of the Century
- Born: Emily Maria Jones; November 1, 1831; Lima, New York, U.S.
- Died: November 26, 1917 (aged 86); Blair, Nebraska, U.S.
- Education: Aurora Academy (later Wells College
- Occupations: religious and temperance leader
- Organizations: Woman's Christian Temperance Union; Woman's Foreign Missionary Society of the Methodist Episcopal Church
- Spouse: Rufus Cooley (m. 1851; died 1894)

Emily M. J. Cooley (née Jones; 1831–1917) was an American religious and temperance leader affiliated with the Woman's Christian Temperance Union (W.C.T.U.) and the Woman's Foreign Missionary Society of the Methodist Episcopal Church.

== Early life and education ==
Emily Maria Jones was born in Lima, New York, November 1, 1831. Her parents were Henry W. Jones (1798–1854) and Mary Alma (Mott) Jones (1813–1870). Her maternal ancestry was of the French nobility who came to New Jersey and found a place where they could practice their religion peacefully. Many of the descendants became distinguished soldiers during the American Revolutionary War. On her father's side, she was descended from the Puritans of 1636. They settled in North Adams, Massachusetts. Emily's siblings included Harriet, Porter, Amanda, William, Benjamin, John, Sarah, Porter, Helen, Marion, and Mary.

Till the age of 16, she attended the public schools, and then was a student for a year each in Buffalo, New York, in Rochester, New York, and at Aurora Academy, later Wells College, in Aurora, New York.

== Career ==
She was for five years a teacher in Buffalo.

In 1851, she married Rev. Rufus Cooley Jr. (1826–1894), of the Methodist Episcopal Church, a graduate in Meadville, Pennsylvania. The couple had two children: Alice and Henry.

For one year, she served as preceptor of Cooperstown Seminary in Cooperstown, New York.

They moved to Wisconsin in 1862, and she began her public work in the Woman's Foreign Missionary Society. She was for several years vice-president of the society in Wisconsin Conference of the M. E. Church and organized many auxiliaries.

Her temperance work was begun in 1869, continuing for the cause of prohibition even in her later years.

In 1880, her husband was transferred to the Nebraska Conference of the M. E. Church. She had resolved to get some rest after the move, but her fame preceded her in letters to the State officers from Frances Willard and others. She was made State organizer for the W.C.T.U. of Nebraska, in her first year with that body. She served four years as State and three years as National W.C.T.U. organizer, speaking in every State of the Union. For several years, she also served as president of the second district W.C.T.U. of Nebraska.

Though not an ordained minister of the M. E. Church, being a woman, she was known as an exhorter, and she was twice appointed by the presiding elder to supply the pulpit of a church without a pastor. Each time, she performed well and the membership increased in size.

Emily M. J. Cooley died at Blair, Nebraska, November 26, 1917. Interment was at Wyuka Cemetery.
