= Cora E. Simpson =

American nurse and nursing educator

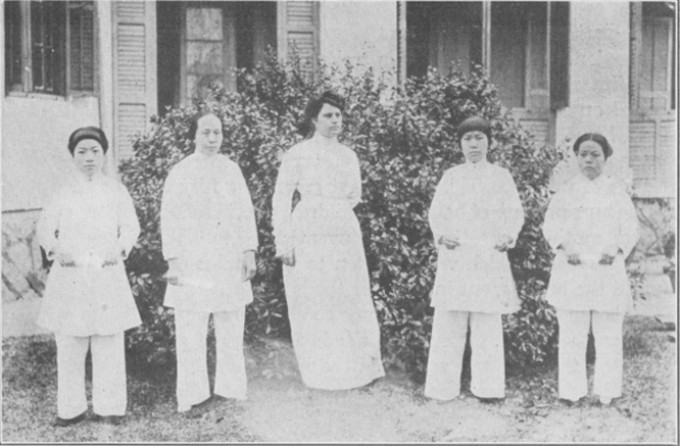
- Cora E. Simpson (center), with four Chinese women graduates of the Florence Nightingale Training School in Fuzhou, from a 1913 publication.
- Born: Cora Eliza Simpson; February 13, 1880; Oberlin, Kansas, US
- Died: May 14, 1960 (aged 80); Chelsea, Michigan, US
- Occupations: nurse, nursing educator, medical missionary
- Notable work: A Joy Ride Through China for the N. A. C. (1926)

Cora Eliza Simpson (February 13, 1880 – May 14, 1960) was an American nurse and nursing educator. She was a missionary in China from 1907 to 1945, and founded and ran the Florence Nightingale School of Nursing in Fuzhou. She was also a founder of the Nurses' Association of China.

== Early life ==
Cora Simpson was born near Oberlin, Kansas, the daughter of George Mathew Simpson and Rhoda Rosina Simpson. She trained as a nurse at the Nebraska Deaconess Hospital in Omaha, with further training in Chicago, and courses in public health nursing at Simmons College in Boston.

Her youngest sister, Mabel Ellen Simpson, followed her into nursing and missionary work in Asia. Mabel Simpson spent thirteen years as a Methodist nurse in India before she married in 1939.

== Career ==
Simpson joined the Woman's Foreign Missionary Society of the Methodist Episcopal Church, and was a missionary in China from 1907 until 1944. She founded and ran the Florence Nightingale School of Nursing in Fuzhou. and was superintendent at the Magaw Memorial Hospital and Nurses' Home. "When I came to China I was told that China did not need and was not ready for nurses," she wrote in 1913. "After a day in the hospital and a few visits out into the homes, I decided there were few things that China did need as much as nurses." In 1911, 1917-1918 and 1926-1927, she spent time on furlough, speaking about her work at churches and to other community groups.

Simpson was a co-founder and, later, general secretary of the Nurses' Association of China (N. A. C.). She represented the association at international nursing conferences in Finland in 1925 and in France in 1933. She wrote about her early experiences in China in a memoir, A Joy Ride Through China for the N. A. C. (1926). In 1947, she was named N. A. C.'s general secretary emeritus, in honor of her lifetime of service.

== Personal life ==
Simpson returned to the United States in 1945, and settled in Michigan. She lectured about her time in China in her later years, and died in 1960, in Chelsea, Michigan, aged 80 years. She is remembered by nursing historians as "a key contributor to modern nursing in China".
