= Tremont Street Methodist Episcopal Church =

Church in Massachusetts, United States of America

Coordinates: 42°20′24.53″N 71°4′43.51″W

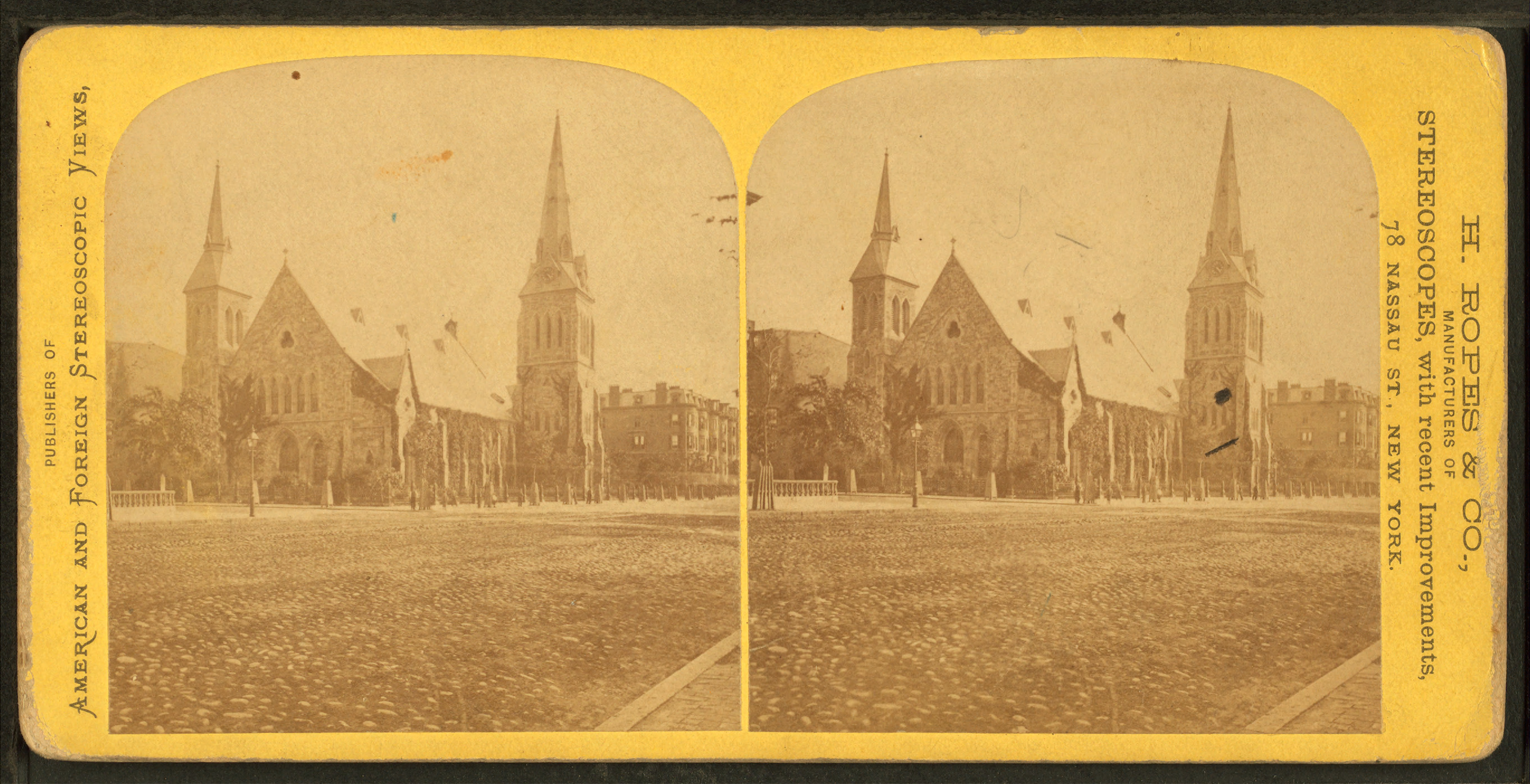
An early illustration of Tremont Street Methodist Episcopal Church in Boston, following its late 19th century founding

The Tremont Street Methodist Episcopal Church, located at 740 Tremont Street in Boston, Massachusetts, was built in 1862 from a design by architect Hammatt Billings. In the late 1960s it became the New Hope Baptist Church.

== History ==
Prior to 1862, the Methodist Episcopal congregation had occupied the Hedding Church on Pelham Street in Boston for some 20 years. The congregation's new church building, located at 740 Tremont Street, "is a large, Gothic, natural-quarry stone building, with two spires, respectively 150 feet and 100 feet high."

In 1869, several members of the Tremont Street Church congregation established the Woman's Foreign Missionary Society of the Methodist Episcopal Church. The group of eight founders consisted of Mrs. Lewis Flanders; Mrs. Thomas Kingsbury; Mrs. William B. Merrill; Lois Lee Parker; Mrs. Thomas A. Rich; Mrs. H.J. Stoddard; and Mrs. P.T. Taylor.

The society grew quickly across the country, and by 1876 included "eight associated branches" in New England; New York and New Jersey; Pennsylvania and Delaware; Maryland, District of Columbia, and Eastern Virginia; Ohio, Western Virginia and Kentucky; Illinois, Indiana, Michigan, and Wisconsin; Iowa, Missouri, Kansas, Minnesota, Nebraska and Colorado; and Tennessee, North Carolina, South Carolina, Alabama, Georgia, and Florida. By 1909, it was "the largest woman's foreign missionary society in the world."

Pastors of Tremont Church included John E. Cookman (c. 1874); William Edwards Huntington (1880–1882); C.E. Davis (c. 1901); Charles K. Jenness (c. 1914); and others.

The building changed owners in the 1960s, and the last congregation to worship there was the New Hope Baptist Church. The building was sold to a developer in 2011 and has since been converted to private housing.

== History of the Windows ==
In 1940, after the church was renovated, a large number of stained glass windows were installed throughout the church, many of which honored the early founders, leaders, and missionaries of the WFMS.

There were 11 windows placed in the sanctuary, each one of which was purchased by one of the then existing branches of the WFMS: New England, New York, Philadelphia, Baltimore, Cincinnati, Northwestern, Des Moines, Minneapolis, Topeka, Pacific, and Columbia River. In addition, there were two windows dedicated to the New England Deaconess Association, and a number of windows dedicated to former pastors and early members and leaders of the Tremont Street MEC.

There were also windows dedicated to former pastors, some of whom originated from other parts of the country than New England: Dr. Henry White Warren (later elected Bishop); Dr. William E. Huntington (later second President of Boston University), Dr. William Nast Brodbeck, Dr. henry L. Wriston, Dr. Leopold a. Nies, Dr. John D. Pickles, and Rev. Azariah Reimer.
