= Cornelia Moore Chillson Moots =

American missionary and temperance evangelist (1843–1929)

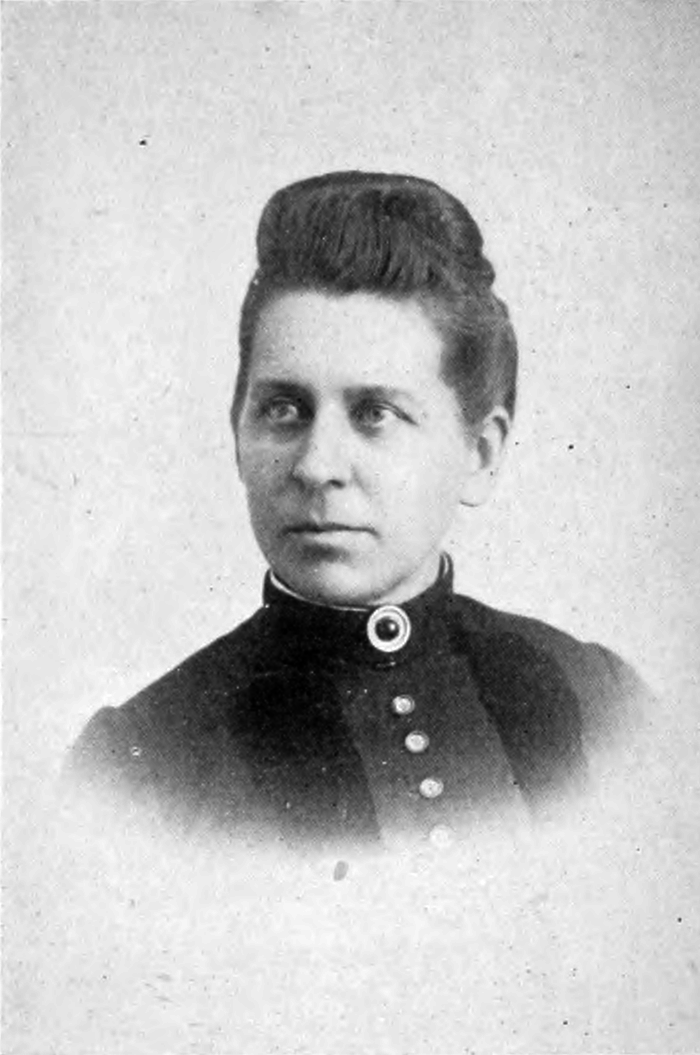
Cornelia Moore Chillson Moots, "A Woman of the Century"

Cornelia Moore Chillson Moots (nickname, “Mother Moots”; October 14, 1843 – 1929) was an American missionary and temperance evangelist. She was one of four pioneer missionaries of the Woman's Foreign Missionary Society of the Methodist Episcopal Church.

Moots knew the state of Michigan in its pioneer days, her parents taking her there in 1836. After years of activity in exhorting and organizing new branches, a new field opened to her as a temperance worker and she turned her force into the broad channel of temperance reform. She served many terms as state evangelist in the Woman's Christian Temperance Union.

== Early years ==
Cornelia Moore Chillson was born in Flushing, Michigan, October 14, 1843. Her parents were of New England lineage. Her father, Calvin C. C. Chillson, was a temperance advocate and was said to be a descendant of the Whites, who came over in the Mayflower. Her mother was a typical Green Mountain girl, a granddaughter of James Wilcox, a minute man of the American Revolution, and the second man to enter Fort Ticonderoga at the time of its capture by Ethan Allen. Moots' parents moved to Michigan in 1836. Abigail Chillson, the grandmother, then a widow, went with them. The new settlements were without preachers, and her grandmother Chillson, an ardent Methodist, often supplied the itinerary by preaching in the log schoolhouses and cabins of the early pioneers. Moots' father was a staunch anti-slavery man, a member of the Underground Railroad, and the Chillson home was often the refuge of the slave seeking liberty across the line. May 3, 1864. Her mother had a local reputation for deeds of charity and her care of homeless children. Self-reliant, persevering, fond of books and of a highly religious temperament, those prominent characteristics in early life forecast something of Moots' future.

She began to teach school at the age of fifteen and continued in that employment until she entered Albion College, in the fall of 1865. Her college career was cut short in the junior exhibition of her class, in the close of the winter term of 1869. She thought the president of the college overstepped his jurisdiction in criticising and dictating the style of dress she was to wear on that occasion. She left her seat on the platform, and, accompanied by one of the professors, left the hall, never to return as a student, although later, in 1882, the college awarded her a full diploma with the degree of A. B.

== Career ==
Moots returned home and was immediately employed as a teacher in the Bay City, Michigan high school, where she remained until she married William Moots, a merchant of West Bay City, Michigan, in 1870. Household cares and the education of her young daughter, with occasional demands upon her to fill vacant pulpits, by the clergy of her own and other denominations, absorbed her time, until the death of Mr. Moots in 1880. As a Bible student, she had always desired to visit historic lauds, and that desire was granted in 1881. A trip through the principal countries of the continent was followed by a tour through the Holy Land and Egypt. The entire journey through Palestine was made on horseback. Always active in church, a new field opened to her as a temperance worker, and she turned her forces into the broad channel of temperance reform. For the 1913–14 term, she served as 2nd vice-president of the Detroit Conference of the Woman's Foreign Missionary Society. Northwestern Branch.

She served three terms as State evangelist in the Woman's Christian Temperance Union. She was radical in her views on temperance, admission of women to the Methodist Episcopal General Conference and equal suffrage. She believed in the same standard of morals for men and women. Before an audience, she was an easy speaker, and was both persuasive and argumentative. Moots died in 1929.
