= Clotilda Lyon McDowell =

American missionary

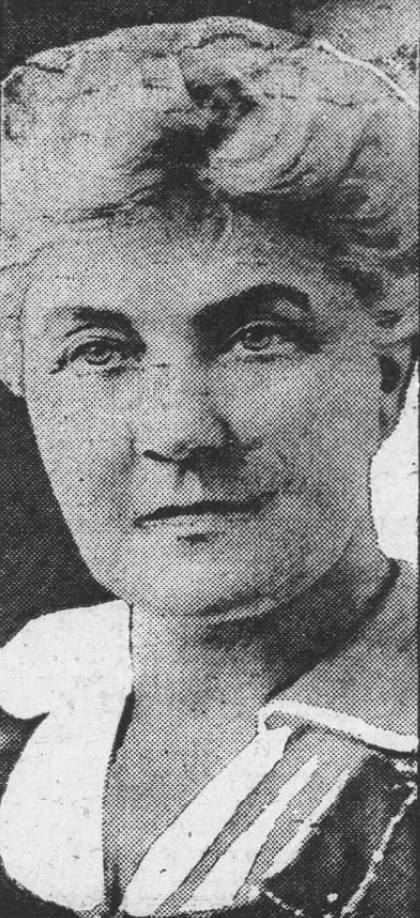
- McDowell, from a 1919 publication
- Born: Clotilda Lyon; March 14, 1858; Galion, Ohio, U.S.
- Died: December 27, 1930 (aged 72); Washington, D.C., U.S.
- Occupation: Church worker
- Known for: President of the Woman's Foreign Missionary Society
- Spouse: William Fraser McDowell

Clotilda Lyon McDowell (March 14, 1858 – December 27, 1930) was an American Methodist leader. She was president of the Woman's Foreign Missionary Society of the Methodist Episcopal Church (WFMS) from 1909 to 1921.

== Early life and education ==
Lyon was born in Galion, Ohio, the daughter of Aaron Jackson Lyon and Olive A. Weatherby Lyon. Her father was a Methodist Episcopal pastor. She graduated from Ohio Wesleyan University in 1880. She received an honorary master's degree from Ohio Wesleyan in 1911.

== Career ==
McDowell taught school after college and before she married. She was a charter member of the Women's Club of Denver, while her husband was a college chancellor there. She was president of the Woman's Foreign Missionary Society of the Methodist Episcopal Church beginning in 1909. In 1910 and 1911 she visited church missions in the Philippines, Japan, Korea, China, India and Europe, and was a delegate to the 1910 World Missionary Conference. She wrote and edited church publications.

McDowell retired as president of the WFMS in 1921, but remained active in the society's work. The WFMS set up a fellowship fun named for her, after her retirement; it funded hundreds of women mission school graduates to attend colleges or receive other advanced training in the United States.

== Publications ==
- "Forward from the Jubilee" (1919)
- "Good Hopes and Precious Memories"

== Personal life and legacy ==
Lyon married Methodist Episcopal clergyman William Fraser McDowell in 1882. Their daughter Olive died in 1907, while she was a college student. McDowell died in 1930, at the age of 72, at her home in Washington, D.C. Frederick Brown Harris conducted her funeral service in Washington. In 1939, a chapel was built at Isabella Thoburn College in Lucknow, and named in memory Clotilda Lyon McDowell.
