= Anna Fisher Beiler =

American missionary, newspaper editor

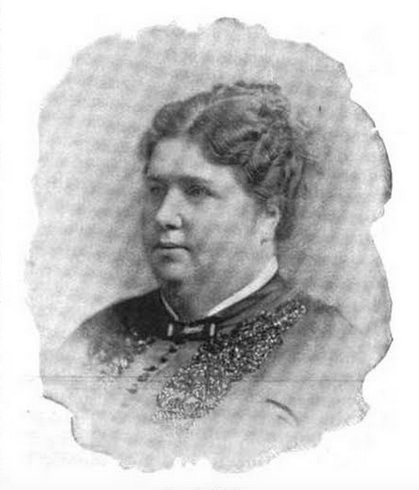
- Born: Anna Fisher; February 25, 1848; Newcastle upon Tyne, England, U.K.
- Died: April 1, 1904 (aged 56); Buffalo, New York, U.S.
- Resting place: Green-Wood Cemetery, Brooklyn, New York, U.S.
- Occupations: missionary; newspaper editor
- Spouse: Samuel Lynch Beiler (m. 1875)
- Writing career
- Language: English

Anna Fisher Beiler (February 25, 1848 – April 1, 1904) was a British-born American Christian missionary and newspaper editor, who engaged in temperance, missionary, and philanthropic work. Associated with the Methodist Episcopal Church, she served as Secretary of the Bureau for District of Alaska. She thoroughly identified herself with this work, and visited the region in 1897, that she might do better at directing it. She made an extended tour in the service of that region in the interests of the Woman's Foreign Missionary Society of the Methodist Episcopal Church, and supervised the erection of the building in Unalaska. Beiler was a prominent officer of the Woman's Home Missionary Society for many years and influential in the shaping of its policy and work. She lectured on Alaska in many states, increasing the public interest.

== Early life and education ==
Anna Fisher was born February 25, 1848, in Newcastle upon Tyne, England. She was the only daughter of John and Ann Comble Fisher. Her parents came to the United States when she was nine months old, and settled in Middleport, Ohio. Her father was there an official member of the church for fifty years, and her mother for many years was chorister, class leader, steward, and Sunday school superintendent, teaching 1,040 lessons without a break.

Here, Beiler was converted during her girlhood, and joined the church under the pastorate of Dr. Gardner. After graduating from high school she taught two years, then entered Ohio Wesleyan University. The records of her scholarship and Christian influence In the university were excellent. She served as president of her class, and of the literary society, and was one of the speakers on commencement day. During her senior year she was very active in the canvass which closed all the saloons in the town. At the university, she met Samuel Lynch Beiler, and they became engaged shortly before her graduation in 1872.

== Career ==
After graduation, the engaged couple offered themselves for foreign mission work, expecting to go to China, but the American Methodist Episcopal Mission was not able to send them at that time. She then became a teacher under the Freedmen's Aid Society and Southern Education Society, and taught one year in New Orleans University. The yellow fever preventing her return the following year she was sent to Huntsville, Alabama, as principal of the seminary there.

On June 8, 1875, she married Dr. Samuel Lynch Beiler (1847–1917). and they went to Boston, where her husband was a student in the university and pastor of a church in Quincy, Massachusetts. Here, she mastered all the studies in science and philosophy which her husband was taking. During the next year, the Red Ribbon Reform Movement, under Dr. Henry A. Reynolds, was brought to Quincy by her husband, and a Reform Club of 1,400 men was organized. In connection with this, a Woman's Temperance Union of 500 women was organized, and Mrs. Beiler was made the president. During the year, she made many addresses throughout Massachusetts, and was vice president of the Union of Massachusetts, with Mary Livermore as president.

In 1877, Dr. Beiler joined the Central Ohio Conference. Here, she took the full course of Conference studies and attended all the examinations. She was very active in church work, especially in revival services and in connection with the Woman's Missionary Society in which she became district and Conference officer.

At the General Conference held in Cincinnati in 1880, Dr. and Mrs. Beiler offered themselves for Alaska to open up a new Mission, and her disappointment was great when they learned that the society was not prepared to begin the work. After seven years of work in Ohio, a transfer came to New York East Conference, and two years were spent in Hartford, Connecticut, and five in Brooklyn, New York. During these years, besides her activity in the churches, making pastoral calls with her husband, speaking for and organizing missionary societies, she became interested In the Methodist Home for the Aged that was being organized and built in Brooklyn. For two years, she edited and published a paper in connection with fairs held for the Home, from which she realized US$1,500 each year. She also edited a paper in the interest of the Brooklyn Hospital. Later, she did the same for the Methodist Hospital.

At the close of the Brooklyn pastorate she went abroad with her husband, and ten months were spent in Ireland, England, and elsewhere in Europe, spending six weeks in each of the cities of London, Paris, Rome, and Berlin, studying in museums, art galleries, and universities. On their return to the U.S., one year was spent in Sands Street Church, Brooklyn, during which time she became officially identified with the Woman's Home Missionary Society, and was put on the committee in charge of the work in Alaska. When her husband became identified with the American University their residence was at Washington, D.C. and she had opportunities to study Alaska in the government departments, which resulted in her creating and becoming the first secretary of the Bureau for Alaska in the Woman's Home Missionary Society. (Note: According to the Woman's Home Missionary Society (1904), in 1894, Beiler became the successor of Mrs. Teller as Secretary of the Alaskan Bureau, which office she held at the time of her death.) Beiler served in the role for ten years.

When it was found necessary for someone to go and superintend the building at Unalaska and visit other parts of the Territory. Beiler undertook the work in 1897. She visited southeastern Alaska, then sailed west along the coast, stopping at all possible points, getting the building under way at Unalaska, and then went to the Bering Sea, visiting Saint Michael's and coasting Cape Nome. From there, she went up the Yukon River to the Klondike, at the time the miners were coming out with the first gold of the Klondike Gold Rush. After seven months' unceasing travel, she returned home to Washington, D.C. suffering with the Klondike, or mining camp fever, for four months. During her tedious and long illness, her chief anxiety was that her husband should not be embarrassed in his work and that her daughters should not he hindered in their college studies.

In 1898, after recovering, she visited a number of spring Conferences in the East and spoke to crowds that filled the churches. In the fall, she went West, speaking in Ohio, Indiana, Illinois, and as far Northwest as Minneapolis and Saint Paul, Minnesota. For two years, she kept up this overtaxing work until she was suddenly stricken at Defiance, Ohio with what seemed a partial paralysis, rendering her speechless for a day or two.

== Later life and death ==
From the fall of 1899, she was compelled to restrain her activities, and the people of Buffalo, where her husband was pastor, had little chance to know of her abilities in organizing and managing work related to Church activities. Her invalidism was such that she was compelled to do her work largely through her writing. However, she was still able to superintended the construction of a hospital at Unalaska.

She died on April 1, 1904, in Buffalo. Her funeral was held on Easter day in Richmond Avenue Church, Buffalo, of which Dr. Beiler was pastor. Interment was made In the family lot in Green-Wood Cemetery, Brooklyn, where some years earlier, an older daughter had been buried. She was survived by her husband and daughters.
