= Bélier =

Bélier is the French word for a ram. It may also refer to:

- Bélier (rocket)
- Bélier Region, Ivory Coast
- La Famille Bélier 2014 French comedy-drama film directed by Éric Lartigau
- Groupe Bélier, patriotes jurassiens (UPJ). A youth group of militant separatists known as the Béliers formed in 1963 in Switzerland
- Bélier, French medieval battering ram
- Sandrine Bélier (1973–) French Green politician
- French destroyer Bélier
