= Clara Swain =

American physician and missionary (1834–1910)

Dr. Clara Swain
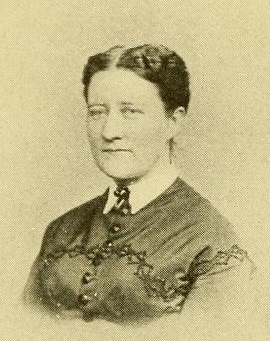
- Swain in 1869
- Born: 18 July 1834; Elmira, New York
- Died: December 25, 1910 (aged 76); Castile, New York
- Education: Woman's Medical College of Pennsylvania
- Occupations: Physician and Christian missionary

Clara A. Swain (18 July 1834 – 25 December 1910) was an American physician and Christian missionary of the Methodist Episcopal Church. She has been called the "pioneer woman physician in India," and as well as the "first fully accredited woman physician ever sent out by any missionary society into any part of the Non-Christian world". Her call to service in India fell from a need to have a female physician provide quality medical care to high-caste women, that were religiously secluded to zenana. Supported by the Woman's Foreign Missionary Society of the Methodist Episcopal Church, Swain left the United States in 1869, for Bareilly, India, where she spent the next twenty-seven years of her life treating women and children from illnesses, while simultaneously working to evangelize natives.

By the end of her first year in Bareilly, Swain had acquired seventeen medical students, clinically trained under her supervision, and had treated at minimum, 1,300 patients. Within the next four years, she helped establish the first hospital in India for women and children.

== Early life and education ==
Swain was born in Elmira, New York and raised in Castile, New York. Her father, John Swain, was of Irish descent and her mother, Clarisa Seavey, carried New England ancestry. At age eight, Swain joined the Methodist Church, a decision that would influence her aspirations of assuming a "Christian profession". Following her religious studies, at age twenty-one, Swain began teaching private pupils in Castile and subsequently moved to Canandaigua, New York to formally teach at a school. There, she developed an interest in medicine by caring for the sick. Swain began her medical training at the Castile Sanatorium, under the direction of Dr. Cordelia A. Greene. Three years later, she applied and was accepted to the Woman's Medical College of Pennsylvania, graduating in the spring of 1869.

== Working in Bareilly ==
Mrs. Thomas, the director of the girls' orphanage of the Methodist Mission in Bairelly, India, sent out a letter to Mrs. J.T. Gracey (a former missionary), requesting for a female physician to aid the village. Mrs. J.T. Gracey in turn, sent for Dr. Swain. Swain accepted the appeal and on November 3, 1869, she sailed from New York and arrived in Bareilly on January 20, 1870.

=== Medical training for native women ===
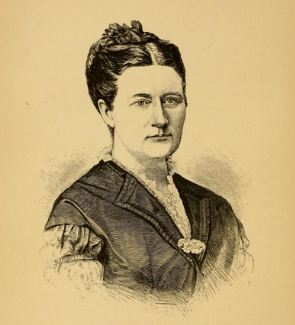
Swain in c. 1881

Upon arriving in Bareilly, India, Swain made it an imperative to train local women to help assist her with patients. Swain began with the fourteen native Christian women that Mrs. Thomas had previously been educating. Beginning March 1, 1870, these women were given clinical experience by working with the orphaned sick and "Christian village", and were taught basic lessons in "anatomy, physiology, and materia medica," by Swain herself. They soon became "proficient in compounding and dispensing machines." Swain had spent two to three hours a day with her students, preparing them for the "examination of fourth-grade doctors," supervised under two civil surgeons and an American physician. Thirteen of her students passed the exam, and on April 10, 1873, they were bestowed "certificates for practice in all ordinary diseases." Of these graduates, Swain chose three as "Bible women" to help promote the religious mission of the hospital. In the 1890s, the Christian Medical College Ludhiana was founded to provide formalized medical courses in lieu of the basic training that the assistants were previously offered.

=== Furloughs ===
Accommodating the constant influx of patients, outpatient visits, and the rapidly increasing work eventually took a toll on Swain's physical and mental health, causing her to return to America in March 1876. On September 25, 1879, Swain left the states, and arrived at Bombay, India on November 6. She was then appointed to resume her work, in January 1880.

Her second return to America was triggered by a deterioration of health in both her sister and herself. She left Khetri, India in March 1888, and returned a year and a half later.

=== Clara Swain Hospital ===
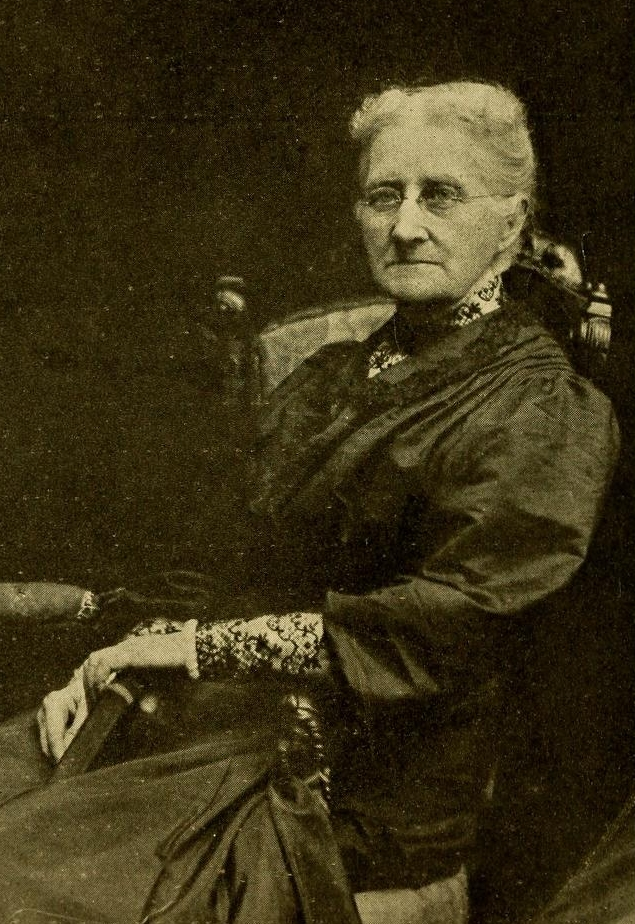
Swain in 1906

Although there had been indigenous resistance to Western medicine and religion in India, the mission had successfully procured an estate from the Nawab of Rampur, on which to expand medical facilities. Such was not an uncommon thread of families of princely states, since many of them in this area were in favor of "mission-sponsored initiatives for female education or medical work." In allotting the gift, The Nawab of Rampur was quoted saying, "Take it! It is yours! I give it to you with great pleasure for such a purpose."

On January 1, 1872, Swain moved her team over to the Nawab's former property. By May 1873, a dispensary building was erected and by January 1, 1874, the first in-estatehouse patients were treated. The completed hospital, known as the Clara Swain Hospital, was then the "first hospital for women in India." Soon after, Swain had accumulated many more visitors from neighboring states, including those traveling from as distant as Burma.

=== Later life and death ===
In 1909, James Pott & Co. published a collection of Swain's latters titled A Glimpse of India, which includes letters from the period 1869–1908. Dr. Swain spent the last year of her life in Castile, New York where she died on December 25, 1910. She is buried at Grace Cemetery.

== Bibliography ==
- "Clara A. Swain, M.D., First Medical Missionary to the Women of the Orient". Medicine & Evangelism. Woman's Foreign Missionary Society, Methodist Episcopal Church. 1912.
- Palace of Healing: The Story of Dr. Clara Swain, first woman missionary doctor, and the hospital she founded (1968)
- "A glimpse of India : being a collection of extracts from the letters Dr. Clara A. Swain, first medical missionary to India of the Woman's Foreign Missionary Society of the Methodist Episcopal Church in America". Medical Missionary Letters. James Pott and Company. 1909.
