= Journal of Stroke & Cerebrovascular Diseases =

- Discipline: Stroke Cardiology Neurology
- Language: English
- Edited by: Fernando D Testai

Publication details
- History: 1991-present
- Publisher: Elsevier
- Frequency: Bimonthly
- Impact factor: 2.677 (2021)

Standard abbreviations
- ISO 4: J. Stroke Cerebrovasc. Dis.

Indexing
- ISSN: 1052-3057 (print); 1532-8511 (web)
- LCCN: 92641817
- OCLC no.: 22248418

Links
- Journal homepage; Online access; Online archive

The Journal of Stroke & Cerebrovascular Diseases is a bimonthly peer-reviewed medical journal covering the study of stroke and other cerebrovascular diseases. It was established in 1991 and is published by Elsevier on behalf of the National Stroke Association and the Japan Stroke Society, of which it is the official journal. The editor-in-chief is Fernando D Testai (University of Illinois Chicago). According to the journal's website, it has a 2021 impact factor of 2.677.
