= Alice Sudduth Byerly =

American temperance philanthropist (1855–1904)

Alice Sudduth Byerly (June 18, 1855 – February 19, 1904) was an American temperance philanthropist. For several years, she was National Superintendent of the Flower Mission Department of the Woman's Christian Temperance Union (WCTU).

== Early years and education ==
Sudduth was born near Athens, Illinois, June 18, 1855. Her parents were Dr. James McCreary Sudduth (d. 1895) and Amanda Elizabeth (Ashmore) Sudduth (d. 1898). She had two siblings, a brother, Dr. William Xavier Sudduth, and a sister, Margaret Ashmore Sudduth. Her father had built up an extensive practice in Central Illinois before giving up the practice of medicine to become a banker and stock raiser.

She was converted in childhood, and brought up in the Presbyterian Church, of which her parents were members. When about eleven years of age, her parents moved to Normal, Illinois, for the purpose of educating their children. Here, and at Bloomington, Illinois, the family lived for twenty years.

She received her education in the public schools and Normal university, afterwards taking a course at Mills College, Oakland, California. Returning to her native state, she took up and completed a course in music in the Illinois Wesleyan University, and was an accomplished musician. She espoused with enthusiasm the work of the Chautauqua Literary and Scientific circle and completed a four year‘ course in that university, graduating in the class of 1886.

== Career ==
She was from her childhood an earnest Christian, and like thousands of other Christian young women, was captivated by Frances Willard. For several years she was National Superintendent of the Flower Mission Department of the WCTU, which was founded by Jennie Casseday. Under Byerly's influence, it became a great evangelistic agency. Unnumbered gifts of flowers with appropriate scripture texts attached, were distributed in prisons, hospitals and sick-chambers. While engaged in this work, she became interested in visiting the sick in hospitals and strangers far from home, always leaving a bunch of flowers, with a Scripture text attached, and learned to love the work so much that she continued it with enthusiasm as long as she lived.

In 1887, she moved with her parents to Colton, California, and spent eleven years there where her work was enlarged. The great number of consumptives who sought that climate often only to die far from home and among strangers greatly aroused her sympathies; And she went about with her fruits and flowers and cheering words among the victims of tuberculosis till her friends remonstrated lest she contract the disease herself. But it had become a passion with her and as long as she remained in California she continued these ministrations. Her father and mother both died in California and the family home among the orange trees was broken up.

Returning to Illinois shortly thereafter, she resigned from her position as National Superintendent of the Flower Mission Department in 1898. She married Rev. Alexander Clay Byerly in Springfield, Illinois May 15, 1900. It was his second marriage and he brought three small children with him into this union. She at once transferred her membership to the Methodist Episcopal Church, where, with such intelligence and consecration as she possessed, she could not fail to be a helpmate in the ministry. In the church at Lincoln, Illinois where her husband was pastor at the time of her marriage, she was greatly beloved. She was an inspiration to the young people of the Epworth League. Under her direction, the methods of the Flower Mission were applied in the Department of Mercy and Help with the most blessed spiritual results. She threw her whole soul into the work of the Woman's Foreign Missionary Society. She corresponded with many of the missionaries and always had something fresh from the field to talk about in the home and to present in the meetings.

== Death ==
In 1903, she developed a severe sickness from which she never fully recovered. A long siege of the grippe in the early part of the 1903-04 winter left her much debilitated. and it seemed impossible for her to recuperate in the rigorous climate of Illinois. So it was decided that she should go to Citronelle, Alabama for a few weeks. For about ten days after arrival there, she seemed rapidly recuperating. She wrote cheerful letters home telling of her progress. but the suddenly became prostrated with a severe bilious attack (severe indigestion). Various complications developed and she grew alarmingly worse until she died on February 19, 1904. The body was brought to the home in Springfield, and the funeral conducted in First Church. The remains were cremated in accordance with the wish of the deceased, and taken to Riverside, California, and interred in the family lot in Olivewood Memorial Park.
