= International Order of the King's Daughters and Sons =

Ecumenical Christian fraternal order founded in 1886

The insignia of the Order of the King's Daughters and Sons is a Maltese Cross, with the letters 'IHN" engraved on it, representing the watchword "In His Name".

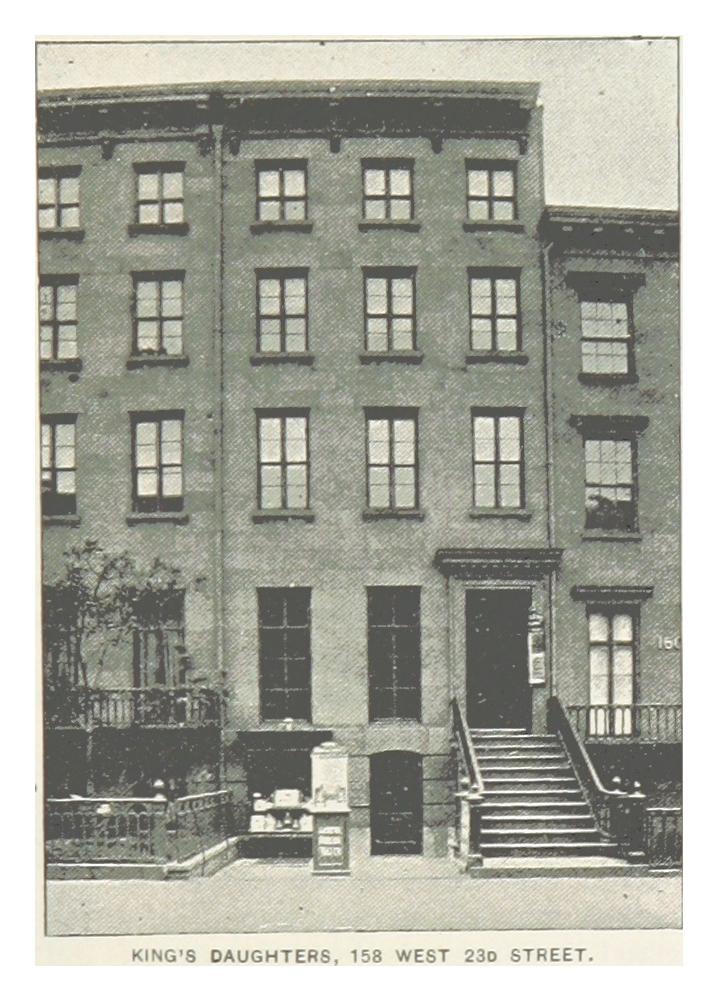
158 West 23rd Street in Manhattan, former headquarters of the Order, in 1893

Headquartered in Chautauqua, New York, the International Order of the King's Daughters and Sons (IOKDS) is an interdenominational Christian philanthropic organization and fraternal order established in 1886. Also known as "The King's Daughters and Sons" or "IOKDS", the organization's mission statement is derived from the Bible's Mark 10, verse 45: "Not to be ministered unto, but to minister." Its stated objective is: "The development of Spiritual Life and Stimulation of Christian Activity."

With a roster of between 3,500 and 4,000 members as of 2018, the majority of whom reside in Canada or the United States, its members have been active supporting hospitals, homes for the elderly, thrift shops, and child care centers, as well as in providing scholarships for people in the health fields, those mastering in divinity, and to Native Americans.

The organization is divided into "Circles" of three or more members; a state or province wide group of "Circles" are called "Branches". The Order was based in New York City until 1972, when it moved to its current residence at Chautauqua, New York. The International Order of the King's Daughters and Sons publishes a quarterly magazine titled The Silver Cross. The insignia of the International Order of the King's Daughters and Sons is a "silver cross as the outward symbol of their pledge of love and service and more than one thousand different lines of work upon which they have entered".

== History ==
Established in New York City, New York, in 1886 with a membership of ten founding Christian women who were active with Episcopal, Methodist, and Presbyterian churches in the area, the International Order of The King's Daughters and Sons held its first meeting on January 13 of that year at the New York City home of Margaret McDonald Bottome (1825–1906), a leader in the Methodist church who had become known for her hosting of Bible study sessions and other salons. Bottome reportedly was inspired to host the meeting by Edward Everett Hale, a Unitarian Christian minister who had risen to nationwide prominence as an abolitionist and writer for the Atlantic Monthly prior to the American Civil War, and had then achieved wider name recognition through his establishment and promotion of "Lend-A-Hand" clubs across America — the motto of which became "Look up and not down, look forward and not back, look out and not in, and lend a hand."

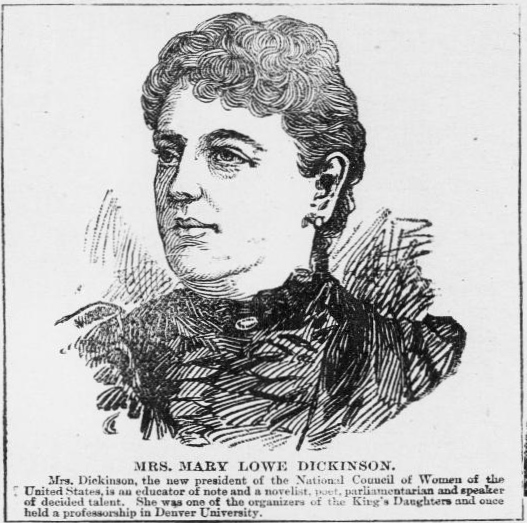
Mary Lowe Dickinson, 1895.

Invited by Bottome to attend that initial meeting were eight of the fraternal order's other nine founding members, who were Christian friends of Bottome: Mary Lowe Dickinson, Mrs. C. DePeyster Field, Helen Hammersley, Mrs. Theo. Irving, Georgia Libby, Mary F. Payson, Mrs. J. F. Ruggles, and Susan B. Schenck. Isabella Charles Davis also became one of the organization's first ten members, with these founders being known as the "Original Ten". As new chapters were formed, each was allowed to choose its own service mission and initially referred to as a "Ten" rather than a "chapter" — a designation which was later changed to "Circle". Since its inception, the Order of the King's Daughters and Sons has upheld ecumenism with regard to Christians of denominational backgrounds working together in service to the sick and poor.

Elected as president of the organization, Bottome held that post until her death in 1906. Irving has been credited as the founding member who suggested the organization's name, "The King's Daughters". Dickinson, who was appointed as the organization's general secretary in 1887 and then held that post for the remainder of her life, launched and became editor of the group's magazine, The Silver Cross, in 1888, and also penned the lyrics for the group's hymn, Lead Now as Forth We Go, which were set to the music of Nearer My God to Thee. In addition to helping to raise the profile of The King's Daughters and Sons via articles published in newspapers across the United States and lectures before audiences at such venues as the Dansville Water Cure, Dickinson was later also elected president of the National Council of Women of the United States.

Membership quickly grew to 50,000 women and expanded from chapters across the United States to include circles in countries across the globe. One of America's earliest chapters was the Lend-A-Hand Club in Davenport, Iowa. Offering a safe environment to socialize for women living and working away from their homes, the club was an affiliate of Hale's Lend-A-Hand network, and operated from various locations throughout its history, including a department store in the city's downtown area. As the club grew, so did its amenities, which included a bath and shower area, cafeteria, gymnasium, laundry, parlor, and reading rooms. Arts and crafts programs were offered as were lecture series on women's topics. By 1922, club leaders had raised enough money to construct the organization's own facility, a building which was located on South Main Street across from the Dillon Memorial. Housed here from the time of the building's completion until the club's closing during the 1960s, the club presented lectures addressing women's suffrage and workplace issues, and offered members access to dormitory rooms and a swimming pool.

After men and boys began requesting admission in 1887, the organization began expanding its membership base further and, in 1891, changed its name to The King's Daughters and Sons. By 1896, Canada's chapter had grown to 6,000 members with 26 branches in the United States. Circles had also been formed in Europe, Japan, China, Syria and India.

In 1909, the organization's state board of directors in Ohio built Rock Ledge Inn as a summer school for its members. In addition to providing religion classes, the facility offered respite opportunities.

In October 1911, the organization's Connecticut chapter held its 16th annual convention in Bridgeport at that city's First M.E. Church. Among those in attendance were the international organization's president and general secretary, Kate Bond and Mary Lowe Dickinson.

The international organization then hosted its first general convention in Louisville, Kentucky in 1912 By 1914, the organization's Ohio board of directors had begun charging members $6 per week for members to stay at the group's Rock Ledge Inn. In 1935, the board launched a junior camp for girls 12 and up to participate in archery, nature studies and other activities.

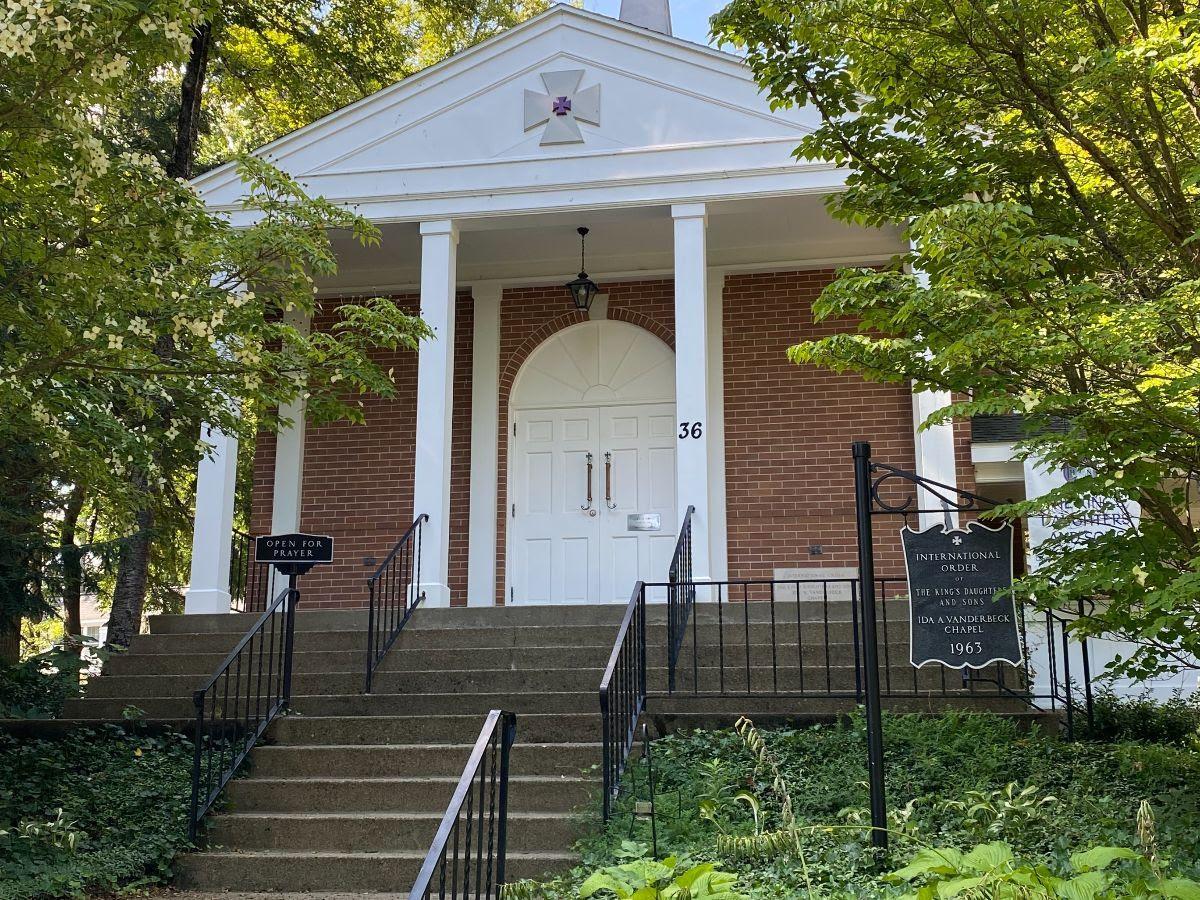
The present day IOKDS Headquarters in Chautauqua, New York

In 1972, the organization moved its headquarters from New York City to Chautauqua, New York.

In 2018, the organization closed its thrift store in Moline, Illinois, which was reportedly one of the longest running resale operations in the Quad-Cities region of the United States. The store, which launched in 1927, had relocated several times until finding a home, during the 1960s, in the city's Berglund Building on 1321 5th Avenue in Moline. The organization's first Quad-Cities group was founded by Katherine Deere Butterworth, a granddaughter of John Deere.

== Motto and symbol ==
According to Sue Buck, who penned a brief history about the group, leaders of the organization adopted a small, silver Maltese cross as the badge to be worn by members, and chose the words "In His Name" as the phrase members would use as their "watchword". The organization's motto was derived from the motto adopted by Edward Everett Hale's Lend-A-Hand Clubs, and remains:

Look up and not down,
Look forward and not back,
Look out and not in, And lend a hand.

== Membership ==
Christian individuals belonging to any denomination (e.g. Anglican, Baptist, Brethren, Bruderhof, Evangelical-Lutheran, Hutterite, Methodist, Mennonite, Moravian, Nondenominational, Orthodox, Quaker, Reformed, Roman Catholic) who wish to undertake service work in the name of Jesus are eligible for membership in the International Order of the King's Daughters and Sons. This reflects the commitment to an interdenominational (ecumenical) Christian effort to undertake charitable work "In His Name".

The fraternal order is organized primarily through local units known as Circles, which serve as the basic unit of the organization. Circles focus on local service initiatives and support broader organizational programs. Individuals who do not belong to a Circle or live in areas without a Branch may join as Members-at-Large.

At a broader level, Branches represent geographic subdivisions (such as states or provinces) and are established when at least fifty members are enrolled. Additional organizational structures include Chapters, which are formed around shared interests or activities and may include members from multiple locations, and District, County, and City Unions, which provide administrative and advisory support between Circles and Branches.

The fraternal order offers Junior Membership for individuals from birth through age seventeen, allowing younger members to participate in Circles and organizational activities.

== Notable people ==
- Jennie Casseday
- Mary Lowe Dickinson
- Sarah E. Fuller
- Birdie Robertson Johnson

== See also ==
- Woman's Christian Temperance Union
