= Lisa Anne Fletcher =

American poet and correspondent (1844–1905)

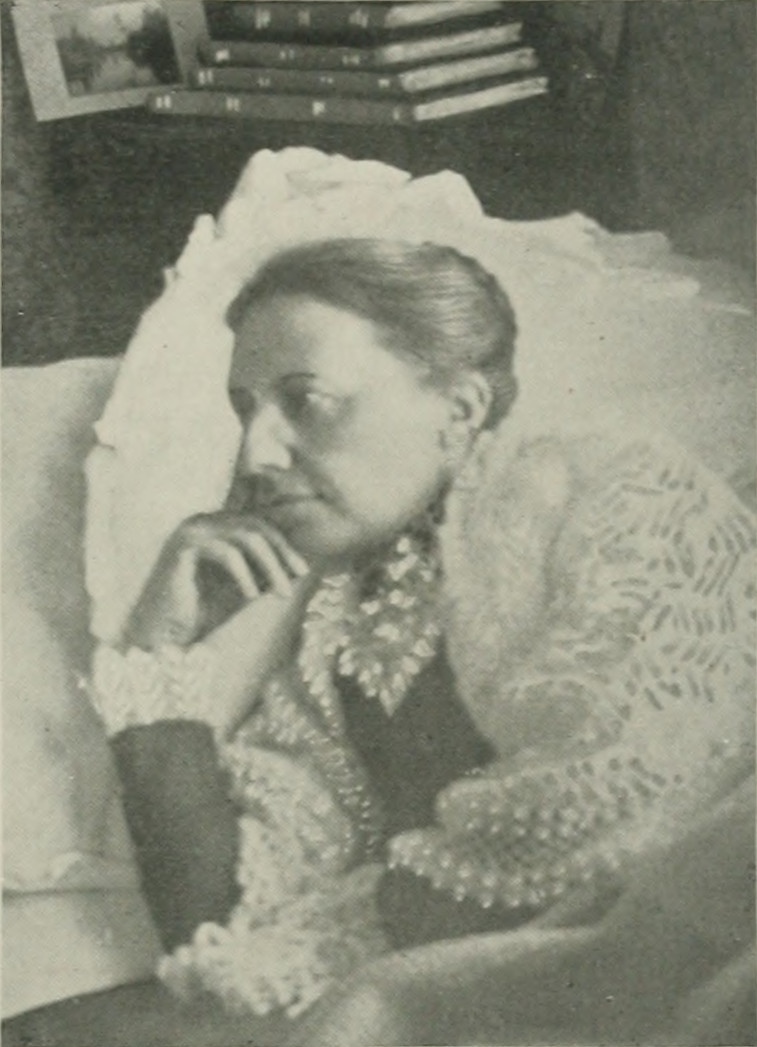
- "A Woman of the Century"
- Born: Lisa Anne Stewart; December 27, 1844; Ashby, Massachusetts, U.S.
- Died: July 13, 1905 (aged 60); Manchester, New Hampshire, U.S.
- Other name: "Lizzie"
- Occupations: poet; correspondent
- Spouse: Edwin Samuel Fletcher (m. 1864)
- Writing career
- Genre: letter writing
- Literary movement: Shut-in Society

Lisa Anne Fletcher (née, Stewart; December 27, 1844 – July 13, 1905) was an American poet and letter writer. She was widely known as artist, poet and correspondent. She was incapacitated for nearly 40 years by the lasting effects of malignant diphtheria, and during most of that period was bedridden, becoming a member of the Shut-in Society in 1878.

== Early life ==
Lisa (nickname, "Lizzie") Anne Stewart was born in Ashby, Massachusetts, December 27, 1844. Her parents were Charles Stewart and Eliza (Derby) Stewart. When she was two years old, her father died, and when she was 16, her mother died. She was an only child. From earliest childhood, she showed an almost equal fondness for music, painting and poetry.

== Career ==
In 1865, at the age of 20, the newly-wed Fletcher, now living in Manchester, New Hampshire, contracted diphtheria in its most severe form. In her later years, she was bedridden, and worked in a reclining position. She kept a large correspondence, partly through the Shut-in Society. She wrote thousands of letters, and fulfilled the Society's mission of offering cheer and comfort to others. In later years, she was a member of the Tribune sunshine society, to which she contributed in similar fashion.

In June, 1888, Fletcher began to write verse in earnest, mostly descriptive of objects and aspects in nature. Her poems' spirit of cheerfulness and hopefulness appealed to thousands who knew nothing of Fletcher's own story, and which appeared amazing to those who knew it in a general way, but did not understand the sources from which her cheerfulness and contentment sprang. Many of her poems were collected in a volume entitled Beside Still Waters, while many others remained fugitive. She contributed regularly to more than 30 newspapers and magazines.

Fletcher painted a collection of wildflowers that grew about Manchester, New Hampshire. The collection represented more than 300 species and was frequently exhibited. Many of the works had a place in the World's Columbian Exposition (Chicago, 1893).

Stewart's love for birds amounted to a passion. From her chair, she studied the wild birds outside her window and sketched and painted them. She was a local secretary of the Audubon Society. Fletcher conducted a wide correspondence with nature lovers, and bird lovers in particular.

== Personal life ==
In 1864, she married Edwin Samuel Fletcher (1883–1923), of Manchester, since which time her home was in that city.

Lisa Anne Fletcher died in Manchester, New Hampshire, July 13, 1905.

== Selected works ==
- Beside Still Waters (New York, Anson D.F. Randolph & Company, 1899)
