= Eva Moore (disambiguation) =

Eva Moore (1868–1955) was an English actress.

Eva Moore may also refer to:

- Eva Perry Moore, American clubwoman
- Eva Moore (Doctors), a character in the soap opera Doctors
- Eva Moore, a character in the TV series iZombie
