= Amelia Stone Quinton =

American social activist and advocate

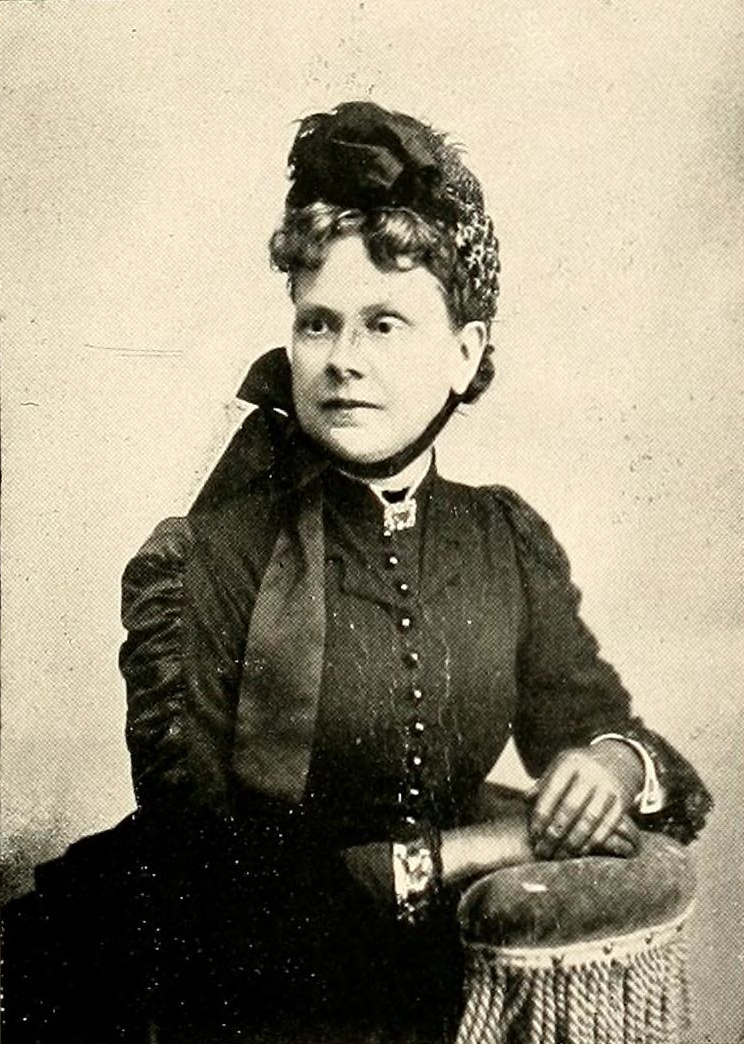
- Born: Amelia Stone; July 31, 1833; Jamesville, New York
- Died: June 23, 1926 (aged 92); Ridgefield Park, New Jersey
- Occupation: activist
- Known for: Women's National Indian Association

Amelia Stone Quinton (born Amelia Stone on July 31, 1833 – June 23, 1926) was an American social activist and advocate for Native American rights. In collaboration with Mary Bonney, she helped found the Women's National Indian Association in 1883.

She served as the association's president from 1887 to 1904; during this time the association made progress in advancing the rights of Native Americans. They supported passage of the Dawes Severalty Act by Congress in 1887, which provided individual households of Native Americans in Indian Territory with portions of land for farming, and United States citizenship. Senator Henry Dawes (R-Massachusetts), sponsor of the act, later said that "the new government Indian policy was born of and nursed by this women' association."

== Life ==
Amelia Stone was born on July 31, 1833, in Jamesville, New York, near Syracuse, to Mary (née Bennett) and Jacob Thompson Stone. She was tutored by Samuel B. Woolworth in Homer.

After Stone married Reverend James Franklin Swanson, they lived in Georgia for several years for his work. He died before her. The widow Stone married Richard L. Quinton in London, who was an astronomy and history lecturer. She took his surname.

Stone taught for a year in a Georgia seminary. Following her husband's death, she returned to the North and taught for a year in the Chestnut Street Seminary of Philadelphia. Next she turned to religious and philanthropic work.

At first her volunteer work was among the poor of New York City, where she had weekly engagements in various institutions. She served one day of the week was spent in the prison, the almshouse, or the workhouse, and another in some infirmary or reformatory for women. She also provided a weekly Bible-class for sailors.

During the first temperance crusade in Brooklyn, she joined the band of workers. She was invited to go out and represent the work, to organize unions, and, a little later, was elected by the State Woman's Christian Temperance Union as state organizer.

She went to Europe for a year's rest. After a few months on the continent, she was drawn into temperance work in England and addressed drawing-room and church meetings in London and other cities. On the voyage to England, she met Professor Richard Quinton, a native of London and a lecturer on historical and astronomical subjects. A year later they married in London, where they continued to reside for some months. She returned to America in the autumn of 1878, and together the couple lived in Philadelphia, where Prof. Quinton resumed his lecturing.

In April 1879, her friend, Mary L. Bonney, became deeply stirred on the subject of national wrongs to Indians, especially allowing European-American settlement in Indian Territory. She presided over a missionary society which sought to circulate a petition on the subject. The anniversary occasion was already overcrowded with topics, and the petition was not presented or read. A few weeks later Bonney presented more information to Quinton, and they began to plan together.

Bonney agreed to supply the means needed for printing, and Quinton to plan and work; she studied in libraries, prepared literature and petitions and circulated them through the sympathizers and helpers she gained in many states.

The first petition was enlarged and she prepared a leaflet of facts and special appeal, and sent those out widely to leading citizens, and to women in many kinds of Christian and philanthropic work. Signatures to the petition were returned from thirteen States, and were collected in a roll three-hundred-feet long. This was presented to Congress in February 1880.

At the end of that year the pair had organized a committee of eight. At their first meeting Quinton was elected as secretary of the committee. Three months later Bonney was elected chairman. In June 1881 the constitution drafted by Quinton was adopted, and the society that day elected an executive board, nominated at her request by the pastors of the churches, and became known as the Indian Treaty-keeping and Protective Association.

Quinton began the work of wider organization and organized thirteen associate committees in five states before the close of the year. In the memorial letter which she wrote to accompany the petition of 1881, she petitioned Congress to bring Indians into voluntary citizenship by making that to their interest, rather than by the coercion of acts of Congress.

In her petition for January 1882, universal Indian education, lands in severalty, and the full rights of citizenship for Indians were addressed. At that date the society had sixteen State committees, all of which she revisited and reorganized as permanent auxiliaries. A memorable discussion in the Senate over that third petition, which had signatures of a hundred thousand citizens, was closed by Senator Henry L. Dawes.

Now known as the Women's National Indian Association, the organization established branches, officers or helpers in forty states. It had founded more than twenty missions in Indian tribes since 1884. During 1891, its missionary work was done in fifteen tribes.

After Bonney retired from the presidency of the association, in November 1884, Mary Lowe Dickinson was elected to the office. In 1887 Quinton as unanimously elected president.

She bore a government commission and did service also on behalf of Indian education.

She died on June 23, 1926, at her home in Ridgefield Park, New Jersey.
