= Schary =

Schary is a surname. Notable people with the surname include:

- Dore Schary (1905–1980), American playwright, director, producer and screenwriter
- Hope Skillman Schary (c. 1908–1981), American textile designer and business executive
