= WNIA =

WNIA may refer to:

- WNIA (FM), a radio station (89.1 FM) licensed to Tarboro, North Carolina, United States
- WECK, a radio station (1230 AM) licensed to Cheektowaga, New York, which held the call sign WNIA from 1956 to 1979
- Women's National Indian Association
