= National Council of Women of the United States =

Women's council

The National Council of Women of the United States (NCW/US) is the oldest nonsectarian organization of women in the United States Founded in 1888, the NCW/US is an accredited non-governmental organization (NGO) with the Department of Public Information (UN/DPI) and in Consultative Status with the Economic and Social Council of the United Nations (ECOSOC).

== Establishment ==
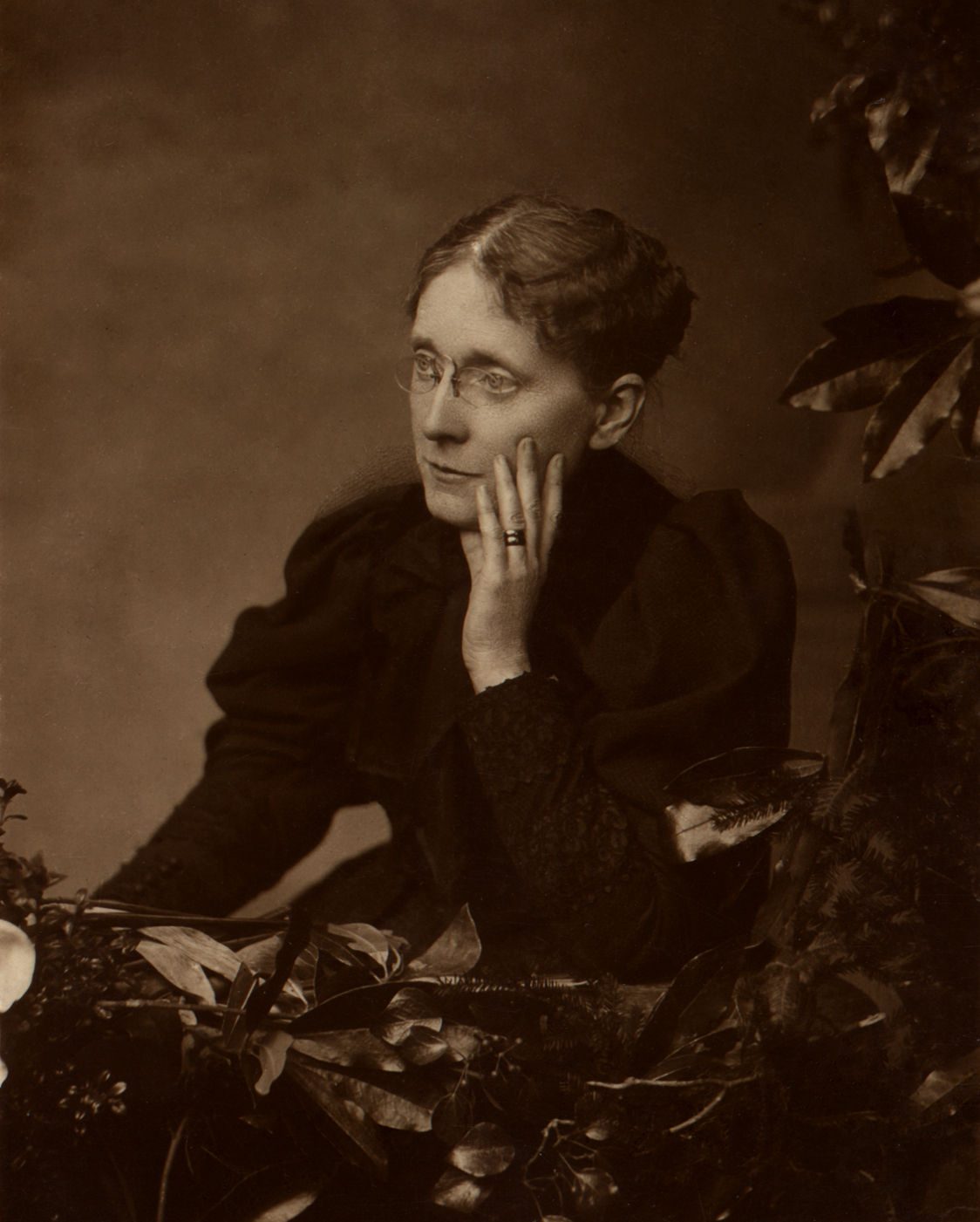
Frances Willard, President

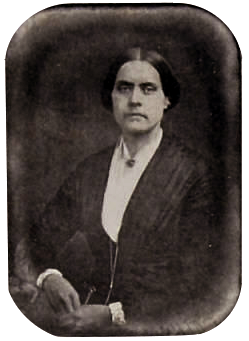
Susan B. Anthony, Vice President

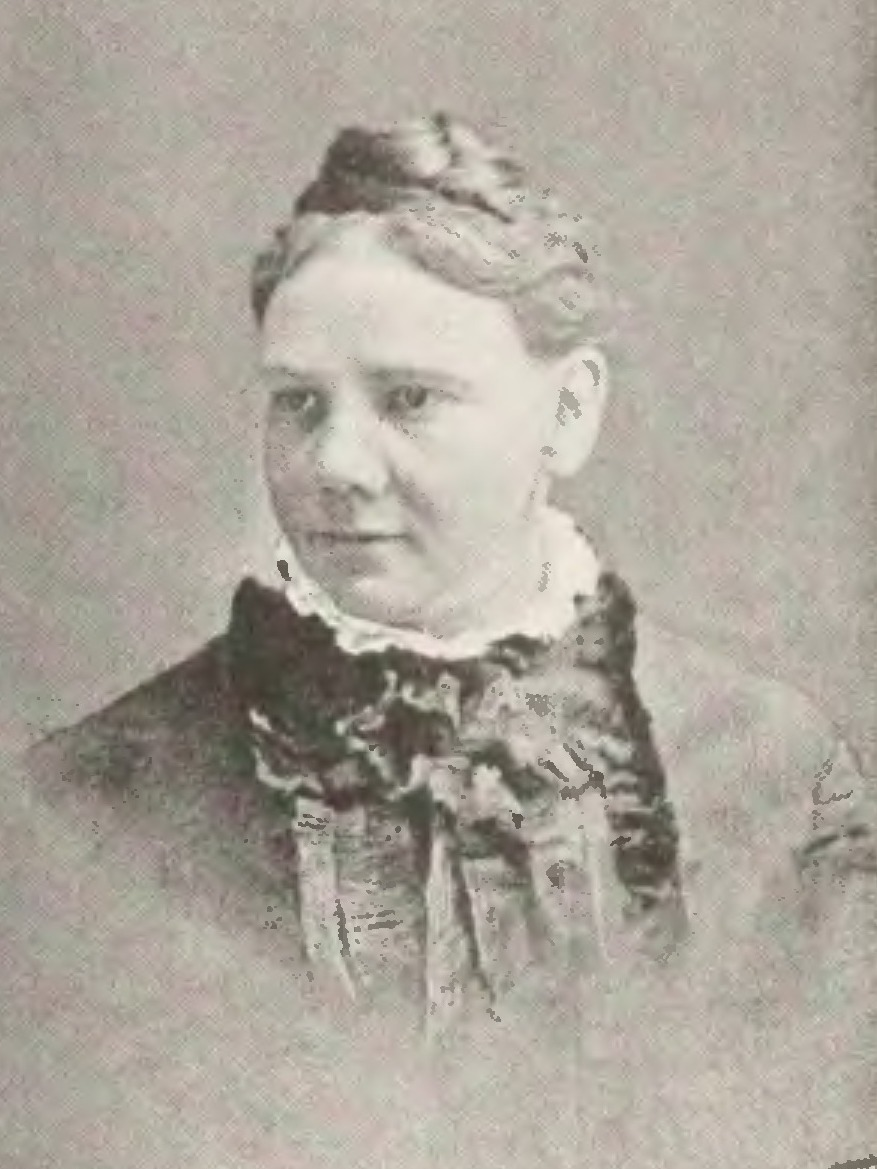
Mary F. Eastman, Recording Secretary

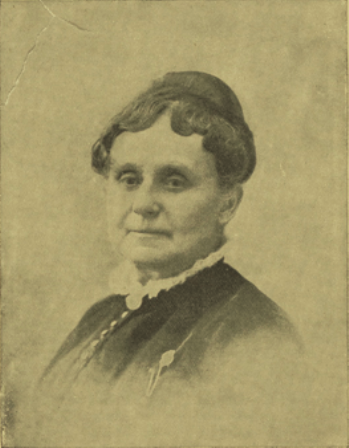
M. Louise Thomas, Treasurer

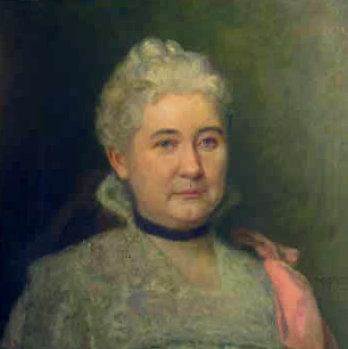
May Wright Sewall, Corresponding Secretary

During the preparations of 1887–1888 for the meeting of the International Council of Women, May Wright Sewall, an active member of the Committee of Arrangements, conceived the idea of finalizing the results of that gathering of women into permanent organizations focused on the uplifting of humanity. From her elaborated thought arose the permanent International Council of Women and the National Council of Women of the United States, both organized, and their central boards of officers elected, March 31, 1888, in Washington, D.C. The first official officers of the National Council of Women of the United States were Frances Willard, President; Susan B. Anthony, Vice President; Mary F. Eastman, Recording Secretary; M. Louise Thomas, Treasurer; May Wright Sewall, Corresponding Secretary. They adopted and presented the following preamble:

"We, women of the United States of America, believe that the best good of humanity will be advanced by efforts toward greater unity of sympathy and purpose, and that a voluntary association of individuals so united will best serve the highest good of the family, the community, the state, do hereby freely band ourselves together into a federation of all races, creeds, and traditions, to further the application of the Golden Rule to society, custom, and law."

All national organizations of women, interested in the advancement of women's work in education, philanthropy, reform, and social culture, were welcome to join. When an organization entered the council, its president became an acting vice-president in the council, and it also had the right to appoint one person to represent it on the executive board of the council. This board included the general officers of the council, together with the presidents of all organizations belonging to it, and one delegate besides its president from every organization. This board also constituted a committee of arrangements for the first triennial meeting of the council.

The constitution of the NCW/US called for triennial meetings of this organization to be held at Washington, D.C. At the close of the various business meetings of 1888 connected with the International Council of Women, it was agreed that the NCW/US would hold the first of the triennial meeting, provided for by its constitution, in February 1891 at the Albaugh's Opera House. The central board of officers was responsible for arranging this meeting.

== Member organizations ==
The National Council of Women is an affiliate of the International Council of Women. The following organizations are affiliates of the National Council of Women/US: NANBPWC, Delta Sigma Theta sorority, Nation to Nation Networking, Knowledge iTrust, Pan-Pacific and Southeast Asia Women's Association, Sigma Gamma Rho sorority, Sister To Sister International, Soroptimist International, Ukrainian National Women's League of America, National Council of Women of New Zealand, International Health Awareness Network, National Council of Ghanaian Associations, United Nations Association of America (Tampa Bay, FL Chapter), Voices of African Mothers, and Zeta Phi Beta sorority.

== Past presidents ==
- Saideh Brown
- Iryna Kurowyckyj
- Belle S. Spafford, 1968-1970
- Mary Lowe Dickinson, 1895-1897
- Eva Perry Moore
- Rose Parsons, 1956
- Vera Rivers
- Hope Skillman Schary, 1970-1972
- May Wright Sewall, 1897-1899
- Mary E. Singletary
- Suzanne Stutman
- Mary Wood Swift, 1903-1909
- Frances E. Willard, 1888-1890
- Merrinelle Rice Sullivan

== Gallery ==
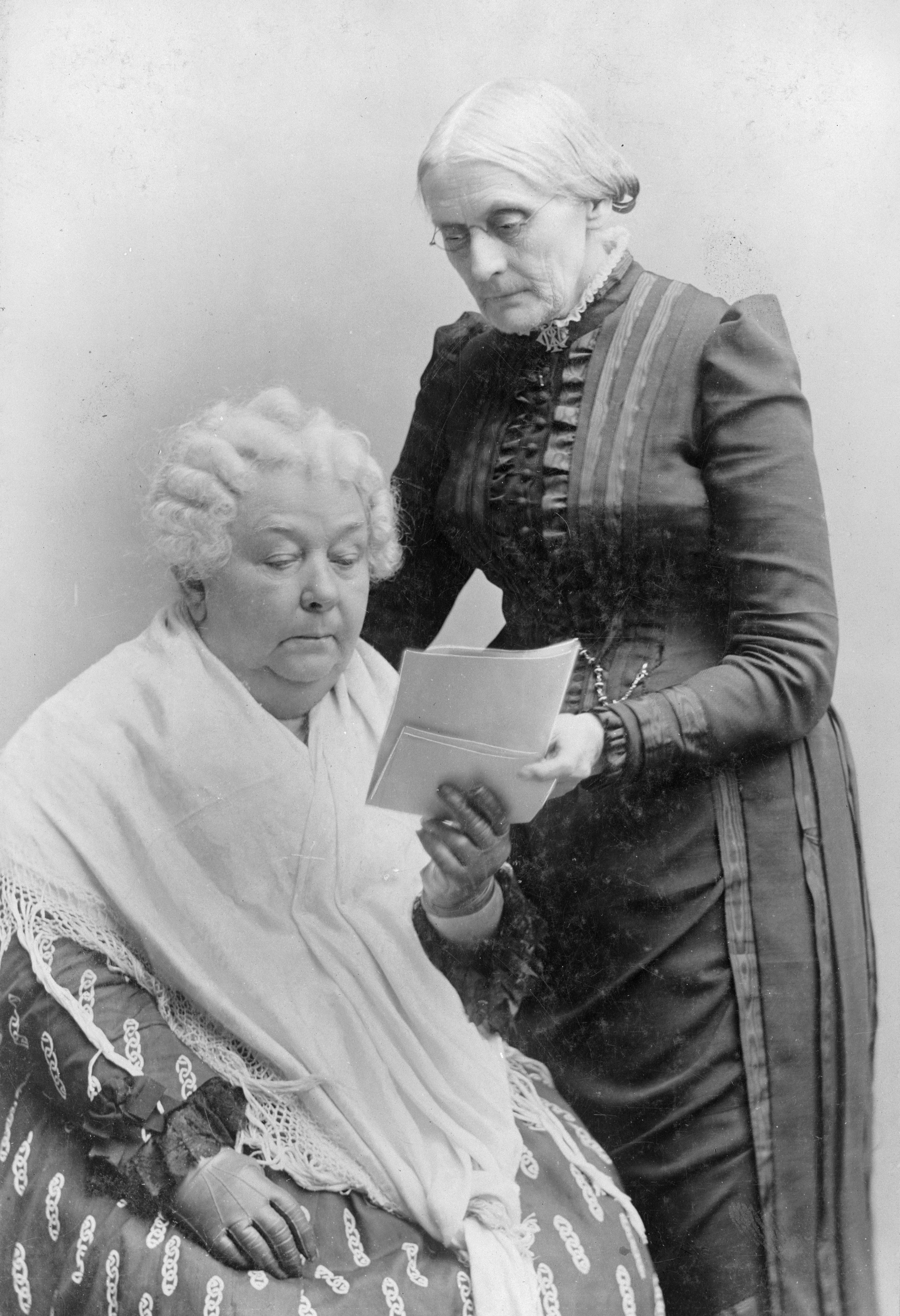
Elizabeth Cady Stanton, Susan B. Anthony

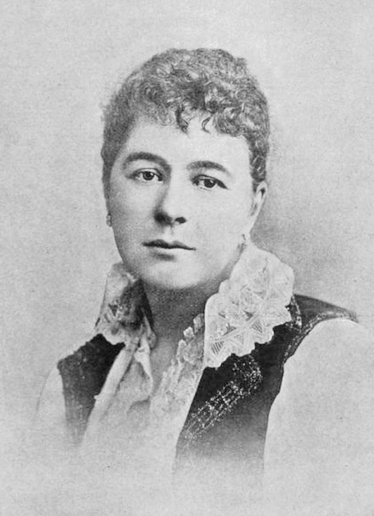
Countess Aberdeen

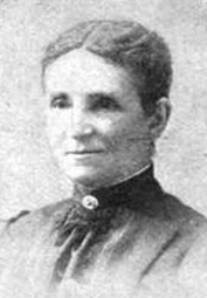
Hannah Johnston Bailey

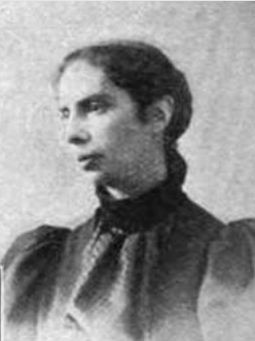
Alice Stone Blackwell

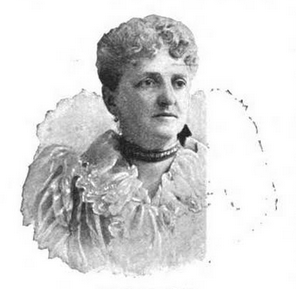
Lillie Devereux Blake

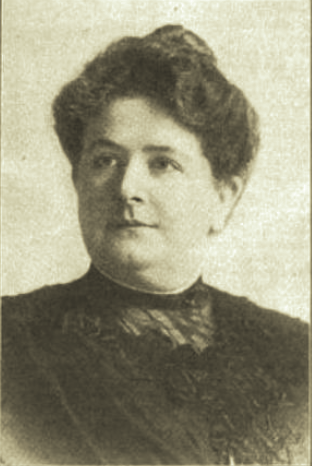
Frances E. Burns

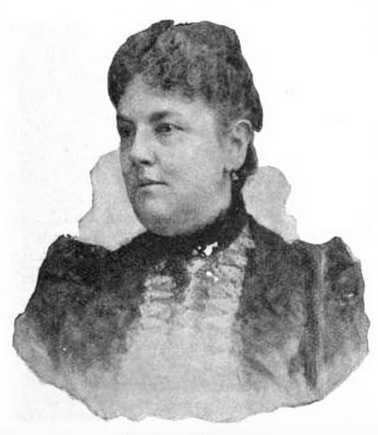
Mary Lowe Dickinson

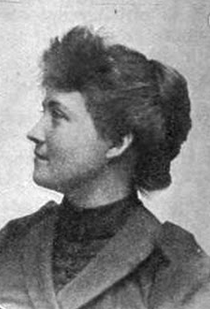
Miriam Howard Dubose

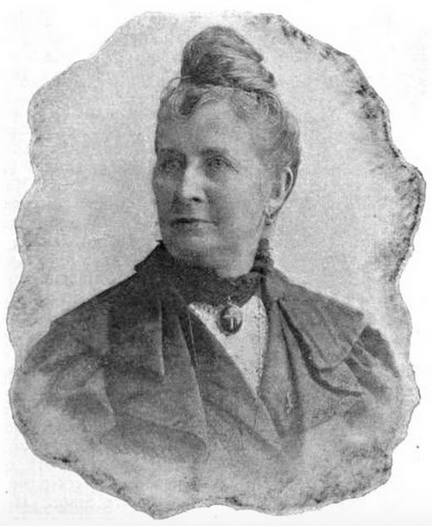
Imogene Corinne Franciscus Fales

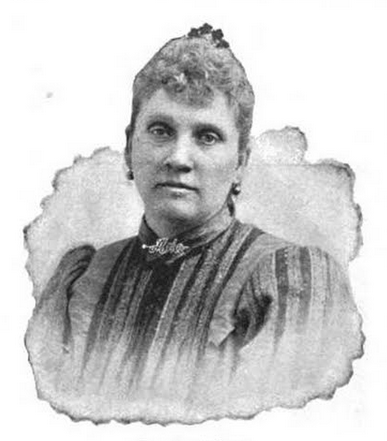
Susa Young Gates

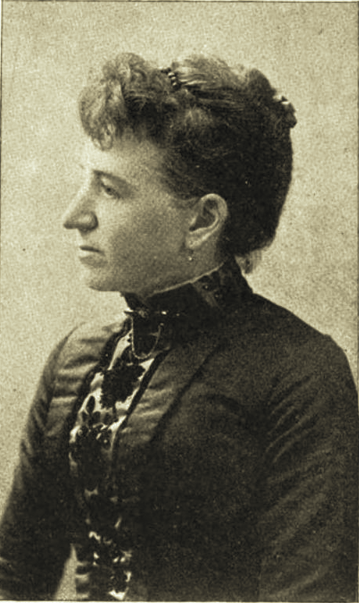
Emma Stark Hampton

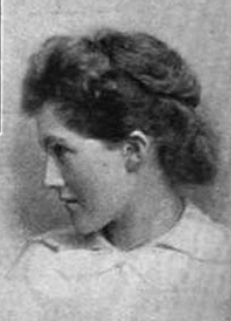
Helen Augusta Howard

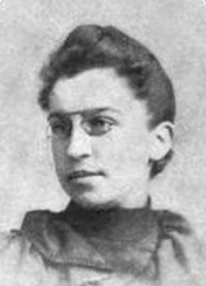
Josephine Humpal-Zeman

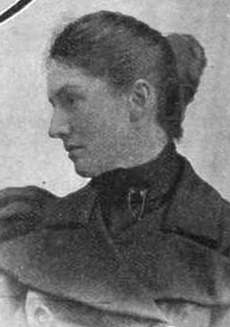
Claudia Howard Maxwell

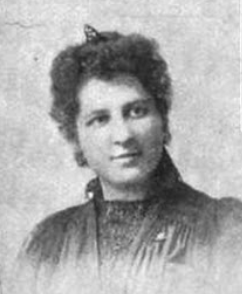
Bina West Miller

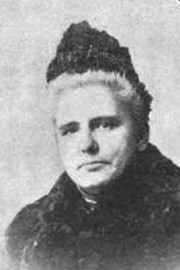
Anna Howard Shaw

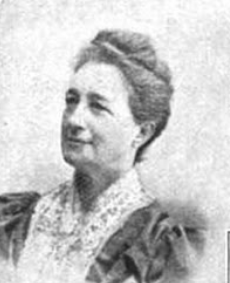
Kate Brownlee Sherwood

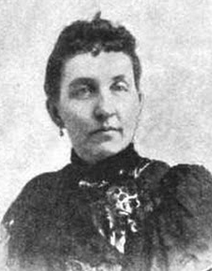
Minnie Jensen Snow

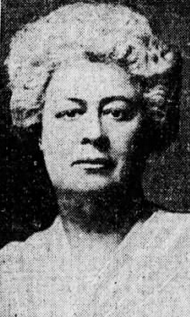
Mary Wood Swift

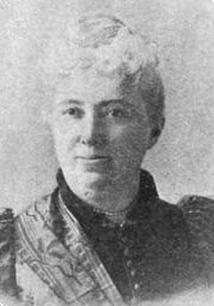
Louise Rockwood Wardner

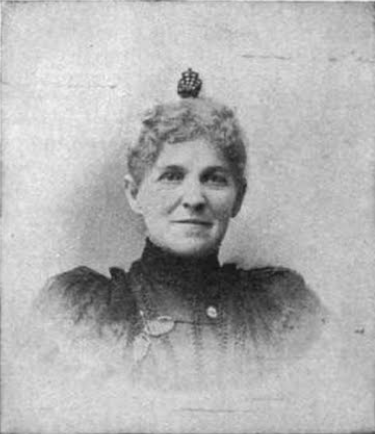
Anne E. Wastell

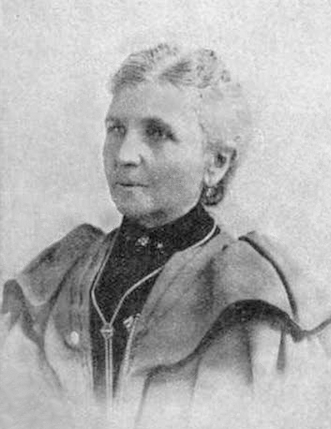
Emmeline B. Wells
