= Mary Lowe Dickinson =

American fiction writer, poet, editor, educator (1839–1914)

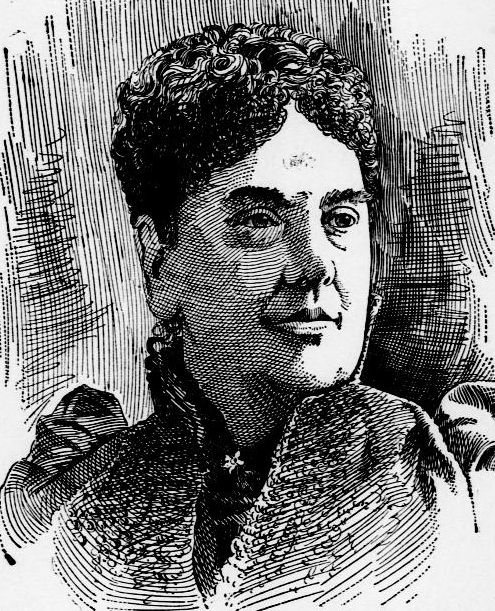
- Born: Mary Caroline Underwood; January 23, 1839; Fitchburg, Massachusetts
- Died: June 1914 (aged 75); New York
- Occupations: Activist, author, editor, and educator
- Known for: Co-founder, the International Order of the King’s Daughters and Sons; president, National Council of Women of the United States
- Spouses: George P. Lowe (m. 1858-circa 1863; his death); John B. Dickinson (m. circa 1867–1875; his death)
- Parent(s): Timothy Underwood (1803–1863), Ruth (Burgess) Underwood (1805–1869)

Mary Lowe Dickinson (née Mary Caroline Underwood, January 23, 1839 – June 1914) was a 19th- and early 20th-century American fiction writer, poet, editor, and educator who also became an advocate for women's rights and anti-war activist.

Asked later in life about her decision to pursue the writing life, she observed: "Talent uses us.... If I had had a spark of it, I could not have waited for circumstances to force me to use it."

== Formative years ==
Born in Fitchburg, Massachusetts, on January 23, 1839, Mary Caroline Underwood (later known as Mary Lowe Dickinson) was a daughter of Ruth (Burgess) Underwood (1805–1869), a native of Warren, Rhode Island, and Timothy Underwood (1803–1863), a native of Swanzey, New Hampshire, who had become the owner-operator of a livery and stage coach route based in Fitchburg.

She was raised in Fitchburg with her siblings: Harriet Alice (1825–1887), who later married Luke Wellington; Ann Elizabeth (1827–1844); Charlotte Hoar (1829–1891); Hannah Fidelia (1831–1882), who later wed Charles James Frye; James Burgess (born 1833), who died in the Utah Territory while in service with the 2nd California Cavalry; Abby Sophia (1835–1914), who later married Joel Willard Sheldon; Edward Monroe (1837–1921); George Henry (1841–1894); William Waldo (1843–1880); and Albert Greenwood (born 1845), who died on November 11, 1845, at the age of 7 months, and was laid to rest at the Laurel Hill Cemetery in Fitchburg.

Her father was described as a laborer on 1850 federal and 1855 Massachusetts census records and as a hostler on the federal census of 1860.

Educated in the common schools of her community she became a teacher in the small school of a neighboring village in 1854 when she was just 15 years old. As she became more adept as an educator, she was appointed as the head assistant of a school in Boston, and then was awarded the job of assistant principal at the Hartford Female Seminary.

On April 3, 1858, she wed George P. Lowe in Fitchburg, Worcester County. A seaman and fellow Fitchburg native, he was a son of Stephen and Susan Lowe. Widowed by him soon thereafter while he was traveling abroad, she also sustained another loss in 1863 when her father died in Fitchburg at the age of 60 on September 30, and was laid to rest at the same cemetery – Laurel Hill – where her youngest brother had been interred 18 years earlier.

Already greatly respected for her abilities as an educator and administrator by the time she was 24 years old, she was offered the job of vice-principal of the newly-established Vassar College in 1863, which she declined, choosing instead to pursue further training in Europe. Traveling as a tutor with a female student and her family, she wrote regularly for thirteen publications, including the New York Tribune. After her term of service ended due to her student's marriage, she was then hired as a tutor by a family from Chicago, becoming so close that she was treated as a member of that family for many years thereafter.

Upon her return to New York during the fall of 1867, she was awarded the position of acting principal of the Van Norman Institute, one of the city’s elite and most successful boarding schools.

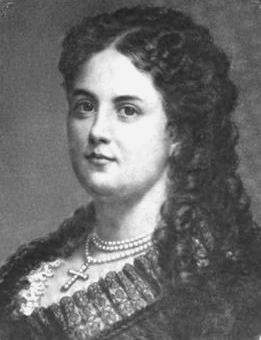
Mary Lowe Dickinson's portrait was painted by Theodore Pine in 1870 (black and white version of the original; Heaven, Home and Happiness, 1901).

Around this same time, she became the second wife of John B. Dickinson (1814–1875), a New York native who had become a highly successful and wealthy businessman. In 1871, the couple embarked on an extended trip overseas. Making Italy their home base for three years, they ventured forth on periodic excursions, including a voyage along the Nile River aboard a Dahabeah during the winter of 1872–1873, during which she wrote her poem "If We Had But a Day".

Tragically, she was widowed a second time when her husband, John B. Dickinson, died suddenly of a stroke on March 16, 1875 while on a stopover in Chicago en route to San Francisco. According to the Fitchburg Sentinel:

John B. Dickinson, the senior member of the firm of Dickinson & Co., bankers of New York city, died on Tuesday last in Chicago, of apoplexy, while on his way to visit his daughter, Mrs. Sherwood, in San Francisco. Mr. Dickinson was born in New York in 1814, but lived with an uncle in North Carolina until he was sixteen years old. He then returned to New York.... He was a director in the National Shoe and Leather Bank, the Union Mutual Insurance Company, the Broadway Insurance Company and the Brooklyn Dry Dock Company. He was also at one time president of the Tenth National Bank. Mr. Dickinson amassed a large fortune by his industry and business capacity. He was twice married and is survived by his second wife, four sons and four daughters. Mr. Dickinson was known to some of our citizens, having married for his second wife Mrs. Mary C. Lowe, formerly of this city.

Following funeral services at St. Paul’s Methodist Episcopal Church, located at the corner of New York City's Twenty-second Street and Fourth Avenue, her husband was laid to rest at the Green-Wood Cemetery in Brooklyn, New York. According to The New York Times, “The ceremony [at the church] was witnessed by a congregation of relatives, friends, and business associates that crowded the building in every part. Exceptionally rich and costly floral offerings decorated the altar and chancel. The services were begun with the singing of the hymn, ‘Nearer My God to Thee.’”

Shortly thereafter, she began work as head of a Brooklyn school's department of literature and composition, but then resigned that position in favor of work as a private tutor. During this time, she entered a period of her life throughout which she battled serious financial hardships. Multiple biographers and newspapers have documented that, two years after being widowed, the fortune she had inherited from her late husband was gone. Howard J. Banker described her savings as "suddenly swept away." The contacts she had built as an educator and advocate for women, however, helped her survive. According to Banker, "She was offered important positions in Wellesley, Northwestern University, Vassar, the University of Denver, and the University of Southern California." In 1888, she chose to become "the Chair of Literature in the University of Denver, where she labored for two years with such zeal and earnestness that her health became impaired and she was compelled to retire." According to The Gazette of Fort Worth, Texas, she was paid “the same salary as a man in a corresponding position” during her time there.

== Editorial and writing life ==
According to biographer William Emerson, Mary Lowe Dickinson "wrote leaders for dailies, editorials for weeklies, serials, short travels, poems, articles on education and philanthropy, and Sunday School lessons, never free enough to work in any favorite line, but always shaping her work to suit the demand of the hour." In addition, she wrote about the lives and work of: Charles Kingsley, Harriet Martineau, George Sand, and others; edited The Open Window, a magazine produced by convalescing patients and other invalids by the Shut-in Society; served as an associate editor for the philanthropic magazine published by Edward Everett Hale and his Lend a Hand Society; contributed "A Tour Around the World" to the November 1882 edition of Chautauquan; and penned “Women of the Period” for Harper’s Bazaar.

=== Poetry ===
- Dickinson, Mary Lowe. Easter Greeting (collection). New York, New York: H. H. B. Angell, publisher, c. 1885. OCLC 11263878
- Dickinson, Mary Lowe. Edelweiss: An Alpine Rhyme (collection). New York, New York: Self-published, 1876. OCLC 4803688
- Dickinson, Mary Lowe. Home from the War: A Rhyme of Thanksgiving. New York, New York: Self-published, 1898. OCLC 11263875
- Dickinson, Mary Lowe. In the Afterglow: Poems by Mary Lowe Dickinson (collection). New York, New York: Self-published, 1905. OCLC 616786177
- Dickinson, Mary Lowe. The Living Christ: Easter Thoughts for the King's Daughters (collection). New York, New York: F. H. Revell Co., 1891. [No ISBN or OCLC found for this publication, but a digitized version is available at the University of Michigan's HathiTrust.]

=== Prose ===
- Dickinson, Mary Lowe. Address of the President, Mrs. J.B. Dickinson, at the Annual Meeting of the Women's National Indian Association, Philadelphia, November 17, 1885. New York, New York: Self-published. 1885. OCLC 32714945
- Dickinson, Mary Lowe. The Amber Star, and, A Fair Half-dozen. New York, New York: Phillips & Hunt; Cincinnati, Ohio: Cranston & Stowe, 1886. OCLC 17504841
- Dickinson, Mary Lowe. Among the Thorns: A Novel. New York, New York: G. W. Carleton & Co., 1880. OCLC 9495150
- Dickinson, Mary Lowe. From Girlhood to Motherhood. New York, New York: F. H. Revell Co., 1899. OCLC 4507764
- Dickinson, Mary Lowe. From Hollow to Hilltop. Philadelphia, Pennsylvania: American Baptist Publication Society, 1896. OCLC 30543431
- Dickinson, Mary Lowe and Myrta Lockett Avary, eds. Heaven, Home and Happiness (poetry and prose collection). New York, New York: The Christian Herald, 1901. OCLC 3066835
- Dickinson, Mary Lowe. One Little Life. New York, New York: Eaton & Mains; Cincinnati, Ohio: Curts & Jennings, 1890. OCLC 17504847
- Dickinson, Mary Lowe. Onward, Christian Soldiers: An Autographic Year-book and Christian Counsellor for Every Day in the Year ... Also, six separate articles ... by the founders and promoters of the several [Christian] orders. Washington, D.C.: Brodix Publishing Co., c. 1892. OCLC 848566636
- Dickinson, Mary Lowe. Over the Gate. New York, New York: American Tract Society, 1901. OCLC 929915440
- Dickinson, Mary Lowe. Reunion of the pioneers and friends of woman's progress, on the eightieth birthday of Mrs. Elizabeth Cady Stanton, Metropolitan Opera House, New York, Tuesday evening, November 12, 1895. New York, New York: Self-published, 1895. OCLC 23680843
- Dickinson, Mary Lowe. Spring Blossoms: An Easter Story. Philadelphia, Pennsylvania: C.H. Banes, 1895. OCLC 7758626
- Dickinson, Mary Lowe. The Temptation of Katharine Gray (fiction). Philadelphia : A.J. Rowland, 1895. OCLC 9491060
- Dickinson, Mary Lowe. Three Times and Out. New York, New York: Hunt & Eaton, 1895. OCLC 657050963

== Philanthropic and community service efforts ==
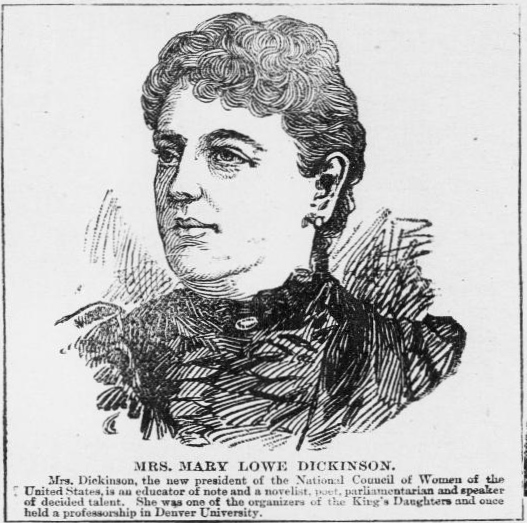
Announcement of Mary Lowe Dickinson's appointment as president, National Council of Women of the United States (Pacific Commercial Advertiser, April 18, 1895).

During the mid-1880s, Mary Lowe Dickinson became active with other prominent women in the planning and launch of a new philanthropic organization, the International Order of the King’s Daughters and Sons. Appointed in 1887 as general secretary – a post which she held for the remainder of her life – she also edited the group's magazine, The Silver Cross, beginning in 1888, and penned the lyrics for the group’s hymn, Lead Now as Forth We Go, which were set to the music of Nearer My God to Thee. Gradually garnering national attention for the organization and for herself in newspapers nationwide, she was invited to speak at the Dansville Water Cure during the late 1800s. According to historian Susan Cayleff, this health spa became known as "Our Home" to many of those who became involved with it as patrons or patients. In addition to serving "as a training ground for women physicians", this facility was propelled to "the center of national reform politics" when James Caleb Jackson assumed leadership – due to his interest in abolition, temperance, women's rights, the cooperative union of labor and capital, and mental therapeutics." Other prominent women and men who lectured or received care here included: Bronson Alcott, Susan B. Anthony, Clara Barton, Frederick Douglass, Elizabeth Cady Stanton, and Sojourner Truth.

After advocating for uniform divorce laws for men and women in the United States in 1892, she was elected president, in 1895, of the National Council of Women of the United States. One of the oldest, nonsectarian women’s organizations in America, NCW was at the forefront, during the late 1890s, of efforts to ensure equal pay for women and reform dress codes. During her tenure as president, she oversaw revisions to the NCW’s constitution and structure, including the division of the organization into an "upper and lower council." During this era, she also issued an appeal (in 1898) for clothing and supplies to relieve "the suffering women and children of Cuba."

Additional service included appointments as secretary of the American Bible Society’s Women’s Branch, national superintendent of the Women’s Christian Temperance Union’s higher education department, and president of the Women’s National Indian Association.

== Anti-war activism ==
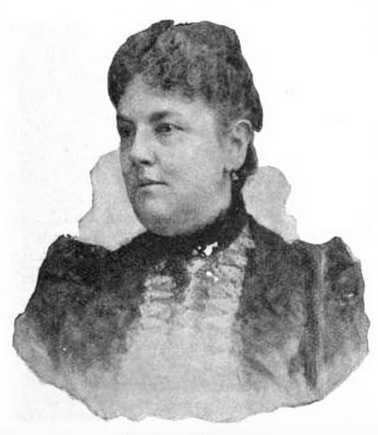
Mary Lowe Dickinson (1895)

Three years before the turn of the century, she co-signed a letter with Maud D. Ballington-Booth (Salvation Army), Mary Louise Beebe, Elizabeth Bacon Custer (the widow of George Armstrong Custer), Grace Hoadley Dodge (Y.W.C.A. and Travelers Aid Society of New York), Mary Mapes Dodge (renowned children’s author), Hannah B. Einstein (National Federation of Temple Sisterhoods and Federation of Jewish Women’s Organizations), Jeannette Leonard Gilder (editor, Scribner’s Monthly and drama and music critic, The New York Herald), Ellen Martin Henrotin (president of the General Federation of Women’s Clubs), Josephine Shaw Lowell (founder, New York Consumer’s League), Alice Freeman Palmer (former president, Wellesley College, and dean of women, University of Chicago), Julia H. Percy, Margaret Elizabeth Sangster (editor, Harper’s Bazaar), Louisa Lee Schuyler (founder, New York State Charities Aid Association), Mary E. Trautman, and Candace Wheeler (founder, the Society of Decorative art in New York, and co-founder, New York Exchange for Women’s Work) to prevent America’s entry into armed conflict. It ran in newspapers on February 10, 1897, and read as follows:

To the Women of the United States: We ask your earnest and prompt cooperation in urging upon the senate of the United States that after full consideration it should ratify the arbitration treaty between this country and Great Britain, and without amendments which will cripple its efficiency. The mothers, the wives and the homes of our land have the deepest interest in the substitution of law for war. In times of conflict they are the keenest sufferers, and while the nation’s honor is dear to them, whatever tends to settle disputes by reason and law, rather than by warfare, demands their heartiest indorsement. It is absolutely necessary that the universal public opinion of the country, in favor of this treaty, should find expression. Therefore, we ask you, without delay, to write personally to your senators, to hold meetings, to send petitions and to aid by all means in your power, the completion of this great act of Christian civilization.

The treaty referred to in this letter was an agreement between Great Britain and Venezuela “to provide for an amicable settlement of the question which has arisen between their respective Governments concerning the boundary between the Colony of British Guiana and the United States of Venezuela.”

== Legal challenges and illness ==
During the opening decade of the new century, Mary Lowe Dickinson suffered another series of financial and legal setbacks, this time resulting from her agreement in 1904 to purchase an expensive set of books due to a mistaken belief that she was creating a sound investment opportunity. Refusing to remit payment after realizing her error, she then fell ill in June 1909 after being harassed and sued by creditors. Newspapers nationwide chronicled the state of her affairs, including The Topeka State Journal, which noted that:

Mrs. Mary Low Dickinson, the venerable authoress and founder of the International Order of Kings Daughters, is quite ill at her home here, it was announced today, following a lawsuit in which a judgment of $10,000 was given against her recently in favor of a Boston publishing house. The friends of Mrs. Dickinson, learning of her illness, because of worry over the lawsuit, took up the matter and as a result a rehearing of the case has been granted by the courts and is scheduled to start on Monday, but it is not likely that Mrs. Dickinson will be able to leave her home then.

According to The Sun of New York:

The plaintiff alleges that Mrs. Dickinson, on November 21, 1904, contracted to purchase from the [Frederick J. Quimby] company a set of the works of Paul de Kock in fifty volumes for $7,500, and that the company was ready to deliver them on December 1 of that year, but that Mrs. Dickinson refused to take them.

In her answer Mrs. Dickinson admits having signed a contract for the books, but alleges that the firm represented to her that it only wished to sell her the books for the use of her name and that it would resell them for her at a good profit before delivery.... The matter was put to her, she says, as an investment, and she signed the contract with that understanding....

The book concern obtained a judgment against Mrs. Dickinson by default last March while she was out of the city. On her return her attorney, Melvin H. Dalberg ... procured the setting aside of the judgment by Justice Guy in Special Term, Part I., and a new trial was ordered.

During the June 16, 1909, deposition process for that new trial and the actual trial itself on June 21 it was revealed that Mary Lowe Dickinson had initially agreed to purchase the company’s $2,500 edition of the books, but had been pressured into changing her order to a substantially more expensive one by a representative of the Quimby Company who had convinced her that she could earn a $500 profit if she re-sold it to “a woman in West Virginia who would ultimately rebuy the books from her,” but that the books had not even been ready for delivery to Dickinson and could not have later been resold because the purported buyer from West Virginia had never existed. As a result, New York Supreme Court Justice James Aloysius O’Gorman dismissed the lawsuit against Dickinson.

== Final years, death and interment ==
By 1910, she was a 71-year-old widow residing at the Manhattan, New York, home of her friend, Kate Bond (aged 75), with whom she served in the International Order of the King’s Daughters and Sons, and Bond’s 70-year-old niece – both of whom were described on that year's federal census as being natives of Maryland who had their own income. Dickinson was described as a magazine editor.

Mary Lowe Dickinson died in June 1914. Following funeral services on June 11 at the Methodist Episcopal Church at 60th Street and Madison Avenue, she was laid to rest during a private interment ceremony at Brooklyn’s Green-Wood Cemetery, where her husband had been buried in 1875.
