= Margaret Ashmore Sudduth =

American educator, editor, temperance advocate (1859–1957)

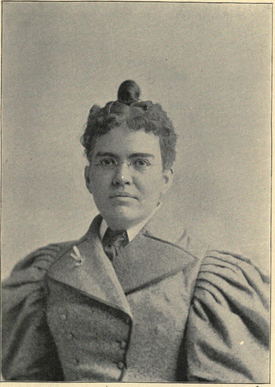
- Photo in Thumb Nail Sketches of White Ribbon Women, 1895
- Born: Margaret Ashmore; June 29, 1859; Mason County, Illinois, U.S.
- Died: September 21, 1957 (aged 98); Los Angeles County, California, U.S.
- Resting place: Olivewood Memorial Park, Riverside, California, U.S.
- Education: Illinois Wesleyan University, Wellesley College
- Occupations: educator, editor, temperance advocate

Margaret Ashmore Sudduth (June 29, 1859 – September 21, 1957) was an American educator, editor, and temperance advocate. She was the senior editor upon the staff of the Woman's Temperance Publishing Association, overseeing The Union Signal. Sudduth was called in July 1887 to a position as editor of Oak and Ivy Leaf, organ of the Young Woman's Christian Temperance Union (YWCTU), and soon became associate editor of The Union Signal also. In 1892, on her appointment as managing editor of The Union Signal, she resigned her connection with the young woman's paper.

== Early life and education ==
Margaret Ashmore Sudduth was born on a farm in Mason County, Illinois, June 29, 1959. Her parents were Dr. James McCreary Sudduth (1827–1895) and Amanda Elizabeth Sudduth (1828–1898). She had two siblings, a brother, Dr. William Xavier Sudduth, and a sister, Alice Sudduth Byerly. Her father had built up an extensive practice in Central Illinois before giving up the practice of medicine to become a banker and stock raiser.

Sudduth received a B.S. degree in 1880 from Illinois Wesleyan University. In the fall of 1881, she entered Wellesley College for a teacher's special course of literature and history, where she remained but a few months, being compelled to give up study on account of failing eyesight.

== Career ==
During the year 1880, she was assistant principal of the high school at Dwight, Illinois. Having traveled extensively with members of her family in the South and West, she went abroad in May, 1886, and spent fourteen months in Europe, traveling through England, Germany, Austria, Italy, and Switzerland, making special study of the German language.

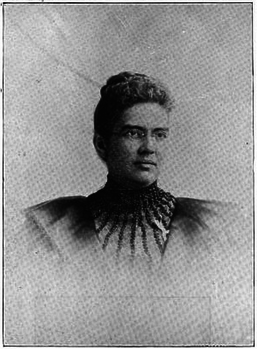
Margaret A. Sudduth

Interested since before her graduation in the temperance movement, she spent considerable time while abroad in investigating the cause of drunkenness in the countries visited, and as a special correspondent to Bloomington, Illinois papers and the Union Signal, she displayed literary ability. In 1887, upon her return to the United States, she accepted the editorship of the Oak and Ivy Leaf, a publication projected by Mary Allen West. In 1890, her name first appeared as an editor of The Union Signal. In January 1892, she assumed the managing editorship.

== Death ==
Margaret Ashmore Sudduth died in Los Angeles County, California, September 21, 1957, and was buried at Olivewood Memorial Park, Riverside, California.
