= Mary Wood Swift =

American suffragist and clubwoman

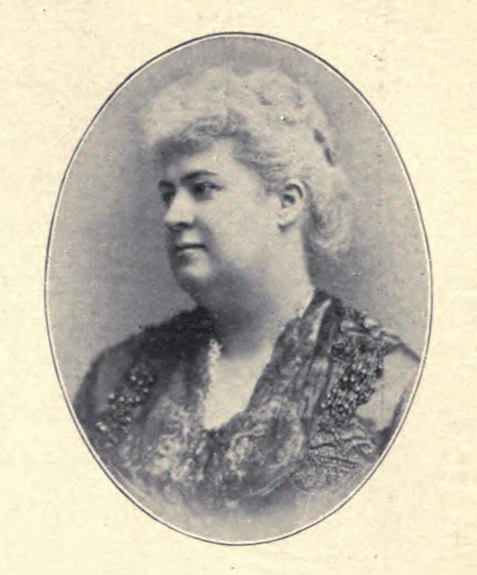
- Mary Wood Swift, 1902.
- Born: Mary Angeline Wood; September 12, 1841; New York, U.S.
- Died: April 8, 1927 (aged 85); Berkeley, California, U.S.
- Occupation: Suffragist
- Spouse: John Franklin Swift

Mary Wood Swift (September 12, 1841 – April 8, 1927) was an American suffragist and clubwoman, president of the National Council of Women of the United States from 1903 to 1909.

== Early life ==
Mary Angeline Wood was born in New York, the daughter of William Graham Wood and Emily Morrell Wood.

== Career ==
Swift was president of the National Council of Women of the United States from 1903 to 1909. In that role, she led national meetings, and she attended International Council of Women meetings, including the 1904 executive meeting in Dresden, the full congress meeting in Berlin, along with Ida Husted Harper, and in 1909 in Toronto.

Swift was president of the Century Club in San Francisco. She was also active in the Women's Relief Corps the California Women's Suffrage Association, the Colonial Dames of America, the Society of the Mayflower, and the national Daughters of the American Revolution. "The Society of the Daughters of the American Revolution should not be devoted to ancestor-worship and to preserving history," she told the organization in a speech in 1906, "but it should bend its energies also to making history and to creating better conditions for posterity." In the same speech, she expressed opposition to immigration into the United States, and her support for Americanization and literacy programs.

== Personal life ==
Mary Wood married American diplomat John Franklin Swift. They lived in San Francisco but were often abroad for Swift's work, until he died in Tokyo in 1891. She was left with a significant fortune in widowhood. After the 1906 San Francisco earthquake, she moved to Berkeley, California. She died in 1927, in Berkeley, aged 86 years.
