= Mary Bonney =

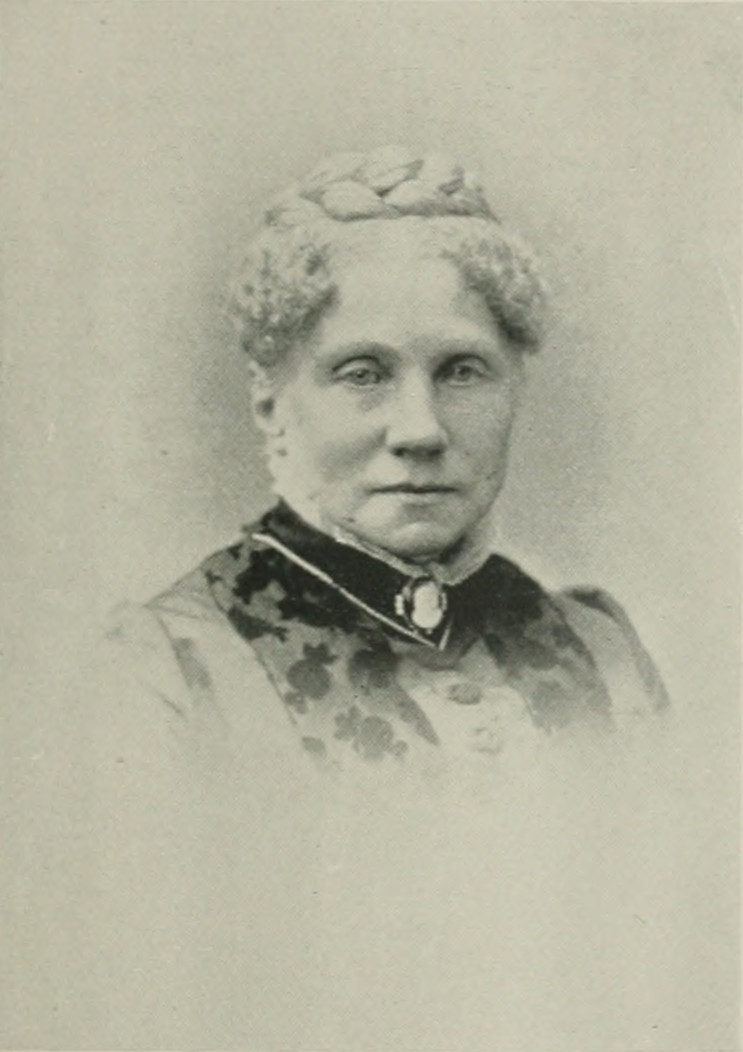
Mary Lucinda Bonney Rambaut, A woman of the century

Mary Lucinda Bonney (after marriage, Mary Lucinda Bonney Rambaut; June 8, 1816 – July 24, 1900) born in Hamilton, New York, was a 19th-century American educator and advocate for Native American rights. She is considered to be the most important woman in the Native American movement to protect their tribal lands. She was also involved in the early movement to provide for girls' education. With fellow teacher Harriette A. Dillaye, in 1850 she founded a female seminary in Philadelphia. It became known as the Ogontz School for Young Ladies after it moved to a suburban estate of that name. After a second move, the last campus was developed after 1950 as Penn State Abington.

In collaboration with Amelia Stone Quinton, Bonney founded the Women's National Indian Association, which worked initially to defend Native American land rights against settler encroachment. They eventually supported assimilation of Native Americans to the majority culture, including support for the Dawes Act of 1887. This proposed allotment of lands in Indian Territory to individual Indian households, the end of tribal governments, and support for the tribes to take up subsistence farming.

== Early life and education ==
Mary Bonney was the fourth child of six in her family, who were devoted Baptists. Her parents were Benjamin and Lucinda (Wilder) Bonney. She was the granddaughter of Benjamin Bonney and of Abel Wilder, both of Chesterfield, Massachusetts, and both soldiers in the American Revolutionary War.

After her parents started her education at Ladies Academy in Hamilton, New York, she transferred to the Emma Willard School in Troy. Here she found a classical curriculum that was nearly identical to that provided in men's colleges. After two years at Emma Willard School, Bonney graduated in 1835 and began her teaching career.

She taught in a variety of cities and states, ranging from Jersey City and other places in New Jersey, New York City, South Carolina, Providence, Rhode Island; and Philadelphia, among others. She first taught in New Jersey. Next she moved to New York City, where she became the principal of academy in De Ruyter, before she took a temporary teaching spot at her alma mater. In 1842 she moved to the South in order to be in charge of a girls' school in Beaufort, South Carolina. After six years, she returned to the North, teaching in Providence, Rhode Island. A year later she moved to Philadelphia to take another teaching position.

== Ogontz School for Young Ladies ==
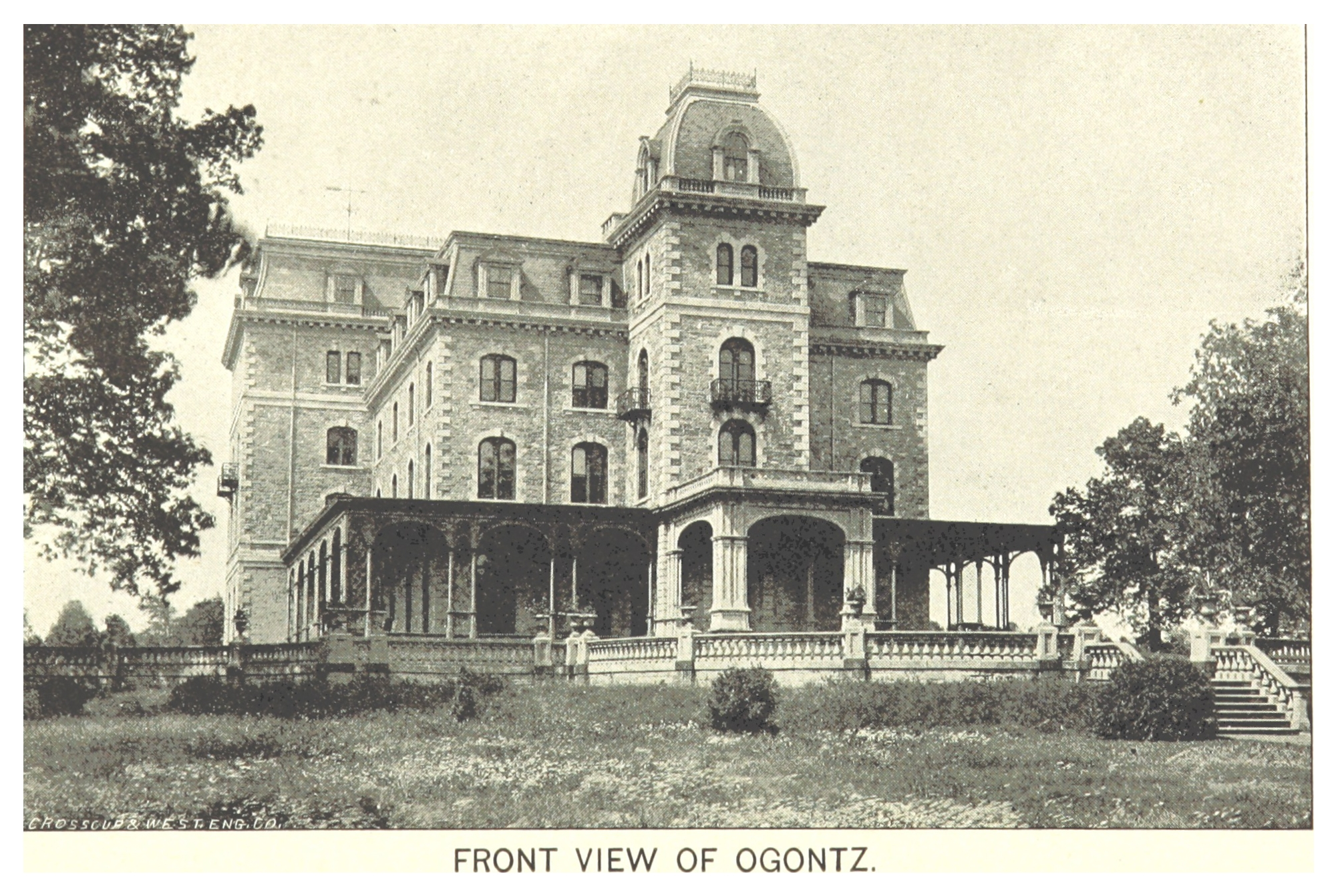
Ogontz School for Young Ladies (1892)

In 1850, Bonney wanted to provide her widowed mother a house. She co-founded the Chestnut Street Female Seminary in Philadelphia, with Harriette A. Dillaye, a fellow teacher at Troy Female Seminary (Emma Willard School). As the school prospered, its student body expanded.

To accommodate the growth, in 1883 Bonney leased the Ogontz Estate, former home of banker Jay Cooke, in suburban Cheltenham Township, Pennsylvania, for $15,000 annually. This enabled Cooke to recover from financial setbacks in that period.

The school was renamed as Ogontz School for Young Ladies after the estate. The school offered girls, ages 13 through 18, (both boarders and day students) a liberal art education, which included science, humanities, and physical education. As the school became more successful, it needed more space.

Ownership changed hands and, in 1916 owner and president, Abby A. Sutherland, purchased a 54-acre plot for the school in Rydal, Pennsylvania, in Abington Township about eight miles from Philadelphia. After operating the school for several more decades, in 1950 she donated this facility to Pennsylvania State University. The campus was developed as Penn State Abington, classified in 1997 as one of several colleges in the commonwealth system.

== Activist ==
In 1878 Congress proposed to take away land reserved under treaties to tribes that had been removed to Indian Territory. Bonney was outraged and started a petition in opposition. She decided to ask for help from her missionary circle. With their help, she started a campaign that collected about 13,000 signatures. The petition was presented to President Rutherford B. Hayes and Congress. They organized signatures for a second petition, with 50,000 signatures and presented it in 1881 to the Senate through Senator Henry L. Dawes (R-Massachusetts), sponsor of the act that bears his name.

That same year Bonney and leading followers decided to form an association. They called themselves Indian Treaty-Keeping and Protective Association, and Bonney was elected as president. In 1882 they presented the government with a third petition, numbering nearly 100,000 signatures. These were in support of a proposal to grant tribal lands to Native Americans.

== Marriage and death ==
After Bonney resigned from the presidency in November 1884, she reduced her role in the Association. But she always supported these causes financially.

In 1888, she married Reverend Thomas Rambaut, whom she had met 40 years before while teaching in Robertville, South Carolina. In 1888, both took part in the World's Missionary Convention in London and married there.

After the couple returned to the US, they settled in Bonney's hometown of Hamilton, New York. Reverend Rambaut died on October 15, 1890. The widowed Bonney moved in with her brother in Hamilton. She died in 1900.
