= M. Louise Thomas (social leader) =

American feminist and clubwoman (1822–1907)

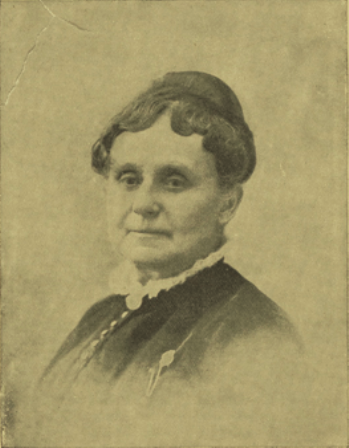
- Born: Maria Louise Palmer; May 14, 1822; Mount Holly, New Jersey, U.S.
- Died: February 14, 1907 (aged 84); New York City, New York, U.S.
- Resting place: Laurel Hill Cemetery, Philadelphia, Pennsylvania, U.S.
- Occupation: social leader
- Spouse: Abel Charles Thomas (m. 1843; died 1880)
- Children: 2 sons

Signature
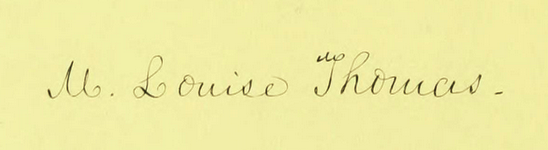

M. Louise Thomas (née Palmer; May 14, 1822 – February 14, 1907) was an American feminist and clubwoman. She founded the American Woman's Sanitary Association during the American Civil War. She served as president of the Woman's Centenary Association of the Universalist Church (WCA), as the fourth president of Sorosis, and as the treasurer of the National Council of Women.

== Biography ==
Maria Louise Palmer was born on May 14, 1822, in Mount Holly, New Jersey, during the temporary residence there of her parents, both of whom were natives of Pottsville, Pennsylvania. Her father, Judge Strong W. Palmer, was of Puritan descent, being on his mother's side a lineal descendant of Gov. William Bradford and Rev. John Robinson, the pastor of the Mayflower; and on that of his father, of Myles Standish.

In 1843, she married Rev. Abel Charles Thomas, a Universalist minister. She was interested in the religious training of youth and involved in the different aid societies associated with the church. They lived in Brooklyn, New York; Cincinnati, Ohio; and Philadelphia, Pennsylvania, where for 15 years, she worked in the church.

She and the children accompanied Rev. Thomas in an 18 month tour through Great Britain and Europe. Her written descriptions of her travels were published and widely circulated.

During the American Civil War, Philadelphia became a busy center for the North including for the treatment of injured soldiers. Thomas helped organize the Woman's Sanitary Association, to nurse and care for sick and injured soldiers. She saw the need to help soldiers communicate with family in their distant homes. She organized a system of correspondence with friends, and of personal visitations to the sick and wounded, during which she wrote thousands of letters.

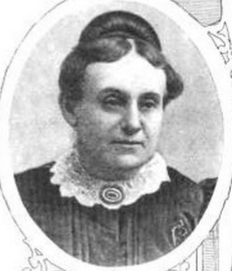
Image of Thomas from The History of the Women's Club Movement in America

At the end of the war, Thomas was in poor health from the strain of overwork, and her husband had also been in poor health for several years. They decided to seek rest in the country. In the Spring of 1864, they moved to Hightstown, New Jersey, a thriving farming neighborhood, with a Universalist Church. Thomas had not previously spent time on a farm, or in the country. She took to farming including the propagation of beds and nursling fruit trees, and the study of soils and fertilizers.

Their next home was in Bridgeport, Connecticut, where they spent two years.

In 1867, they purchased a 20 acres (8.1 ha) farm which was the former estate of Thomas Lloyd Wharton in Tacony, Philadelphia. Thomas had sole direction and management of all the farming operations, and demonstrated that a woman could be a successful agriculturist. She was closely involved with the details of field, garden, woodland and dairy work, and her crops of wheat, rye, oats, corn and hay were equal to neighboring farms. She also managed a small herd of Alderney cattle and raised Brahma chicken.

She was close friends of Abraham Lincoln, Edwin Stanton, P. T. Barnum, and Susan B. Anthony. Thomas conceived of the idea for a library for the growing community of Tacony (which endures today as the Tacony branch of the Free Library of Philadelphia). She served as secretary of the National Council of Women while Susan B. Anthony was vice-president. Thomas brought up and educated a large number of boys and girls, mostly orphans of various nationalities. Some of them were helpers on her farm.

In religion, Thomas was a Universalist. For six years, she was the secretary of the Pennsylvania Universalist Convention. She was an active member of the WCA. She was elected vice president for Pennsylvania at its organization in Buffalo, New York, in September, 1869, and retained that office eleven years, when she gave it up to become the organization's second president. In 1871, she was one of a committee of three, appointed to submit a constitution for its re-organization, and in 1873, she became one of its incorporators for National Work in the District of Columbia. She also had the exclusive charge of the publication of tracts and books for the WCA, the only organized Tract Society of the Universalist Church.

In 1880, a month after she was widowed, Thomas was elected to the office of president of the WCA. She served as president of the women's club Sorosis, from 1886 to 1889. She served as vice-president of the Medico-Legal Society of New York, judge of the Silk Culture Association of Philadelphia, and director of the Bee-keepers' Association. Her house in Tacony contained rare old books and manuscripts. Her library numbered between 3,000 and 4,000 books. She maintained a collection of antique coins, engravings, old manuscripts and autographs.

In 1892, in response to the Russian famine of 1891–1892, the U.S. Government appointed her, along with Dr. De Witt Talmage, to travel to Russia and investigate the conditions. She spent several months abroad and personally supervised the distribution of food and clothing.

Thomas died of heart failure in New York City on February 14, 1907, and was interred in Laurel Hill Cemetery in Philadelphia.

== Publication ==
- Centenary Voices; or A Part of the Work of Women of the Universalist Church from Its Centenary Year to the Present Time., Philadelphia: Women's Centenary Association, 1886
