= Josefa Humpalová–Zeman =

Czech-American journalist and feminist

Josefa Veronika Humpalová–Zeman
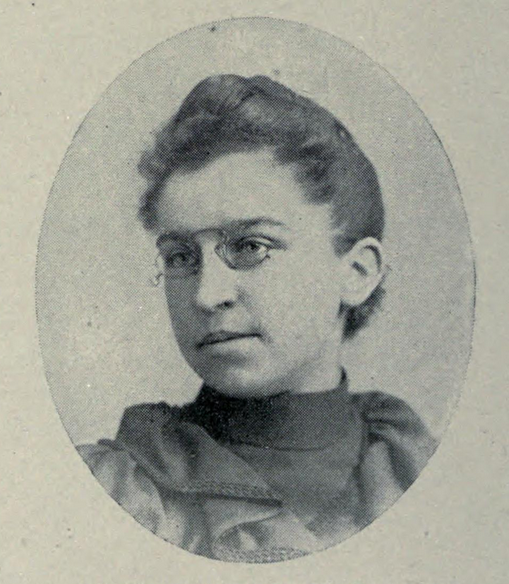
- Humpalová–Zeman in 1894
- Born: Josefa Veronika Humpalová; January 9, 1870; Sušice, Bohemia, Austria-Hungary
- Died: April 23, 1906 (aged 36); Prague, Bohemia, Austria-Hungary
- Burial place: Olšany Cemetery, Prague
- Education: College for Women of the Western Reserve; University of Chicago
- Occupations: Czech-American journalist, newspaper founder, feminist and suffragist
- Organization(s): Unity of Czech Ladies; National Council of Women of the United States; Czech Committee for Preparation Works of Czech Women at the World's Columbian Exposition; Slavic Journalists
- Known for: Founding the newspapers Ženské Listy in America and Šťastný domov in Austria-Hungary
- Spouse: Robert Zeman (m. 1887, div. 1888)

Josefa Veronika Humpalová–Zeman (January 9, 1870 – April 23, 1906) was a Czech-American journalist, newspaper founder, feminist and suffragist.

== Biography ==
Humpalová–Zeman was born on January 9, 1870 in Sušice, Bohemia, Austria-Hungary. When she was aged 2, she emigrated to the United States with her family. She married Robert Zeman on June 30, 1887 in Chicago, Illinois. They were divorced the following year.

In 1889, Humpalová–Zeman enrolled at the College for Women of the Western Reserve (CWRU, later the Flora Stone Mather College) in Cleveland, Ohio.

In the early 1890s, Humpalová–Zeman joined the Unity of Czech Ladies and was known as a spirited debater. She was also a member of the National Council of Women of the United States.

In 1892, Humpalová–Zeman was appointed as Secretary for the "Committee for Preparation Works of Czech Women" at the 1893 World's Columbian Exposition. As the Bohemian delegate to the exposition, she gave an address on the topic of women as social leaders and "took advantage of the exposition" to "promulgate... linguistic nationalism" and promote "new women's initiatives."

In 1893, Humpalová–Zeman enrolled at the University of Chicago.

In 1894, Humpalová–Zeman founded the newspaper Ženské Listy (Woman's Gazette) in Chicago. It was the first publication for Czech women in the United States, as well as the first Bohemian newspaper anywhere in the world. She served as editor and general manager of the newspaper. She was also appointed Executive Secretary of the Slavic Journalists in 1897.

Humpalová–Zeman resigned from Ženské Listy in 1901. She moved to Prague, where she founded the newspaper Šťastný domov (Happy Home) in 1904.

Humpalová–Zeman died on April 23, 1906, aged 36, in Prague, Austria-Hungary. She was buried in Olšany Cemetery.
