= Jennie Drinkwater Conklin =

American author

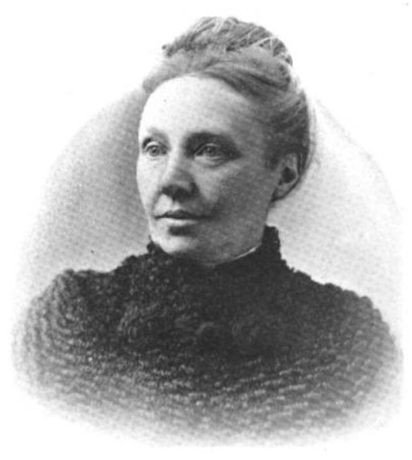
- Born: Jennie Maria Drinkwater; April 14, 1841; Portland, Maine, U.S.
- Died: April 28, 1900 (aged 59); New Vernon, New Jersey, U.S.
- Resting place: Hillside Cemetery, Madison, New Jersey, U.S.
- Education: Greenleaf Female Institute
- Occupations: author; social activist
- Spouse: Nathaniel Conklin (m. 1880; died 1892)
- Writing career
- Language: English
- Genres: children's literature; correspondence

Jennie Maria Conklin (née Drinkwater; pen name, Mrs. Nathaniel Conklin; April 14, 1841 – April 28, 1900) was a 19th-century American author and social activist. While still in her teens, she became known for her stories for children. She wrote books for girls as well as for the religious press. Conklin was the originator of the organization known as the Shut-in Society, which was a bureau of correspondence for disabled women and girls.

== Early life and education ==
Jennie Maria Drinkwater was born in Portland, Maine, April 14, 1841. Her father was Levi Drinkwater, a retired sea captain. She was educated in the public schools there and at the Institution for Young Ladies on Brooklyn Heights, also known as the Greenleaf Female Institute.

== Career ==
Drinkwater began writing as a child, and was a constant contributor to leading papers. Always fond of reading, at the age of 12, she became inspired with the thought of writing a book herself. At odd moments, she made her first attempt at story-writing, story-telling she had begun before, gathering about her the younger children to listen to the adventures of some small heroine. Her earliest recollection of books were the Bible and The Pilgrim's Progress. Later, she looked back and saw how the thread of those early influences wove her stories. Having had from her earliest reading an absorbing interest in biography, one of her first inspirations in bookmaking was the thought of biography—to write lives of people as she found them, using their weaknesses, hardships, evil or noble conduct to point truth to others. For this reason, Conklin's stories always possessed a moral as well as an absorbing interest.

In 1874, when she was disabled, she became interested in girls and women shut in from the outside world, and the thought of a society for mutual comfort occurred to her. She sought other disabled women in similar circumstances, and wrote an account of her Shut-In Society. By 1896, the Shut-In Society had more than 2,000 members, with members in every state, and in many other parts of the world. It was an organized society, with an advisory board, and it published monthly a magazine call the Open Window. Her book, Tessa Wadsworth's Discipline, gives a sketch of its earliest members.

Under her maiden name, she wrote a number of books, among the better known being Tessa Wadsworth's Discipline, Bek's First Corner, Marigold, Dolly French's Household, Miss Prudence, and Fifteen. Other popular books included Other Folk, Rue's Helps, The Story of Hannah, Isabel's Between Times, Rizpah's Heritage, From Flax to Linen, Three Women, Three and Twenty, Paul French's Way, Electa, Uncle Justice Seth's Will, The Fairfax Girls, Second Best, Set Free, Fourfold, Marigold, Other Folk, Miss Prudence Cromwell, The Story of Hannah, Looking Seaward, Dorothy's Islands, Goldenrod Farm, Shar Burbank. Her books were financially successful; several editions of 30,000 each were sold. Her books were classified as "Sunday-school Juveniles" for the young, but more especially for girls.

== Personal life ==
She married Rev. Nathaniel Conklin, March 17, 1880. He was for many years pastor of the Presbyterian Church of New Vernon, New Jersey. He died in 1892.

After her husband's death, she resided in Newark, New Jersey. She died in New Vernon, New Jersey, on April 28, 1900, aged 59. Interment was made in Hillside Cemetery.

== Selected works ==
- Tessa Wadsworth's Discipline
- Other Folk, Rue's Helps
- Bek's First Corner
- Miss Prudence
- The Story of Hannah
- Isabel's Between Times
- Rizpah's Heritage
- From Flax to Linen
- Marigold
- Three Women
- Three and Twenty
- Paul French's Way
- Electa
- Fifteen
- Uncle Justice Seth's Will
- The Fairfax Girls
- Second Best
- Set Free
- Fourfold
- Marigold
- Other Folk
- Miss Prudence Cromwell
- The Story of Hannah
- Looking Seaward
- Dorothy's Islands
- Goldenrod Farm
- Shar Burbank
- Dolly French's Household
