= Margaret Bottome =

American reformer, author and magazine editor

Margaret McDonald Bottome
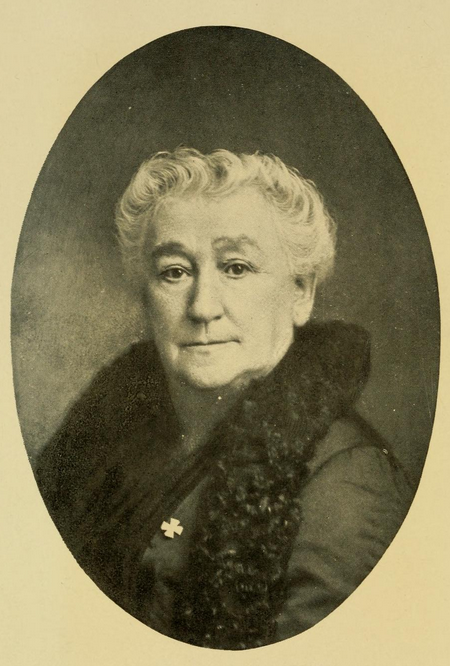
- Born: Margaret McDonald; December 29, 1827; New York City, U.S.
- Died: November 14, 1906 (aged 78); New York City
- Occupations: Reformer, organizational founder, author
- Spouse: Francis Bottome (m. 1850; died 1878)
- Children: 4

Signature
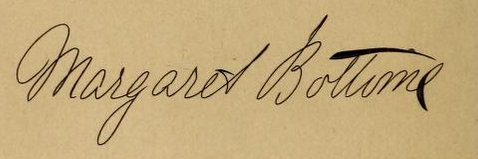

Margaret Bottome (née McDonald; December 29, 1827 – November 14, 1906), also known as the author Margaret McDonald Bottome, was an American reformer, organizational founder, and author. She was engaged in religious work in Brooklyn, and for more than a quarter of a century, she gave Bible talks to the society women of New York City. Out of these experiences grew the order of the King's Daughters, which she founded and for which she was annually chosen president until her death. She was the author of several books, and made a large number of contributions to religious magazines.

== Early life and education ==
Margaret McDonald was born in New York City, December 29, 1827. Her parents, William and Mary (Willis) McDonald, were of Scottish ancestry. She was the eldest of 18 siblings. McDonald lived in Brooklyn from her childhood. She received her education at Prof. Greenleaf's School for Girls, Brooklyn Heights.

Early in life, she became interested in religious and charitable work in Brooklyn where her father held a municipal position. She accompanied him weekly to the almshouse and prison, and systematically visited the sick and poor of the Brooklyn districts. Influenced by these impressions, she developed strong religious and charitable sentiments. The influence of the home culminated in the conversion of Margaret at Sand Street Church, at the age of 12.

== Career ==
In 1850, she married Rev. Francis ("Frank") Bottome, an itinerant preacher of the Methodist Episcopal Church. About 1876, she commenced giving Bible talks in drawing-rooms to society women of New York City and continued this practice for more than 25 years. Francis was a native of England, who had served in the local ministry in that country and had migrated to Canada, where on an immense circuit, he preached to the Native Americans until his health declined, after which he came to New York City.

When Rev. Bottome was a pastor in the wealthy suburb of Tarrytown, New York, some of the summer residents heard of the talks Margaret was giving to a class which she led, and they came to listen to her. After that, for more than a quarter of a century, she lectured on the topic of "Bible Talks" in the drawing rooms and salons of wealthy women; it was her most effective personal work. In 1878, Rev. Bottome was thrown from his horse and killed. Instead of his death putting an end to Margaret's activities, it spurred her on to continue in religious work. The couple had four sons. One of them, who became a physician, died young. Two sons became ministers, Rev. W. M. Bottome and Rev. George H. Bottome. The fourth, Harry H. Bottome, became a lawyer.

On January 13, 1886, with nine other women, Bottome organized the first "ten" of the order of the King's Daughters, the name being suggested by Mrs. William Irving, a New York educator, basing the system on Edward Everett Hale's Ten Times One is Ten. Till her death, Bottome was annually chosen president.

In 1896, she was elected and accepted the additional responsibility of the presidency of the Woman's branch of the International Medical Missionary Society. Securing Bottome as president, many other women joined.

Bottome served as associate editor of the Ladies' Home Journal, having regularly contributed since 1889 a department article called "Heart to Heart Talks with the King's Daughters", and she also wrote for various other periodicals, mainly religious publications. Bottome wrote some pamphlets. Among her other published works are Crumbs from the King's Table, A Sunshine Trip to the Orient, Death and Life, and Seven Questions After Easter. Some of Bottome's lectures, her "Bible Talks", were published first in the Silver Cross Magazine, the organ of the King's Daughters, and later in book form, under the title of The Guest Chamber (New York, 1893).

== Death and legacy ==
After being ill for some time, Bottome died at her home in New York City, November 14, 1906, aged 78.

The Margaret Bottome Memorial, The King's Daughter's House in Harlem (incorporated, 1907), was located at 344 East 124th Street, New York City. It focused upon settlement lines in the Upper East Side districts, and maintained a sewing school, clubs, classes, and fresh-air work.

== Selected works ==
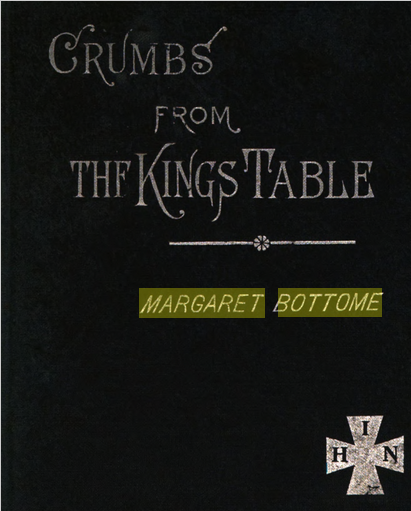
Crumbs From the Kings Table

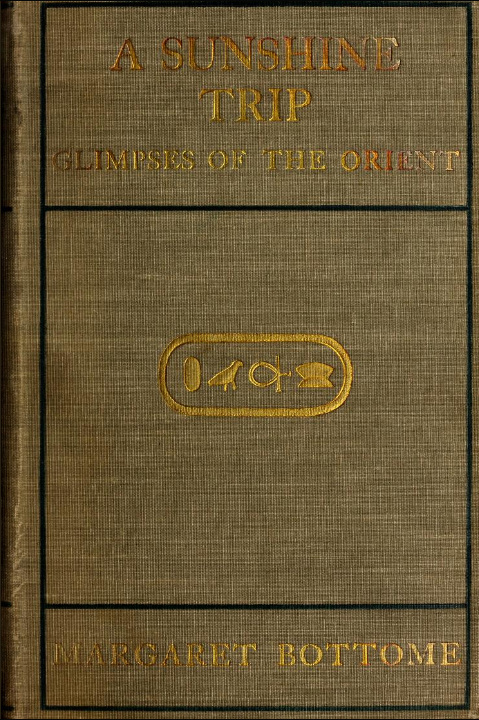
A Sunshine Trip - Glimpses of the Orient

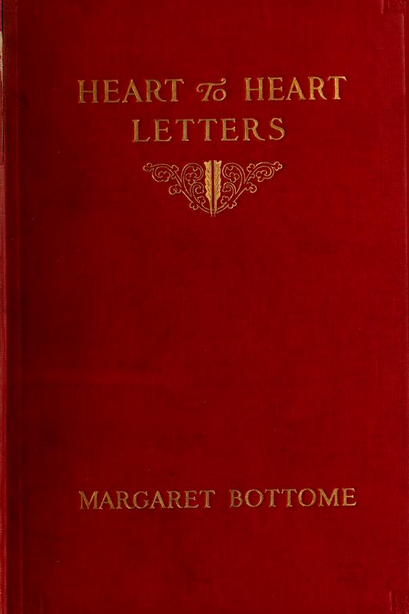
Heart to heart letters

- Death and Life
- Seven Questions After Easter
- The Guest Chamber, 1893
- Crumbs from the King's Table, 1888
- A Sunshine Trip - Glimpses of the Orient, 1897
- Heart to Heart Letters, 1909
