= Eva Perry Moore =

American clubwoman (1852–1931)

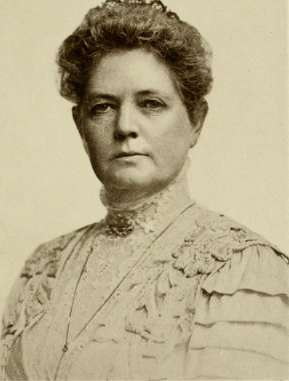
- Eva Perry Moore, Notable women of St. Louis, 1914
- Born: Mary Eva Perry; July 24, 1852; Rockford, Illinois, U.S.
- Died: April 8, 1931 (aged 78); St. Louis, Missouri, U.S.
- Education: Vassar College (BA)
- Spouse: Philip North Moore (m. 1879; died 1930)
- Children: 2

Eva Perry Moore (July 24, 1852 – April 28, 1931) was an American clubwoman based in St. Louis, president of the General Federation of Women's Clubs and the National Council of Women.

== Early life ==
Mary Eva Perry was born in Rockford, Illinois, the daughter of Elizabeth (née Benedict) and Seely Perry. Her father had been a schoolmaster, and in 1858 was elected mayor of Rockford. Perry graduated from Vassar College with a Bachelor of Arts in 1873. She studied abroad from 1876 to 1879.

== Career ==
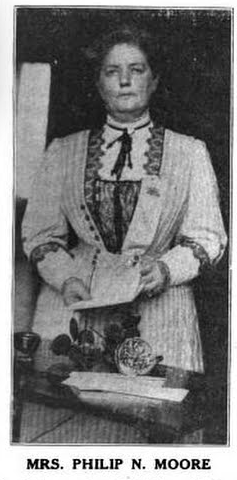
Eva Perry Moore, from a 1910 publication.

Eva Perry Moore was a longtime officer of the General Federation of Women's Clubs, from 1894 to 1912; she was president of the national organization from 1908 to 1912. Before that, she was president of the Missouri Federation of Women's Clubs (1902-1908). Moore became president of the National Council of Women in 1914, and held that office until 1925; she was also vice-president of the International Council of Women from 1920 to 1930. Moore, herself active on behalf of women's suffrage and other progressive reforms, saw the strategic advantage of a national organization of women perceived to be apolitical. "We have no platform unless it is the care of women and children, and the home, the latter meaning the four walls of the city as well as the four walls of brick and mortar," she stated in 1910.

Moore was an alumnae trustee at Vassar College, president of the Nurses' Association of St. Louis, president of the Association of Collegiate Alumnae, president of the Wednesday Club of St. Louis, director of the St. Louis Provident Association, vice-president of the National Conservation Congress, vice-president of the St. Louis School of Philanthropy, founder of the Musical Club of St. Louis, and a member of the Superior Jury of the Louisiana Purchase Exposition (1904).

Moore spoke at the National American Woman Suffrage Association convention when it was held in Baltimore in 1906. In 1909, she traveled with William Howard Taft to the Panama Canal Zone Federation of Women's Clubs meeting. During World War I, she served on the Women's Committee of the Council of National Defense. In 1918, she was appointed to the executive committee of the League to Enforce Peace, along with Anna Howard Shaw, M. Carey Thomas, and Frances Folsom Cleveland Preston.

== Personal life ==
Eva Perry married mining engineer Philip North Moore in 1879. They lived in Colorado and Kentucky, and later moved to St. Louis, Missouri, in 1890. They had two children, Elizabeth Moore and Perry North. Her husband died in 1930. Moore died on April 28, 1931, at her home in St. Louis.
