= Hope Skillman Schary =

American textile designer and business executive

- Born: Hope Skillman c. 1908; Grand Rapids, Michigan, U.S.
- Died: May 23, 1981; New Milford, Connecticut, U.S.
- Education: Goucher College
- Occupations: Textile designer, chief executive
- Known for: Founding Skillmill, Inc.

Hope Skillman Schary (c. 1908 –1981) was an American textile designer and business executive. She founded the textile manufacturing company Skillmill (originally Hope Skillman, Inc.). She was a women's rights leader, heading organizations devoted to women. She served as president of The Fashion Group and the National Council of Women of the United States and as vice president of the International Council of Women.

== Early life and education ==
Hope Skillman was born around 1908 in Grand Rapids, Michigan to Mary Christie and Frederic Cameron Skillman. She grew up in New York City where she attended private and public schools. She attended Goucher College in Maryland where she was a Kappa Alpha Theta sister and a member of the Goucher College Club.

== Career ==
Schary began her career in the fashion industry in New York City in the 1930s. She was an associate editor at Parnassus magazine from 1932 to 1933 and an editor with The Fine Arts magazine from 1933 to 1934. She worked as a creative stylist for the Tabin-Picker Company and was hired as an assistant stylist at the Ameritex division of Cohn-Hall-Marx Co. in 1934. She became a stylist at Cohn-Hall-Marx in 1935 and was director from 1939 to 1942.

Schary was among the first American textile designers, and in 1942 founded her own textile manufacturing company, Hope Skillman Inc. The company, later renamed Skillmill, Inc., designed and produced a line of textiles under her name. Schary was called the "only woman cotton fabric converter in the United States" and was likely the first woman owner of a textile manufacturer. She sold her textiles to stores and designers. For a number of years, even after World War II, her company solely employed women. She served as the company's chief executive until the early 1960s when she retired. In answer to a question regarding how she had settled on her career, she replied that she "needed to become self-sustaining" and wanted to make use of her education and ambition.

== Women's rights movement and retirement ==
Following her retirement from Skillmill in the 1960s, Schary turned her focus to women's rights and led several organizations dedicated to the advancement of women. She was president of Fashion Group, Inc., a fashion industry association for women, from 1958 to 1960 and served on its advisory council. She was president of the National Council of Women of the United States from 1970 to 1972. She served a second term as the council's president from 1976 to 1978. She represented the council on commissions in Washington D.C. and served as the organization's representative to the International Council of Women. She was also a vice president of the International Council of Women.

Schary was a boardmember of the Coalition of National Volunteer Organizations and the National Center for Voluntary Action. She had membership with the Inner Circle in New York City and the Cosmopolitan Club.

== Personal life ==
Schary married painter Saul Schary on December 15, 1934. She lived in New Milford, Connecticut and had a New York residence in Greenwich Village. Her husband died in 1978. Schary died at her New Milford home on May 23, 1981.
