= Jennie Casseday =

American philanthropist

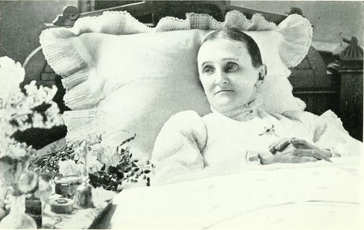
- Photo in A Woman of the Century
- Born: June 9, 1840; Louisville, Kentucky, U.S.
- Died: February 8, 1893 (aged 52); Louisville, Kentucky, U.S.
- Resting place: Cave Hill Cemetery
- Occupations: philanthropist; social reformer; organizational founder; letter writer
- Known for: Flower Mission

Jennie Casseday (June 9, 1840 – February 8, 1893) was a 19th-century American philanthropist, social reformer, school founder, and letter writer. Born in Louisville, Kentucky, in 1840, her girlhood passed amid the surroundings of a wealthy Christian home. In 1861, she was thrown from a carriage; she survived the resulting spinal injury but was physically disabled, and in pain for the rest of her life. It was her own love of flowers in the sick-room which first suggested the Flower Mission. In 1885, she served as superintendent, Flower-mission Department, of the Shut-in Society. When Frances E. Willard came to Louisville in 1881, Cassedy gained Willard's consent to become superintendent of this work for the Woman's Christian Temperance Union (WCTU). From that time until her death, she directed from her sick-bed world-wide plans for this philanthropy, personally conducting an immense correspondence in its interests. Besides her work in the Flower Mission, Casseday was the founder of the Jennie Casseday Infirmary, and the Louisville Training School for Nurses.

== Early life and education ==
Casseday was born in Louisville, Kentucky, June 9, 1840. Her parents were Samuel Casseday (1795–1876) and Eliza McFarland Casseda (1800–1849). She had nine siblings including, Benjamin, S. Addison, Mary, and Fannie.

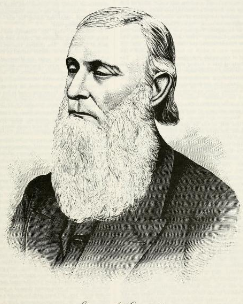
Samuel Casseday

Her father, Samuel, was a Virginian, a Presbyterian, and a slave owner. He was one of the wealthiest men in the city and he was constantly giving away large sums of money to charitable enterprises. He was the eldest son of Peter Casseday, who was killed in the American Revolutionary War. Her mother, Eliza, was born in Philadelphia of Ulster parents and held the British view of slavery. She donated the land on which the Presbyterian orphanage was, as well as a large sum of money with which to begin the building. Eventually, the family's slaves were freed and sent to Liberia paid for by the Cassedays.

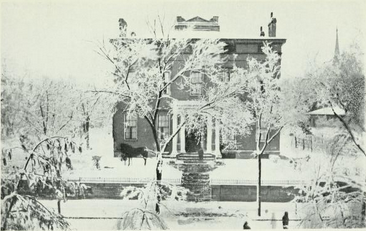
Childhood home

Casseday was born of rich, cultured parents who gave their children everything possible for happiness. As a child, Jennie was so round, ruddy and sturdy that her big brothers called her "Dutch". She kept the family nickname until she was nearly grown. The Casseday home was notable in its day. It stood on the corner of Fourth and Jefferson streets, where the Masonic Temple building was later built. At that time, this part of the city was considered the most fashionable residence quarter. In 1844, Samuel bought an elevated plateau in the center of Louisville and built a big house, providing winter romp-rooms for his daughters and a completely furnished carpenter shop for his son. This provision kept his children at home and also supplied companionship with the boys and girls of his friends.

Eliza, the mother, died in 1849 when Casseday was nine years of age. Immediately after this, Miss Mary Ann McNutt, Eliza's half-sister, took charge of the household, and continued in this role as long as the father lived; afterwards, until her own death, keeping the family together. When Cassedy was well in her teens, Aunt McNutt called her "Miss Gadabout".

Casseday's love for flowers, and for all nature, was an inheritance from her mother. The grounds of the residence were laid off in figures and wide serpentine walks, with trees and flowers. There was a high stone retaining wall with a plantation border which was filled with lilacs, peonies, altheas, weigelias, golden elder, barberry bushes, calacanthus and moss roses. There were broad stretches of bluegrass, ending in circles and squares and half moons of roses.

Just before Casseday graduated from school, she over-exerted her studies, and developed a fever, which continued for months. After that came a period of happiness, including boyfriends, travel, and a social life. In 1861, she was the victim of an accident brought about by runaway horses and an overturned carriage. Her body was dragged along under the wheels, and she was maimed forever.

== Career ==
Casseday kept a diary in which she wrote each night the blessings of the day as they had been experienced by her. Its first page was headed with this quotation: "Count your blessings, one by one." Under it she had written: "I cannot. They rush upon me like waters from a gargoyle."

While Casseday was best known for her Flower Mission work, she was also associated with other public service projects.

Caseseday's second large welfare work was to establish from her bedside an Order of King's Daughters in Louisville. It was a new conception of service at that time— new even in New York where it originated, and wholly unknown in Kentucky or the South. Casseday's sister told her the story of how the Order began, and how its basic motive was TO BE rather than TO DO, the Doing to spring spontaneously out of the Being. Casseday at once had a desire to help this movement. She thought over the personalities of those whom she always depended upon for co-operation in her schemes; and the personality of Jennie Benedict appealed to her as the one best fitted and equipped for the task. Benedict came at Casseday at her call and they conferred over Ways. They were never women to worry over Means. They examined the value of a proposed Christian work, weighed it, planned it out, and then simply expected the Means would arrive. At Casseday's bedside, she, her sister, and Benedict laid the foundations for the work of the King's Daughters in Louisville—a work which soon spread over Kentucky, then all over the Southland.

Casseday was a co-organizer of the Lying-In Hospital for Pregnant Women of Small Means which was established in 1882. She founded a nursing school in Louisville in 1889. The district nurse work owed its establishment to Casseday's philanthropy, an outgrowth of contact with the sick poor through the flower mission. The training school for nurses was successfully operated for several years. In speaking of the training school for nurses, established in Louisville, Casseday says: "It was born in my heart through the ministry of suffering and a longing to help others, as was my connection with the Shut-In Band." The members of the Shut-In Hand consisted of men, women and children who are shut in by disease from the outside world, and of invalids who seldom or never left their rooms or beds. The name was selected from the sixteenth verse of the seventeenth chapter of the Book of Genesis: "And the Lord shut them in." These invalids wrote to one another and had an official organ, the Open Window, which contained letters and news for invalids. This band grew from three members to many thousands, living in all parts of the world. Casseday took much interest in that work and wrote many letters to her invalid friends. Another philanthropy was the opening of Rest Cottage, as a country home for tired girls and women who have to support themselves. There they could obtain good comfortable board at US$1 a week and rest from their worries for a week or two, entertained by Casseday herself.

== Death and legacy ==
Shortly before her death, the King's Daughters established a Jennie Casseday Free Infirmary in Louisville, which was to benefit poor and sick women. She died February 8, 1893, Louisville, and was buried at Cave Hill Cemetery in Louisville.

== Selected works ==
- A letter concerning the ministry of flowers, 1889
- National WCTU, Flower Mission Department., 1889
