= Women's National Indian Association =

American organization concerned with Native Americans

The Women's National Indian Association (WNIA) was founded in 1879 by a group of American women, including educators and activists Mary Bonney and Amelia Stone Quinton. Bonney and Quinton united in the 1880s against the encroachment of white settlers on land set aside for Native Americans in Indian Territory. They drew up a petition that addressed the binding obligation of treaties between the United States and Native American nations. The petition was circulated for signature in sixteen states and was presented to President Rutherford B. Hayes at the White House and in the U.S. House of Representatives in 1880.

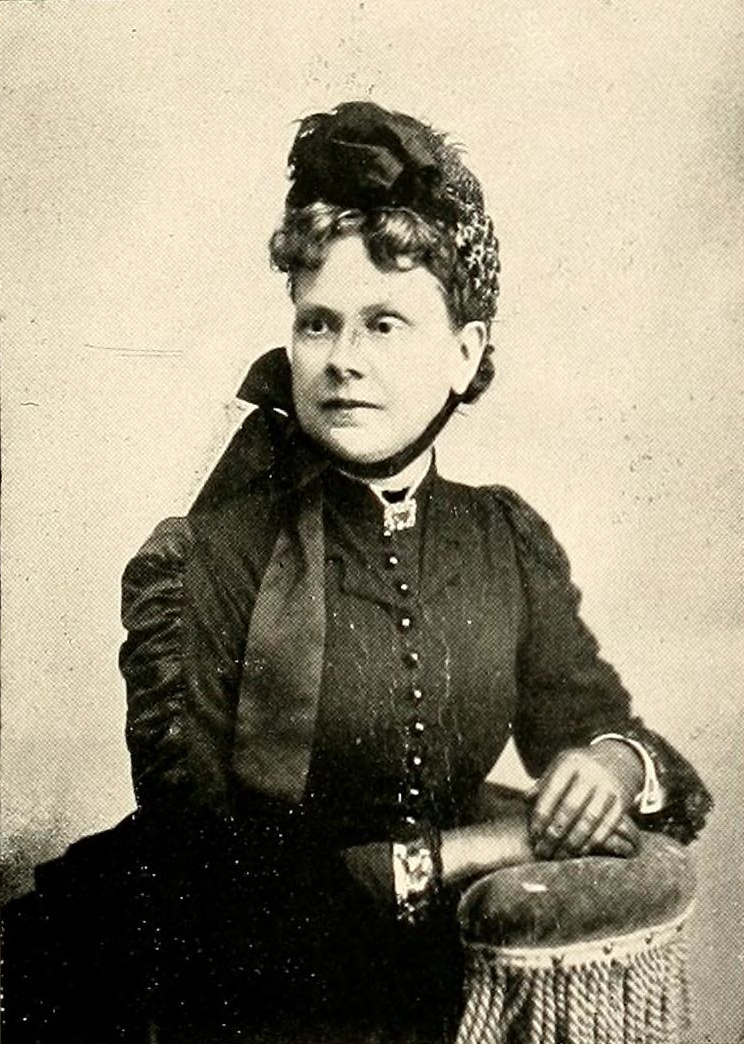
Amelia Stone Quinton (1833-1926)

The Association changed its name to National Indian Association, and was voluntarily dissolved in 1951.

== History ==
Concerned about European-American encroachment on lands reserved for tribes in Indian Territory, Mary Bonney and Amelia Stone Quinton gathered signatures for petitions to demonstrate support among American people to honor the treaties made with tribes by the United States. They submitted the first such petition to the President and Congress in 1880. and Initially The Association first began as a petition drive to persuade Congress to uphold Indian treaties. Initially founded in 1879 in reaction to the prospect of opening Oklahoma Indian Territory to white settlement, additional branches quickly expanded in the 1880s. At its peak the Association supported 98 branch organizations in 28 states and sustained 56 missions on Indian reservations.

The first crusade was a five-year mission devoted to gaining political rights for Indians to vote as United States citizens. Soon, chapters in sixteen states participated in the movement.

In 1882, the male-dominated Indian Rights Association commandeered the lobbying functions of the Association. In response to this, the Association shifted toward a "maternalist" approach and focused on missionary work. The missionary efforts included tasks such as home building, hospital, and educational work on the reservations.

Bonney retired from the presidency of the WNIA in November 1884; she was succeeded by Mary Lowe Dickinson, who was elected to the office. In 1887, Amelia Stone Quinton was unanimously elected president.

The Association underwent several name changes, first named the Central Indian Committee (1879), switching to the Indian Treaty-Keeping and Protective Association (1881-1882), then the Women's National Indian Association (1882-1901). That year they took the name of National Indian Association (1901). The Association was voluntarily dissolved in 1951 due to funding cuts and policy shifts.

== Goals of the movement ==
The Association's aims were to gain assimilation of American Indians into mainstream society, including to encourage their becoming Christian. It maintained missions, produced several publications, and influenced national policy, including the passing of the Dawes Act in 1887. Its main objectives were to assimilate Indians through Christian education and missionary work, and abolish the reservation system.

Quinton described the Association's foundation as a "united effort to move our government to grant a legal status to Indians, the protection of law, lands in severalty, and education." She wrote a pamphlet that criticized the greed of settlers and the unfaithfulness of the United States government toward Indians. Quinton explained the work of the WNIA as "the work of informing the public of the needs, capabilities, and progress of our native Indians, and also it is the work of moving the Government, by direct appeals, to render just to help them."

The WNIA focused on reservation-based communities located west of the Mississippi River. It also supported missions among the Seminole in Florida and the Chiricahua prisoners of war confined in Alabama. During the next decade, the WNIA battled local, state, and federal officials to secure land for them. The WNIA did not believe that the Indian peoples should govern themselves independently but that they should be included in United States mainstream society.

In response to the "maternalist" approach taken by the WNIA, the women tried to teach Native American women about middle-class, European-American practices and roles. They provided materials and resources to enable the women to conform to these "new gendered expectations." Children were taught to read and write in English in mission schools. Mothers were to be taught to make "comfortable and attractive homes" and "cook the foods of civilizations," and both women and children were taught "redeeming Christian truths."

== Legislative influence ==
The Association supported passage of the Dawes Act in 1887. This provided for the allotment of communal reservation land to individual households of tribal members, in order to extinguish Indian land rights in Indian Territory. This was required in order for the territory, together with Oklahoma Territory, to be admitted as a state. In addition, giving households individual plots of land to farm was seen as key to producing subsistence farmers. The Act also granted Indians US (and state) citizenship. It would enable them to vote, but also made them subject to state and federal taxes.

While many of the Association's members considered the Dawes Act an achievement, they did not realize the adverse effects it would have for many Indians. During the subsequent decades, the Five Civilized Tribes lost 90 million acres of former communal lands, which were sold to non-Natives. Many Indians were unfamiliar with land ownership and were targeted by criminals, losing their already small plots of land. Furthermore, the Dawes Act complicated the social structures of the tribes and contributed to their decline in later years.
