= Shut-in Society =

International non-denominational letter-writing social service organization

Shut-in Society was an international non-denominational social service organization working through established channels to unite the sick and well through letter writing. The idea originated with Jennie Drinkwater in 1877 who sought to foster cheer and comfort to those who were chronically incapacitated. Originally regarded as "an organization without organization", in 1884, it organized in New York City and incorporated the following year. By 1902, the work had expanded with 102 wheelchairs in use by members of the society, and hundreds of distributed books, magazines, and newspapers. By 1958, the Shut-in Society was located in 40 states, Canada, England, and Australia.

== Inception ==
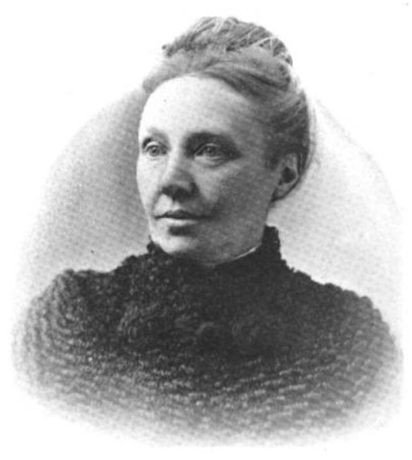
Jennie Drinkwater Conklin, founder

For three years, Drinkwater, of New Vernon, New Jersey, was incapacitated, which resulted in her being shut-in from the world. She craved companionship beyond her one similarly-incapacitated pen pal, Susie Hewett, of Belleville, New Jersey. In January 1877, Drinkwater perused an issue of the Advocate and Garden, a semi-monthly paper issued by the American Female Guardian Society and Home for the Friendless, of New York City, and read an article entitled, "My Invalid Friends", written by "Cousin Alice". Drinkwater quickly corresponded with the writer, Alice M. Ball of Pittsfield, Massachusetts, and the group then numbered three. A second article, "To Invalids" called out by that of Ball, added Mrs. L. J. Green to the circle. One by one, others were added. In the fall of 1879, about three years after the four women were linked together, a manual was issued containing the names and addresses of all the members. The objects of the associated were stated in this printed manual:—

To relieve the weariness of the sick-room by sending and receiving letters and other tokens of remembrance. To testify to the love and presence of Christ in the homes of suffering and privation. To pray for one another at stated times daily, at the twilight hour, and weekly, at ten o'clock on Tuesday mornings. To stimulate faith, hope, patience, and courage to fellow sufferers by the study and presentation of the Bible promises.

The manual continued to be sent out on its mission of sympathy and greeting every three months, until January 1883. In that month, a "Circular Letter" was developed, "embracing, in addition to the names and addresses of the membership, communications from various members, notices of deaths, removals, and withdrawals because of recovery, was sent to each member".

The society was described it as "an organization without organization", and that it had no officers, constitution, by-laws, or initiation fees. The Circular Letter was superseded by an organ, Shut-In Visitor, edited by Kate Sumner Burr, and published at Walworth, New York.

== Early history ==
The Shut-in Society was organized in 1884 on 34th Street in New York City.

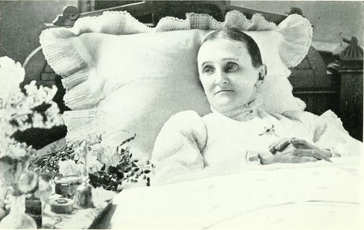
Jennie Casseday, superintendent, Flower Mission Department

After incorporation in 1885, Helen E. Brown, who had acted as president and head of the association since its inception, did not continue in the role. In that year, members were located in every part of the U.S., England, and Canada. The meeting of January 1885 was held in New York City. Represented cities included New York, Brooklyn, and Philadelphia while letters were received from more distant associates. The Board stood as: Drinkwater (now Mrs. Conklin), president; E. E. Burge, secretary and treasurer; May S. Dickinson, editor, Open Window; Annie E. Fuller, librarian; E. Proudfit, superintendent, Missionary Department; Jennie Casseday, superintendent, Flower Mission Department; Mr. W. C. Mather, superintendent, Men's Department. The members of the Helping Hand Committee were M. E. Sangster, Hester Bates, and M. Hitchen. The Shut-in Visitor continued to be published by Burr.

By 1886, a circulating library was established for the lending of books

== Administration ==
The society held annual meetings. Special work was conducted by Branches and standing committees. Some branches maintained exchanges for the display and sale of articles made by incapacitated members who were not afflicted with contagious diseases.

The chronically incapacitated who were shut in from the outside world by physical disability could, upon application, be enrolled as "Shut-in members". Persons interested in the Society's work, who were willing to assist in it by writing letters to shut-ins and calling on them, and otherwise giving service, could become associate members. No Shut-in member could apply to the members of the Society for money, nor could any member urge upon another any particular belief or creed. The society was supported by contributions and by annual membership dues.

National committees and departments conducted special work. The Wheelchair Committee supplied wheel chairs, back-rests, book-rests, lifters, tables, trays, invalid beds, and crutches to those members who were in need of such articles. The Helping Hand Committee supplied members with hot-water bags, rubber air cushions, stationery, stamps, and material for hand work. The Young Men's and Boys' Department addressed postal cards weekly to young men and boy members, and sent them gifts on their birthdays and on Christmas, and picture books and reading matter from time to time. The Young Women's and Girls' Department conducted similar work for young women and girl members. The Library Committee lent books and magazines to members. In addition, the Society had "The Invalids' Auxiliary", a branch of the Woman's Union Foreign Missionary Society, and a "Fund for India", which supported a lady missionary in Bombay.

The association's Central office published an Annual Report.

Both the shut-ins and the associate members wore a little pin on which was engraved the initials of the society, and these stood for "Sympathy, Integrity, Simplicity".

== Official organ ==
The Shut-In Visitor was started in Walworth, New York in January 1883, by Kate Sumner Burr. In January 1885, the name was changed to The Invalid's Visitor. It was an octavo of sixteen pages, monthly, and devoted to the interests of those who were incapacitated, providing specimens of letters which passed between members.

After incorporation in 1885, The Open Window, a monthly magazine, came under the direction of the Advisory Board. Its subscription was US$0.50 a year. On its cream-tinted cover were these words: "A window shalt thou make to the ark." "And the lord shut him in." In 1921, the subscription rate for The Open Window was US$0.10 a year to incapacitated members, US$0.25 a year to associate members, and US$1 a year to subscribing members.
