= Mary F. Eastman =

American educator, lecturer, writer, suffragist

Mary Frances Eastman
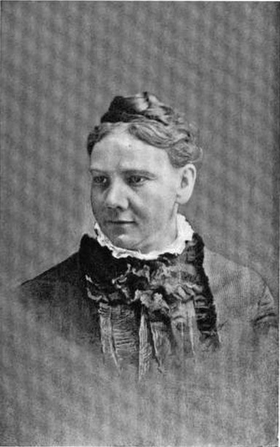
- Photo in Representative Women of New England, 1904
- Born: October 20, 1833; Lowell, Massachusetts, U.S.
- Died: November 1, 1908 (aged 75); Tewksbury, Massachusetts
- Education: Lowell High School
- Occupations: educator; lecturer; writer; suffragist

Mary F. Eastman (October 20, 1833 - November 1, 1908) was an American educator, lecturer, writer, and suffragist of the long nineteenth century. A native of Lowell, Massachusetts, she resided in Tewksbury for many years. She taught in the high and normal school for girls in Boston, and was among the first to be thought competent to teach and control the students of a winter school in Lowell. Her later teaching was in Boston's Charlestown neighborhood and also Somerville. At the request of Horace Mann, she went to Ohio to aid in the work of education which he had undertaken at Antioch College. Eastman thought that suffrage was the highway to all other reforms. She is remembered for her expertise in the lecture-field of women's rights.

== Early life and education ==
Mary Frances Eastman was born in Lowell, Massachusetts. She was the third child of Gardner Kimball Eastman and Mary Flanders Eastman. Two brothers died in childhood. Mary and her younger sister, Helen Eastman (d. 1902), were lifelong companions. The Eastman and Flanders families, from which Eastman descended, were both of English origin. Their early representatives in the U.S. were among the pioneers who settled at Salisbury, Massachusetts, about 1640. Her father, Gardner Kimball Eastman, was born in Boscawen, New Hampshire. The Genealogy of the Eastman Family in America, by Guy Scoby Rix, records that Gardner Kimball Eastman was called "Bonus". The mother, Mary Flanders, was born in Warner, New Hampshire, the daughter of Philip Flanders. In religion, her parents were Universalists, but they were not church members.

Eastman was a good student. Her education in early childhood was received mainly in the public schools of Lowell, and at the same time, by instruction in private classes in drawing, painting, horseback riding, dancing, and later, in the Lewis gymnastics. The public course ended with Lowell High School and a seminary for young woman. On the advice of a favorite teacher, she then entered a State Normal School at West Newton, Massachusetts (now Framingham State University), which went on to inspire Eastman to become a teacher.

== Career ==
Directly after graduating from high school, she was invited to take charge of the high school at Brookfield, Massachusetts. When Antioch College in Ohio opened, under the leadership of Horace Mann, he urged Eastman and a classmate at the normal school to enter as pupils. Notwithstanding their high esteem for Mann, Eastman's parents felt that Ohio was too far away. After she had become a teacher, Mann invited Eastman to come as instructor in the preparatory classes of the college, with mature pupils, most of whom were older than Eastman. She remained here till near the end of Mann's life.

In pursuance of Mann's recommendation before his death, she was solicited by Minister Domingo Faustino Sarmiento, then representing the Argentine Republic in the U.S., to take charge of introducing into the South American Republic a system of schools substantially as it had been developed in New England. Eastman, after due consideration of her youth and inexperience, declined the important work. Returning to New England, she took charge of the Female Department of the Lowell High School, her alma mater, which had nearly 200 pupils. After four years service, she resigned to take charge of a seminary for young ladies at Meadville, Pennsylvania, endowed by the benefactions of the Huidekoper family. During her seven-year stay here, she lived in the home of Mr. and Mrs. Alfred Huidekoper.

Eastman prepared the biography of Dr. Dio Lewis and contributed the section on "History of the Education of Women in the Eastern States", to a volume on Woman's Work in America.

In Tewksbury, she served on the school committee and aided in establishing the public library and the Village Improvement Association.

She entered the lecture-field in support of educational, political, and other reforms, with lectures on travel and on literary topics, meeting with a cordial reception from the public. One evening at a reception at the Unitarian Divinity School a group fell into a conversation which led to some consideration of woman suffrage. After the party was over, the students met, and voted to invite Eastman to give her views on the subject more fully in their chapel, and appointed a committee to extend the invitation. An audience gathered, and this was her first public address.

On returning to Massachusetts, she was invited by Lucy Stone to deliver the address in New England. This inaugurated a work of many years throughout the country and its adjacent provinces that was lectured upon from the platform and occasionally from the pulpit. This work proved of the deepest interest to Eastman, who worked in this cause with Lucy Stone, Susan B. Anthony, Elizabeth Cady Stanton, Mary Livermore, and their contemporary peers. From the platform, she spoke along the lines of reform in way of "Equal Suffrage," "Progress in the Aims and Methods of Education," "Rights and Wrongs of the Indians," "Duties of Government," "Literature," "Travel," and other miscellaneous topics. Her arguments were always logical and given with candor. She received encouragement from her audiences, the press, and from the leaders of thought throughout the U.S.

== Death ==
Mary F. Eastman died at her home in Tewksbury, Massachusetts, November 1, 1908, where she lived a number of years.
