= Flower Mission =

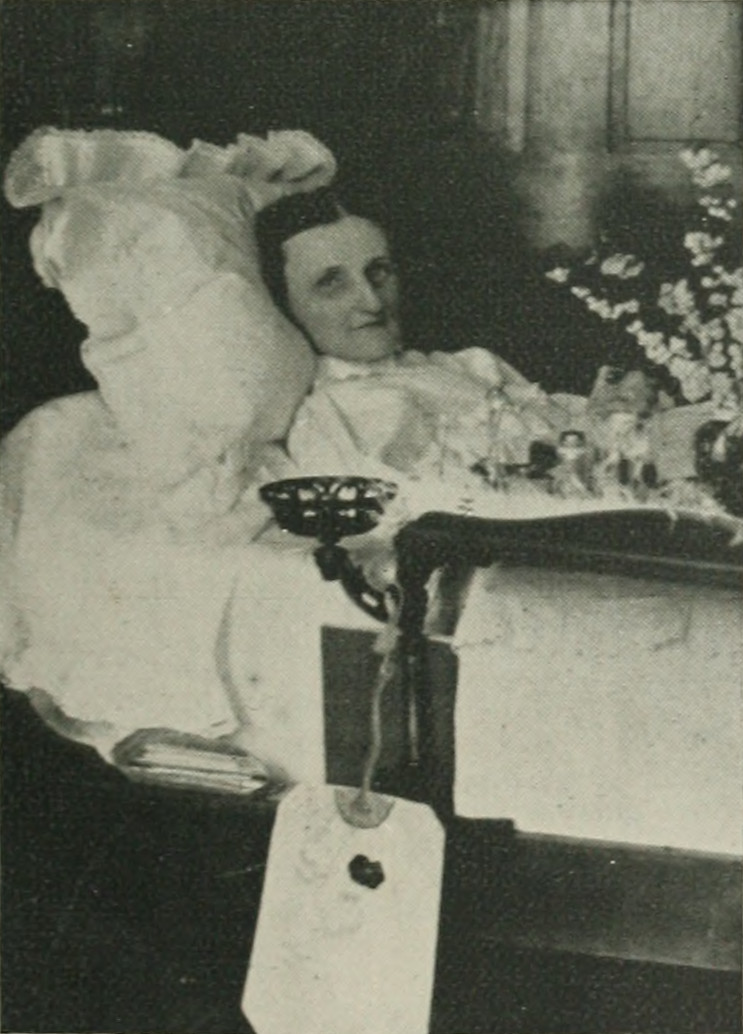
Jennie Casseday

Flower Mission (also known as Louisville Flower Mission and Flower Mission Department) was an international women's benevolent association of volunteers. It was founded by the bedridden Jennie Casseday in Louisville, Kentucky in 1878. Epitomizing "friendly visiting" and organized relief, branches were established in many U.S. cities and foreign countries. With a motto of "Help for all who need it", its purpose was to carry flowers that contained a text of scripture to those who were sick, poor, or in prison.

== Inspiration ==
The New York Observer was the most notable religious paper of its day, and had been taken in the Casseday family home since its inception. In 1869, it carried the story of a young Boston woman, teaching in Roxbury, Massachusetts, who, as she passed from place to place, noticed the great waste of flowers and fruits in the gardens of the rich occupants, most notable when the owners were absent, or in the summer. Sometimes, the teacher was given a bunch of roses and these she invariably gave away to the children of the streets, children of poverty. Later, this Boston woman secured baskets of flowers and small fruits and made little detours on her way to school, so as to reach even the poorer districts. It was a simple act, simply done.

== Establishment ==
"The aim of the Flower Mission is to lead burdened souls up to Christ, and to teach them to cast their cares on Him who careth for them. The work is to cheer and comfort all who need a friend, and to help the poor to help themselves. the text is: Bear ye one another's burdens and so fulfill the law of Christ." -Jennie Casseday

The Boston story caught the attention and interest of the disabled Casseday, as she lay in her bed. Inspired by it, she came to realize the possibilities of a ministry, for which she developed a plan. Casseday called to her bedside the influential women of Louisville, recognizing that what she hoped to create demanded team work and organization. Those whom she called came and plans were perfected at Casseday's bedside. A public meeting was arranged. Editors offered their columns; reporters did their best to float her project in a favorable fashion, and The Courier-Journal presented the use of a large room in its building with tables ready for tying up flowers. By the time of the first bouquet going forth, the tables were heaped with flowers and the room was crowded with flower missionaries.

== Prison Day ==
Casseday, confined to narrow quarters because of her disability, soon began thinking of all sorts of "prisoners" and began planning to send the message of the flowers to state prisons. Her board cooperated with her and on Casseday's birthday, June 9, the day was set apart as Flower Mission Prison Day. By this time, Flower Missions had grown up in most of the U.S. States and large plans were made to visit all State and local prisons and reformatories on June 9. The cooperation of officers of prisons was secured beforehand, the number of prisoners learned, and it was asked that prisoners be asked to assemble in their chapels at a fixed hour. It was arranged to present each prisoner with a bouquet made of "something white, something bright, something sweet." A requisite was that each bouquet must have a text of scripture attached to it by a fine wire. Casseday herself selected a large number of texts and had them printed. But a missionary was at liberty to choose her own texts and write them with a pen.

== International expansion ==
With Flower Missions inaugurated in forty different U.S. states and territories, it did not take long for the story of the Louisville Flower Mission and its invalid designer to spread abroad. Letters came to Casseday from all over the world. Baroness Mathilda Wrede introduced Flower Mission methods into prisons in Finland. A "Jennie Casseday Flower Mission" was organized in Pretoria, South Africa, and another in Rio de Janeiro, Brazil.

== Woman's Christian Temperance Union department ==
In 1889, the "Society of Christian Workers" held its annual meeting in New York City and its secretary requested Casseday to send to it information regarding her Flower Mission work. Casseday responded by sending a letter, which was read from the platform. There was at once a large demand for copies of this and it was soon put in booklet form for the convenience of all who wanted to know about this public service:—

"It was four years after the Louisville Flower Mission was organized that Miss Frances E. Willard was in Louisville, the guest of my sister, Mrs. John Duncan. On the very last morning of her stay, she came to my room and asked me to tell her all about my Mission work. I told it as simply and fully as I could and she listened intently. When I had finished, Miss Willard, with that quick perception and ready insight for which she is so remarkable, saw how Flower Missions might be grafted on to temperance work and bring forth rich harvests of good to both. She rose to her feet exclaiming, 'I have an inspiration; it is to establish a Flower Mission Department of the Woman's Christian Temperance Union, and put you at its head as National Superintendent.' The very idea appalled me, and I felt it was impossible for me either to take on more work or to think of undertaking, from my little corner, a National Flower Mission.

At the next meeting of the National WCTU in 1881, Willard spoke of Casseday and the Flower Missions. Then she proposed Casseday as "first Superintendent of a new department of the WCTU—the Flower Mission Department." Casseday was unanimously elected, and in a short while, she was elected to be Superintendent of the World's WCTU Flower Mission, which she held until her death.

Just fifteen years after Casseday had become President of the National Flower Mission, her department reported to the National Convention of the WCTU that the Flower Mission Department had distributed more than 1,555,466 bouquets, 34,972 growing plants, 403,691 text cards, 1,398,122 pages of Flower Mission literature, 38,350 tumblers and jars of jelly and preserves, 15,788 bushels of fruit and vegetables, and 134,211 articles of clothing; 317,735 visits had been made to the poor and sick, besides 14,262 to public institutions, while 19,505 drives and outings were given to poor children, invalids and other worthy people.

== Louisville Flower Mission ==
Casseday remained as the head of the Louisville Flower Mission, which was not organized under the WCTU, as it was not considered wise to connect its work with that of the temperance association.

== Selected works ==
The National WCTU Publishing House in Evanston, Illinois published and sold leaflets pertaining to Flower Mission Day on June 9.

- Suggestions for Flower Mission Day and Program for June 9
- Sentry Duty for All in the Department of Flower Mission
- The Lady of the Flower Mission
- Story of the Flower Mission Department—It Blossomed—It Grew—It Spread

== See also ==
- Flower delivery
