= List of Woman's Christian Temperance Union people =

This is a list of people associated with the Woman's Christian Temperance Union (W.C.T.U.).

== Presidents ==
The presidents of the WCTU and their terms of office are:

1. 1874-79 - Annie Turner Wittenmyer
2. 1879-98 - Frances Willard
3. 1898-14 - Lillian M. N. Stevens
4. 1914-25 - Anna Adams Gordon
5. 1925-33 - Ella A. Boole
6. 1933-44 - Ida B. Wise
7. 1944-53 - Mamie White Colvin
8. 1953-59 - Agnes Dubbs Hays
9. 1959-74 - Ruth Tibbets Tooze
10. 1974-80 - Edith Kirkendall Stanley
11. 1980-88 - Martha Greer Edgar
12. 1988-96 - Rachel Bubar Kelly
13. 1996-2006 - Sarah Frances Ward
14. 2006-14 - Rita Kaye Wert
15. 2014-19 - Sarah Frances Ward
16. 2019 - Current - Merry Lee Powell

== Editors of The Union Signal ==
Editors of the WCTU's organ, The Union Signal and its former namesakes, The Woman's Temperance Union, and Our Union have included:

- Mary Bannister Willard (January 1883 - July 1885)
- Mary Allen West (July 1885 - 1892)
- Harriet B. Kells (1891-1894)
- Frances Willard (1892 - February 1898)
- Lillian M. N. Stevens (February 1898 - April 1914)
- Anna Adams Gordon (April 1914 - October 1926)
- Ella Boole (October 1926 - October 1933)
- Ida B. Wise Smith (October 1933 - )

== Notable people ==
=== A ===
- Sarah C. Acheson
- Jessie Ackermann
- Lucia H. Faxon Additon
- Mary Osburn Adkinson
- Mary Jane Aldrich
- Eunice Gibbs Allyn
- Edith Archibald
- Louisa Ardill
- Ida A. T. Arms
- Lily Atkinson

=== B ===
- Clara Babcock (1850-1925)
- Blanche Pentecost Bagley (1858-1928)
- Lepha Eliza Bailey (1845-1924)
- Mrs. L. Dow Balliett (1847-1929)
- Helen Morton Barker (1834-1910)
- Frances Julia Barnes (1846-1920)
- Susan Hammond Barney (1834-1922)
- Emma Curtiss Bascom (1828-1916)
- Josephine Cushman Bateham (1829-1901)
- Emma Pow Bauder (1848-1932)
- Marion Babcock Baxter (1850-1910)
- Frances Estill Beauchamp (1860-1923)
- Emma Lee Benedict (1857-1937)
- Anna Smeed Benjamin (1834-1924)
- Mary Crowell Van Benschoten (1840-1921)
- Martia L. Davis Berry (1844-1894)
- Belle G. Bigelow (1851-1925)
- Lettie S. Bigelow (1849-1906)
- Mary Fleming Black (1848-1893)
- Suessa Baldridge Blaine (1860-1932)
- Ellen A. Dayton Blair (1837-1926)
- Emily Rose Bleby (1849-1917)
- Astrid Blume (1872-1924)
- Mary Shuttleworth Boden (1840-1922)
- Lizzie Borden (1860-1927)
- Caroline G. Boughton (1854-1905)
- Emma Bourne (1846-1924)
- Emma E. Bower (1852-1937)
- Euphemia Bridges Bowes (1816-1900)
- Ada Chastina Bowles (1836-1928)
- Leah Belle Kepner Boyce (1881-1960)
- Kate Parker Scott Boyd (1836-1922)
- Ann Weaver Bradley (1834–1913)
- Marie C. Brehm (1859-1926)
- Libbie Beach Brown (1858-1924)
- Caroline Brown Buell (1843-1927)
- Helen Louise Bullock (1836-1927)
- Annie Babbitt Bulyea (1863-1934)
- Adda Burch (1869-1929)
- Nelle G. Burger (1869-1957)
- Emeline S. Burlingame (1836-1923)
- Cynthia S. Burnett (1840-1932)
- Woodnut S. Burr (1861-1952)
- Mary Towne Burt (1842-1898)
- Mary Ryerson Butin (1857–1944)
- Lucy Wood Butler (1820-1895)
- Alice Sudduth Byerly (1855-1904)

=== C ===
- Alice A. W. Cadwallader
- Emor L. Calkins
- Clara H. Sully Carhart
- Matilda Carse
- Annie Carvosso
- Jennie Casseday
- Rebecca Ballard Chambers
- Nettie Sanford Chapin
- Sallie F. Chapin
- Rose Woodallen Chapman
- Fanny DuBois Chase
- Louise L. Chase
- Annetta R. Chipp
- Mamie Claflin
- Annie W. Clark
- Alice Culler Cobb
- Clara Amelia Rankin Coblentz
- Cordelia Throop Cole
- Julia Colman
- Emily M. J. Cooley
- Mary Ann Mann Cornelius
- Sara Jane Crafts
- Mary Helen Peck Crane
- Ella D. Crawford
- Belle Caldwell Culbertson
- Mary S. Cummins
- Mary Ann Cunningham
- Nannie Webb Curtis

=== D ===
- Frances Brackett Damon
- Mary R. Denman
- Lella A. Dillard
- Hannah P. Dodge
- Mary L. Doe
- Sara J. Dorr
- Eva Craig Graves Doughty
- Alice May Douglas
- Lavantia Densmore Douglass
- Cornelia M. Dow
- Sarah Jane Corson Downs
- Marion Howard Dunham
- Harriet Ball Dunlap
- Julia Knowlton Dyer

=== E ===
- Ida Horton East
- Mary G. Charlton Edholm
- Margaret Dye Ellis
- Mrs. A. Elmore
- Lelia Dromgold Emig
- Rhoda A. Esmond
- Addie Garwood Estes
- Sarah Lindsay Evans
- Nellie Blessing Eyster

=== F ===
- Mary J. Farnham
- Rebecca Latimer Felton
- Susan Frances Nelson Ferree
- Susan Fessenden
- Judith Ellen Foster
- Jessie Forsyth
- Bertha Fowler
- Susanna M. D. Fry
- Eliza Nelson Fryer (1847-1910)
- Minnie Rutherford Fuller

=== G ===
- Jane Gemmill
- Harriet E. Garrison
- Ella M. George
- Eugenia Gibson
- Ruby I. Gilbert
- T. Adelaide Goodno
- Amelia Elizabeth Roe Gordon
- Anna Adams Gordon
- Elizabeth Putnam Gordon
- Frances W. Graham
- Charlotte A. Gray
- Eva Kinney Griffith
- Hattie Tyng Griswold
- Sophronia Farrington Naylor Grubb

=== H ===
- Anna M. Hammer
- Jane Louisa Hardy
- Margaret Keenan Harrais
- Antoinette Arnold Hawley
- Utako Hayashi
- Rebecca Naylor Hazard
- S. M. I. Henry
- Maria Hyde Hibbard
- Eliza Trask Hill
- Mary G. Hill
- Emily Caroline Chandler Hodgin
- Clara Cleghorn Hoffman
- Sarah Haines Smith Hoge
- Julia Holder
- Lillian Hollister
- Jennie Florella Holmes
- Mary Emma Holmes
- Annabel Morris Holvey
- Louise Seymour Houghton
- Esther Housh
- Emeline Harriet Howe
- Laura E. Howey
- Adrianna Hungerford
- Augusta Merrill Hunt
- Mary Hunt
- Sarah Huston

=== I ===
- Mary Bigelow Ingham
- Eliza Buckley Ingalls
- Mary E. Ireland
- Stella B. Irvine
- Hannah M. Underhill Isaac

=== J ===
- Katharine Johnson Jackson
- Mary T. Jeffries
- Frances C. Jenkins
- Therese A. Jenkins
- Georgia May Jobson
- Kristine Martine Johannessen
- Laura M. Johns
- Carrie Ashton Johnson
- Mary Coffin Johnson

=== K ===
- Ella Eaton Kellogg
- Agnes Kemp
- Jennie Murray Kemp
- Ella B. Kendrick
- Georgina Kermode
- Regina Khayatt
- M. Evelyn Killen
- Deborah G. King
- Eunice D. Kinney
- Narcissa Edith White Kinney
- Janette Hill Knox
- Katherine Kurt

=== L ===
- Imogen LaChance
- Sarah Doan La Fetra
- Anna Matilda Larrabee
- Mary Torrans Lathrap
- Maria Elise Turner Lauder
- Emma C. Laugenour
- Louisa Lawson
- Louise M. Lawson
- Olive Moorman Leader
- Mary Greenleaf Clement Leavitt
- Willie Kirkpatrick Lindsay
- Lilah Denton Lindsey
- Deborah Knox Livingston
- Mary Anne Lockwood
- Mary Frances Lovell
- Margaret Bright Lucas

=== M ===
- Mary L. Mallett
- Eugenia St. John Mann
- Nellie V. Mark
- Abbie K. Mason
- Lena B. Mathes
- Asa Matsuoka
- Harriet Calista Clark McCabe
- Mary A. McCurdy
- Elizabeth McCracken
- Olive Dickerson McHugh
- Alice Cary McKinney
- Margaret McLean
- Georgie A. Hulse McLeod
- Esther Lord McNeill
- Luella F. McWhirter
- Jeanette DuBois Meech
- Caroline Elizabeth Merrick
- Mary E. Metzgar
- Elizabeth Smith Middleton
- Lillian M. Mitchner
- Ruth Emma Mitten
- Henrietta G. Moore
- Cornelia Moore Chillson Moots
- Mary L. Moreland
- Amy Kellogg Morse
- Margaret Cairns Munns

=== N ===
- Carrie Nation
- Minnie E. Neal
- A. Viola Neblett
- Angelia Thurston Newman
- Josephine R. Nichols
- Della Whitney Norton

=== O ===
- Martha B. O'Donnell
- Marie Augusta Oldham
- Ólafía Jóhannsdóttir

=== P ===
- Hannah Borden Palmer
- Maude B. Perkins
- Sarah Maria Clinton Perkins
- Alice E. Heckler Peters
- Belle L. Pettigrew
- Levancia Holcomb Plumb
- Anna Weed Prosser
- Esther Pugh
- Louise C. Purington
- Jennie Phelps Purvis

=== Q ===
- Althea G. Quimby (1858-1942)
- H. Anna Quinby (1871-1931)

=== R ===
- Emily Lee Sherwood Ragan
- Rachel Beasley Ray
- Mary Bynon Reese
- Anna Rankin Riggs
- Mary A. Ripley
- Laura Jacinta Rittenhouse
- Lucy Henderson Owen Robertson
- Amber E. Robinson
- Jessie Rooke
- Ellen Sergeant Rude
- Elizabeth Augusta Russell
- Elizabeth Lownes Rust

=== S ===
- Susanna M. Salter
- Mary McKay Scott
- Semane Setlhoko Khama
- Kate Sheppard
- Jane E. Sibley
- Jennie Hart Sibley
- Katherine Call Simonds
- Josephine E. Sizer
- Henrietta Skelton
- Eliza Brown Newton Smart
- Elizabeth J. Smith
- Eva Munson Smith
- Mary Bell Smith
- Olive White Smith
- Hedvig Sohlberg
- Georgiana Solomon
- Dorcas James Spencer
- Ruth Hinshaw Spray
- Josephine Sprott
- Elizabeth Tipton Stanley
- Amelia Minerva Starkweather
- Susan J. Swift Steele
- Emily Pitts Stevens
- Lillian M. N. Stevens
- Katharine Lente Stevenson
- Eliza Daniel Stewart
- Jane Agnes Stewart
- Gabrella Townley Stickney
- Mary Ingram Stille
- Anna E. Stoddard
- Missouri H. Stokes
- Evelyn Strang
- Maria Straub
- Flora E. Strout
- Katie Stuart (reformer)
- Beaumelle Sturtevant-Peet
- Margaret Ashmore Sudduth
- Frances L. Swift
- Lucy Robbins Messer Switzer

=== T ===
- Hannah E. Taylor
- Eva Griffith Thompson
- Mandana Coleman Thorp
- Lydia H. Tilton
- Frances E. Townsley
- Anna Augusta Truitt
- Alice Bellvadore Sams Turner

=== U-V ===
- Augusta W. Urquhart
- Martha Van Marter
- Culla Johnson Vayhinger

=== W ===
- Phoebe Jane Babcock Wait
- Anne Ward
- Elizabeth Jane Ward
- Lala Fay Watts
- Minnie Welch
- Mary Allen West
- M. Ella Whipple
- Reah Whitehead
- Sophronia Wilson Wagoner
- Mary A. Hitchcock Wakelin
- Adelaide Cilley Waldron
- Mary Evalin Warren
- Lucy Hall Washington
- Laura Moore Westbrook
- Agnes Weston
- Mary Sparkes Wheeler
- Dora V. Wheelock
- Laura Rosamond White
- Hannah Tyler Wilcox
- Margaret Ray Wickens
- Jennie Fowler Willing
- Drusilla Wilson
- Ella B. Ensor Wilson
- Zara A. Wilson
- Charlotte S. Winchell
- Ida B. Wise
- Mary A. Brayton Woodbridge
- Caroline M. Clark Woodward
- Mary Chawner Woody
- Sarah Rowell Wright

=== Y ===
- Lenna Lowe Yost
