= Kate Scott =

Kate Scott may refer to:

- Kate Scott Turner (née Scott, 1831–1917), American poet
- Kate Parker Scott Boyd (née Scott, 1836–1922), American artist, journalist, and temperance worker
- Kate Scott (medical researcher) (born 1960), New Zealand medical researcher
- Kate Scott (British presenter) (born 1981), British sports broadcaster
- Kate Scott (American sportscaster) (born 1983/1984), American sports commentator
- Kate Scott, fictional character in the Japanese novel, manga and anime series Trinity Blood

== See also ==
- Katherine Scott (disambiguation)
- Catherine Scott (disambiguation)
