= Catherine Scott =

Catherine Scott may refer to:

- Catherine Eliza Richardson (née Scott, 1777–1853), Scottish author and poet
- Catherine Amy Dawson Scott (1865–1934), English writer, playwright and poet
- Catherine Scott (librarian) (1927–2010), American librarian
- Catherine Scott (athlete) (born 1973), Jamaican hurdler and runner

== See also ==
- Katherine Scott (disambiguation)
- Kate Scott (disambiguation)
- Cathy Scott (Cathleen Scott, born c. 1950), American true crime author and investigative journalist
