= Sarah Huston =

American newspaper editor and activist (1848–1926)

- Born: Sarah Ann Laugenour; March 19, 1848; Salem, North Carolina, U.S.
- Died: August 24, 1926 (aged 78); Woodland, California, U.S.
- Education: Salem College
- Occupations: newspaper editor and publisher
- Spouse: Walter Scott Huston (m. 1869; died 1894)
- Children: 6
- Writing career
- Pen name: "Aunt Sally" (sobriquet)
- Notable work: Home Alliance
- Movements: temperance; prohibition; suffrage movements

Sarah Huston (née Laugenour; sobriquet Aunt Sally; 1848-1926) was an American newspaper editor and publisher who supported the temperance, prohibition, and suffrage movements in California. For 35 years, Huston owned and edited the Home Alliance, characterized by the Woodland Daily Democrat as "probably California's best known weekly devoted to the cause of Prohibition." This made her one of the few women publishers in California in her day. Huston was referred to by the sobriquet of "Aunt Sally". In addition to her newspaper work, Huston was a Yolo County farmer.

== Early life and education ==
Sarah Ann Laugenour was born March 19, 1848, in Salem, North Carolina. Her parents were Samuel H. and Lisetta (Fisher) Laugenour. Huston was the oldest of twelve children, four of whom died in infancy.

She was the descendant of German ancestors on the paternal side. The grandmother on the maternal side was in maidenhood a Miss Hamilton from Scotland. Early representatives of the Laugenour family were members of the Moravian Church and located in the Moravian settlement in Forsyth County, North Carolina where Count Nicolaus Zinzendorf had purchased a grant of land for the purpose of establishing a boarding school for girls in Salem. Her parents were members of the Baptist Church.

Her childhood was spent on a Southern plantation. As a young girl, she experienced the deprivations of a Southern family during the days of the civil war.

She was educated at Salem College, in the Moravian community of Salem.

The family arrived in Yolo County, California, November 26, 1866, by way of Cape Horn, and located on a farm near Knights Landing,, continuing there for a few years or until removing to College City, Colusa County.

== Career ==
From 1866 till 1869, Huston taught school between Knights Landing and Woodland. Joe Jacobs, mayor of Woodland at the time of Huston's death, was one of "Miss Laugenour's pupils".

In January 1869, she married Walter Scott Huston (1830-1894),a widower and a Forty Niner, having crossed the plains from Boone County, Missouri to California during the gold boom. He farmed near Woodland in the 1850s and then moved to Knights Landing to engage in the mercantile business. They were involved in the establishment of Hesperian College (now Chapman University). The Hustons united with the Woodland Christian Church by letter from the Knights Landing Church soon after their removal from the former city.

For the first ten years of their marriage, they lived at Knights' Landing, where Mr. Huston had a mercantile business. After the disastrous flood of 1878, they moved to Woodland to make their permanent home.

She joined the Woodland Woman's Christian Temperance Union (WCTU) when organized by Frances Willard in 1883. During Willard's visit, she addressed an immense audience in the Woodland Christian Church that stood by the Hesperian College. Willard admonished Huston then to always keep sweet when fighting the battle of their cause, and Huston adhered to it ever after. After uniting with the organization, Huston served as president of the local union, as county president, and as county superintendent of press work for twenty-seven years. She would go on to be a delegate to the State conventions of the WCTU.

In 1884, Huston was appointed press superintendent for the WCTU. For a time, a column devoted to the cause was published in the Democrat and the Mail.

In 1890, the health of her husband failed and Huston had to find a way to care for him and to continue the education of their five children. She established a printing office for "job work of all kinds".

In the following year, within the scope of her WCTU work, Huston and her aunt, Emma C. Laugenour, founded the Home Alliance, on July 7, 1891. This Yolo County weekly Devoted to prohibition and woman's suffrage, initially, it was the only publication in the state that fought the legalized liquor traffic.

While the printing office for "job work of all kinds" and the Home Alliance did not bring in great financial returns, through it, Huston was able to educate her children. Until very close to her death, she not only directed the Home Alliance, but handled most of the details aside from the mechanical ones.

Huston heard William Jennings Bryan mention her name over the radio and corresponded with him for years. Bryan and Woodrow Wilson were statesmen who measured up to Huston's ideals and were earnest in their efforts to bring about world peace. Bryan never failed to call upon Huston when he was near Woodland.

Huston favored woman suffrage and was active in the campaign which won equal suffrage for California. She was also instrumental in organizing the Woodland Volunteer Fire Department and aided it since its establishment.

== Personal life ==
Huston was head of one of the oldest and best known Yolo County families. The couple's children were Walter S., Arthur C., Edward P., Mary (died in infancy), Harry L., and Bertha.

In religion, she was a member of Woodland's Christian Church. In politics, she was independent.

An attack of influenza in 1924 left Huston in a weakened condition, and her health failed rapidly thereafter, with a general collapse four weeks before her death in Woodland, on August 24, 1926.
