= Adda Burch =

American missionary teacher and temperance leader

- Born: Adelaide Grace Burch; January 6, 1869; Greenville, Pennsylvania, U.S.
- Died: February 18, 1929 (aged 60); Los Angeles, California, U.S.
- Education: Edinboro Stale Normal School
- Employer(s): Teacher-missionary, Concepción College, via Woman's Foreign Missionary Society of the Methodist Episcopal Church
- Organizations: president, Chile Woman's Christian Temperance Union; reporter, The Union Signal
- Movement: temperance

Adda Burch (January 6, 1869 – February 18, 1929) was an American missionary teacher and temperance leader from Pennsylvania. She worked in Latin America for many years, particularly in Chile, where she served as president of the World Woman's Christian Temperance Union (WCTU) and taught at Concepción College. Her activities included promoting temperance education, organizing public meetings, distributing literature in English and Spanish, and encouraging humane treatment of animals. After returning to the United States, she continued her involvement in temperance work through leadership roles in local WCTU organizations in California. She also taught for a period in Puerto Rico, before her later years in Los Angeles.

== Early life and education ==
Adelaide (nickname, "Adda") Grace Burch was born at Greenville, Pennsylvania, January 6, 1869.

She was educated in the local schools and at the Edinboro Stale Normal School.

== Career ==
Becoming a teacher in the public schools, Burch interested herself in temperance work and joined the WCTU. She was made county superintendent of the press department, Pennsylvania State reporter to The Union Signal, and county corresponding secretary.

In 1896, she was sent by the Woman's Foreign Missionary Society of the Methodist Episcopal Church to Concepción, Chile, where she became a teacher in the Concepción College. Burch's reports from Chile included information about Humane Prize Contests, and public meetings. At one such public meeting, she translated selections from the contest book of recitations and from the catechism, "Duty of Mercy". She distributed literature in English and Spanish, especially to farmers owning stock. She introduced as a reader in Concepcion College, Amigos del Hombre, and put two copies of it in the college library. Burch gave addresses to young people on kindness to every living creature, also writing an essay on the subject. In one letter, she mentioned a league formed among the business men of Concepcion not to ride on street cars because of the cruelty to horses drawing them.

In 1897, in Chile, Burch was elected president of the country's WCTU. Burch promoted the temperance department, and temperance sentiment grew in Chili under Burch's presidency. WCTU work in that country was well represented especially in its educational phases. In Concepcion College, total abstinence sentiment was constantly inculcated and future workers for temperance were being trained. Temperance ideas were carried into other sections of Chili by the students of this College. Medal Contests, the study of the alcohol question in debate and essay, and the circulation of temperance literature, were methods employed by Burch, as well as by Ida A. T. Arms, the college's preceptress, and Arms' daughter.

Burch left Chile in April, 1922, on the steamer, Tivies, her first furlough in 15 years. In November and December of that year, she lectured in Pennsylvania about life in Chile.

Shortly after returning to the U.S., Burch was appointed teacher in a boys' school in Puerto Rico. Here, her health suffered, and at the end of the school year, she returned to the U.S. and settled in Los Angeles, California. She was at once identified with temperance movements in that city, becoming corresponding secretary of the local WCTU, county superintendent of the Press Department, and also of the City Federation.

== Death ==
Adda Grace Burch died in Los Angeles, February 18, 1929.
