= Mary Bynon Reese =

American temperance leader (1832–1908)

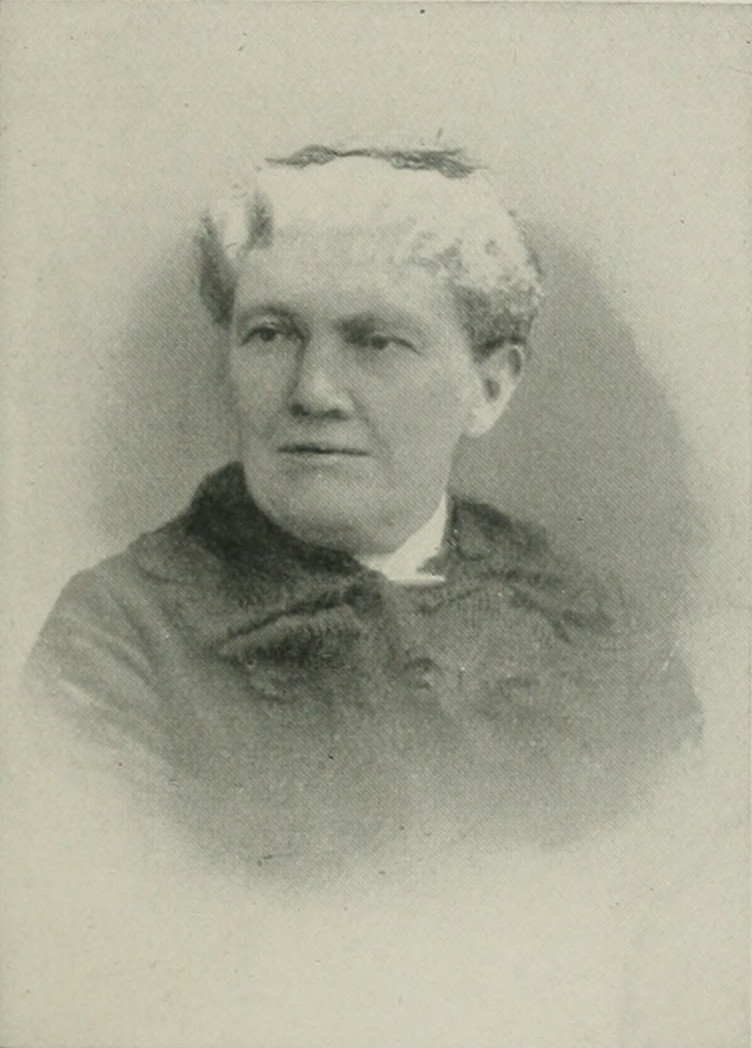
- Photo portrait from A Woman of the Century
- Born: Mary Ann Bynon; June 27, 1832; Pittsburgh, Pennsylvania, U.S.
- Died: February 8, 1908 (aged 75); Everett, Washington, U.S.
- Occupations: temperance leader, lecturer, organizer, evangelist; poet
- Organization: Woman's Christian Temperance Union
- Spouse: John G. Reese (m. 1853; died 1900)

Mary Bynon Reese (July 27, 1832 – February 8, 1908) was a leader in the U.S. temperance movement, serving as lecturer, organizer and evangelist for the Woman's Christian Temperance Union (WCTU) in Ohio, Washington state, and at the national level. She was the national WCTU superintendent of the Department of Narcotics and the World WCTU's Missionary to Japan. Reese was the poet laureate of Steubenville, Ohio.

== Early life and education ==
Mary Ann Bynon was born in Pittsburgh, Pennsylvania, June 27, 1832, of Welsh parents. While she was a child, the family removed to Wheeling, West Virginia.

She received her education at the Wheeling Female Seminary, graduating in 1847/49.

While in school, her poetic talent became noticed and she wrote frequently for local papers.

== Career ==
She became identified with the public schools of Virginia, and for a time, was one of three teachers in the only free school in the State, the Third Ward public school of Wheeling. That school was soon followed by others, in two of which she was employed.

After marrying John G. Reese (1826–1900) on January 1, 1853, in Indiana, she removed to Steubenville, Ohio, where the greater part of her life was spent.

During the civil war, her time was devoted to helping injured Union Army soldiers. She wrote a lot, including developing songs for the encouragement of the soldiers. She was poet laureate in her city, and New Year addresses, anniversary odes and cornerstone poems were always making demands upon her.

Early in life, she began writing for various publications, and for 60 years, her poems and prose articles appeared in different magazines and newspapers. For a while, she was assistant editor of the Ohio Press of Steubenville. She was for many years a contributor to Clark's School Visitor.

Just before the start of the Ohio Women's Crusade (1873–74), she removed with her family to Alliance, Ohio. She was elected Crusade president of the Alliance (Ohio) League, led the first band to the saloons and presided in all the work of the first six weeks and for the three succeeding years. While lecturing in Pittsburgh and visiting saloons with the representative women of the place, she was arrested and, with 33 others, incarcerated in the city jail, an event which roused the indignation of people and made countless friends for temperance.

After the organization of the WCTU, she was identified with the State work of Ohio, as lecturer, organizer and evangelist. Reese was one of four women who organized Ohio for the constitutional amendment campaign, in which she took an active part. In company with President William McKinley, she delivered addresses in a number of towns in eastern Ohio in the interest of the prohibition amendment to the constitution.

In 1884, she became the first national WCTU superintendent of the Department of Narcotics. In 1886, she was made one of the national organizers and sent to the north Pacific coast, where her work was very successful, organizing unions in The Dakotas, Montana, Idaho, Oregon, Utah, and Washington. She met with Nez Perce and with lumbermen. Reese estimated that her travels covered more than 6,000 miles (9,700 km), sometimes by wagon, stage, canoe, and horseback.

The Puget Sound area fascinated her, and, after a stay of nine months in the northwest, she removed in 1887 to Washington, where she resided in Chautauqua, Washington on Vashon Island, a few miles from Seattle, which she made her headquarters, as State and national organizer. She built a summer hotel there, and entertained some of the most noted people in the religious and reform movements in the U.S.

Twice, Reese was commissioned as World WCTU's Missionary to Japan.

She was a life member of the National WCTU and of the Washington State WCTU, and of the latter, was Honorary President. She was also an honorary member of the State Federation of Woman's Clubs.

== Death and legacy ==
During her later life, Reese made her home at Oak Harbor, Washington. While she had been frail for some time, Reese was ill only a week before she died in Everett, Washington, February 8, 1908.

The Loyal Temperance Legion of Everett was named in her honor.

== Selected works ==
=== Poems ===
- "Guardian Angels", 1874
- "Little Babes of Bethlehem", 1900
- "Sunrise on Mount Rainier", 1901

=== Hymn lyrics ===
- "A cry comes over the deep"
- "'Tis sweet to think, unheard"
- "Lizzie dies to-night." (Philadelphia, Daughaday & Hammond, 1861) This was written and composed expressly for Clarks School Visitor, poetry by Mary Bynon Reese, music by Stephen C. Foster. Above title the statement: 'A card was found among the effects of the wrecked steamer Hungarian, bearing the inscription 'Lizzie dies to-night.' First line: "Twas hard, our parting, mother dear."
