= Concepción College (Concepción, Chile) =

Chilean parochial day and boarding school for girls

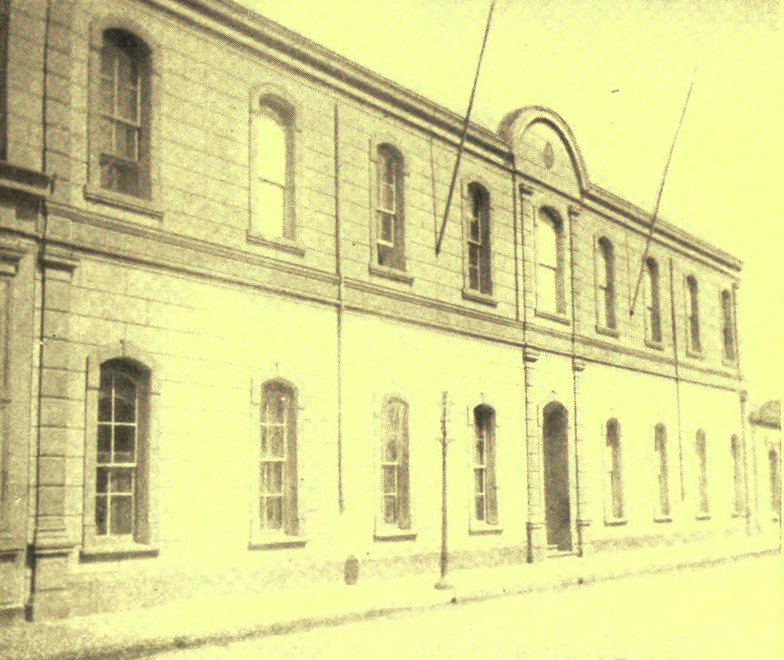
First building erected for Concepción College

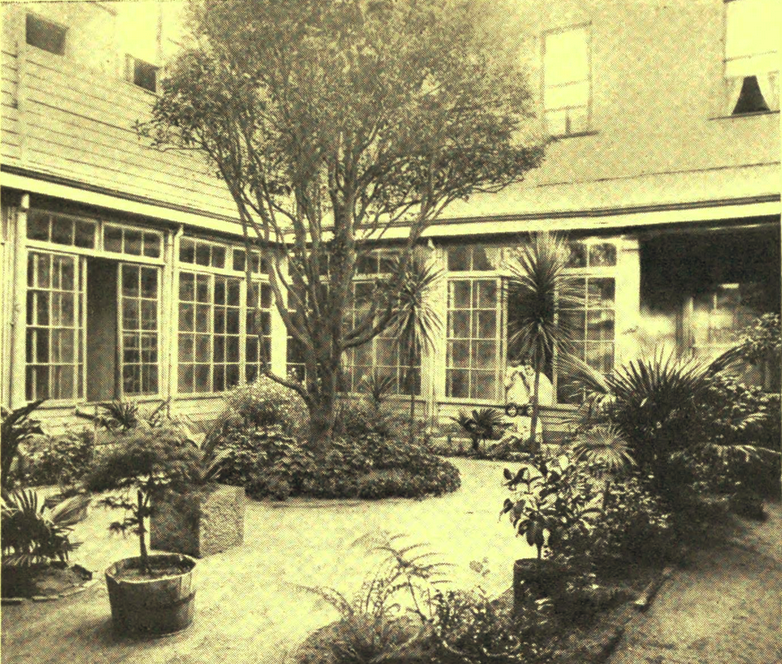
Interior courtyard

Concepción College (earlier, Colegio Americano para Senoritas) was a Chilean parochial day and boarding school for girls located in Concepción. It was established in 1878 by the Methodist Episcopal Church. The nearby sister school for boys was "The American College". Both schools were based on U.S. teaching methods and were popular with the residents of the area.

== Establishment ==
It was found that mixed-sex education was a great drawback in Concepción. The custom of the country, the ideas of the parents, and the training or lack of training which the children had had, made it difficult. At Concepción, it was deemed best to make a separate school for the girls. Another house was rented, and Lelia A. Waterhouse took charge of the separate school for girls, which was called "Colegio Americano para Senoritas", and later known as Concepcion College, and thus Concepcion College was founded. The school opened a kindergarten department which received young boys also. The school started with nine girls and ten boys. In the boarding department there were six girls. Two of them were from a British family, a home of poverty; the other four, two each, were from the homes of Chilean mothers, widows of Americans. All these were able to pay little or nothing, and Waterhouse at great personal expense maintained them in order that she might have pupils for her school. Of those six, three rendered service through teaching in the schools of the Mission and in other schools.

Often there was a lack of suitable textbooks, and the delay in securing them from the U.S. was so great that at times, from the one book on hand, the lesson was copied on the blackboard for the use of the children. As the U.S. textbooks on geography and history gave so much concerning the United States, and so very, very little about Chile, the teaching according to the textbook was displeasing to the patrons of the schools. To avoid this difficulty, Waterhouse compiled texts on history and geography for use in the Concepcion schools. A textbook was also prepared for the use of the pupils in learning English.

The houses rented were unsuitable in structure and often inadequate in room space. They were not properly furnished. The children had to be marched twice a day into the dining room when they had work which required a writing desk. In the recitation rooms, they sat upon boxes, stools, and little chairs.

Another serious drawback was that often the missionary teacher was not able to use the Spanish language. To preserve good discipline and not lose the pupil by offending the parents was a task sometimes too difficult for the teachers. A pupil lost was income lost, and without income, the school could not survive.

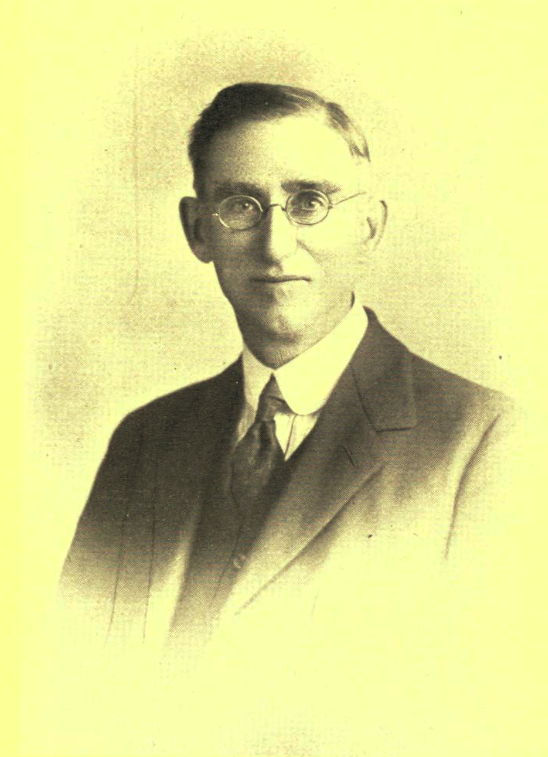
Goodsil Arms

As he could secure no other, the superintendent strongly urged the Rev. Goodsil Filley Arms to take charge of the school, which he did. He placed as preceptress Mary Stout, who was at the head of the primary department in the boys' school at Concepcion. He secured as assistants three teachers who had been educated in mission schools, two of whom had a little experience as teachers. A request for reenforcements was sent to the committee in New York City. They secured and sent out Marian A. Milks, a recent graduate from the New York City Normal College. Milks proved a great acquisition. She knew how to teach, and she had a talent for discipline which enabled her to keep order and at the same time win the admiration of her pupils. Stout cooperated with Arms in the management, and at the end of the year, after paying all accounts for the running expenses, a balance of US$1,000 was on hand, which was used in improving the equipment of the school.

== 1889–1899 ==
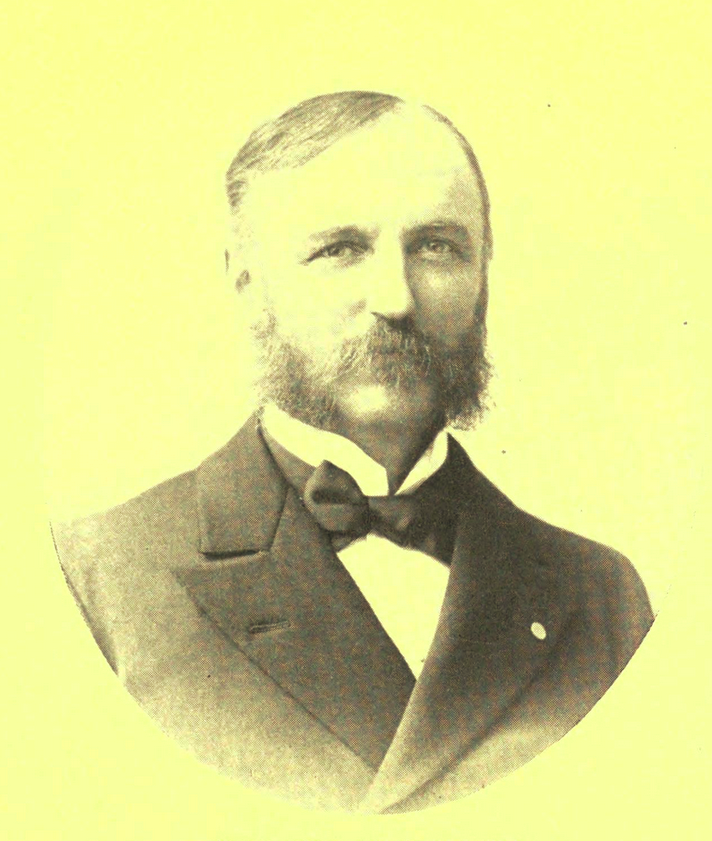
Ira LaFetra

To supply the places left vacant by the return to the U.S. of two teachers, Ira H. LaFetra, the superintendent of the mission, appointed Emma Grant and Elena Neissmann, a teacher who had been in charge of the kindergarten and had also taught German in the both schools. They had as assistant Elena Martin, who had been educated in this school. Emily Day was in the school for a time as housekeeper and assistant teacher. Some time during the second year, Neissmann married. During the third year the attendance was much less, debts had accrued, and at the end of the year, the school was left with no teachers. Due notice had not been given by the parties who left the school, so that no one to continue the work had been secured from the U.S., and no one was available from the other schools. It seemed that the Concepcion College for girls would have to be definitely closed, leaving the southern half of Chile with no evangelical school for girls.

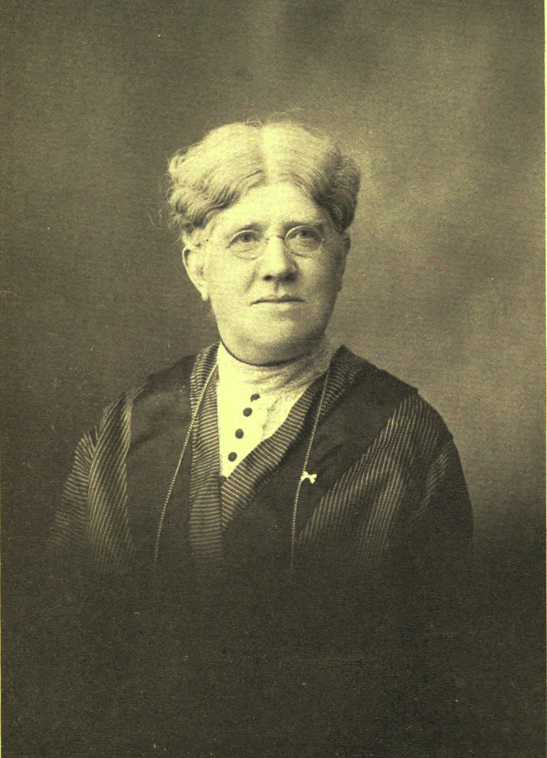
Ida Arms

During the four years that Rev. Arms and his wife, Ida A. T. Arms, had been in charge of Colegio Americano, that school had an ever-increasing prosperity; and now that Concepcion College had done so well during the first year it was under his management, the complete confidence of the directors of the Transit and Building Fund Society in New York was won. A grant of US$20,000, largely the gift of Anderson Fowler, was made for the purpose of providing a suitable building for the Concepcion College. About that time, a property was offered in Caupolican Street, one of the best locations in the city. LaFetra was notified, he approved, and the purchase was made.

On July 4, 1892, the property was purchased for 35,000 pesos (about US$13,200). It had on it a well-constructed one-story dwelling house. At the beginning of January, 1893, the work of remodeling and enlarging was begun, LaFetra coming from Santiago to aid in the plans and in starting the work. This house was remodeled by Mr. Arms, a second story was built and a large extension added to make it suitable for our girls' school, Concepcion College. The remodeling and enlarging cost 32,534 pesos. The Transit and Building Fund Society of New York furnished US$18,000, while the balance, over US$5,000, was paid out of the earnings of Concepcion College. In March 1892, the school was opened in the new building, a part only of the rooms being then ready for occupancy.

Directly after the arrival of Mr. and Mrs. Campbell, Mr. and Mrs. Arms removed from Colegio Americano to Concepcion College, and for twenty-three years, this remained their home, while Mr. and Mrs. Campbell took charge of Colegio Americano. Alice H. Fisher arrived with the Campbells and was appointed to Concepcion College; she was a trained normal teacher and also a trained art teacher.

The attendance at the school increased rapidly and the building became far too small. During the next vacation, a second story was built over the rest of the building, thus increasing the dormitories. The following year, some further additions were made. A few years later, a building was erected for the kindergarten and the art school. This was done out of the surplus earnings of the school.

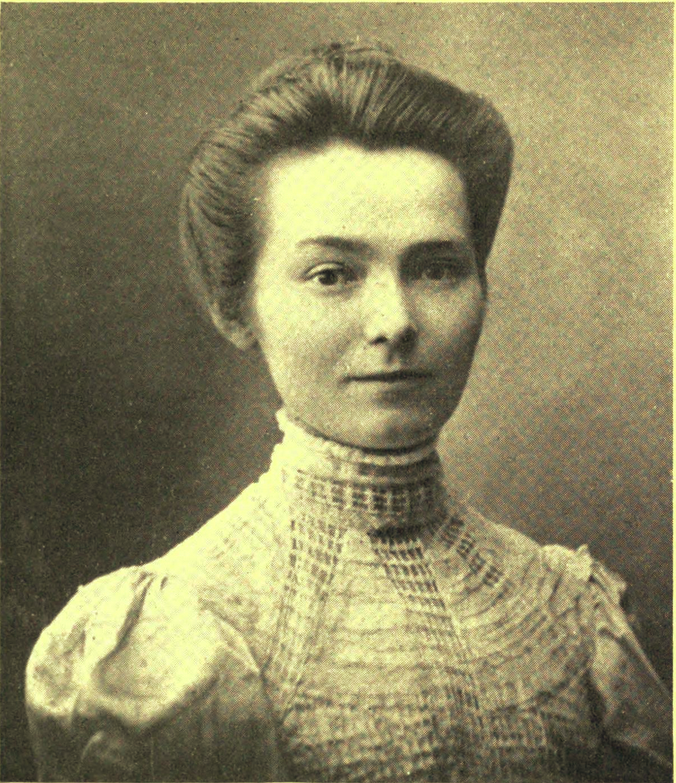
Dorothy Richard

In 1896 Dorothy M. Richard and Adda G. Burch arrived. Burch had had several years of experience as a teacher in the U.S. Richard came directly from Mount Holyoke College. Winnifred Woods had charge of the Art Department for five years during the absence of Fisher, who went to Quito, Ecuador, having been invited by that government to establish a Normal Teachers' Training School at Quito.

== 20th-century ==
Mr. and Mrs. Arms remained in charge of Concepcion College till April 1903, when he went home with his family by the Bishop's order on account of impaired health.

At some point, they returned. In a 1907 report from Mrs. Arms, in her role as principal, she stated that the school was doing well, but there was a lack of room, lack of teachers, and lack of school equipment. Of the 175 students who had matriculated that year, 84 were boarders. The school helped poor girls to be able to attend, several of the girls earning their entire support. Some taught, some were monitors, some cared for the younger children, some worked in the laundry, and others in the dining room. One half of the boarders registered as Protestants.

In Mrs. Arms' 1908 report, she mentions that she is not only the Preceptress, both also the housekeeper, house mother, teacher, bookkeeper and, in her husband's absence, general manager. She writes about the college's rapid growth in recent years. The school built a new annex and that was filled again to capacity with enrollment of about 200 of which 90 were boarders and 90 were day pupils in actual attendance. Arms organized a Concepcion Chautauqua Circle that year as well as a Literary Society.

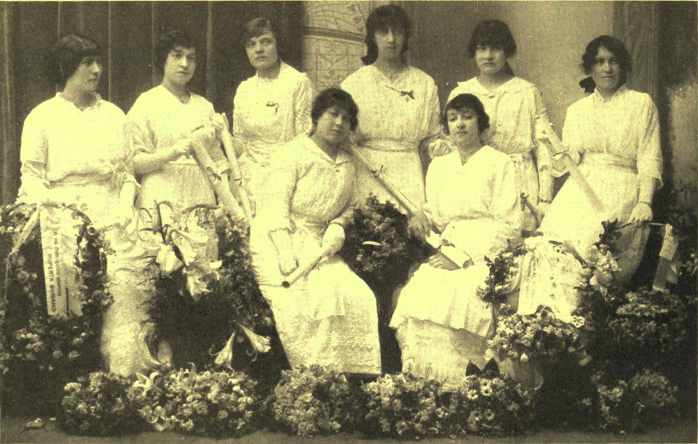
Graduates, Class of 1914

Burch returned to the U.S. in 1912.

Concepcion College continued to grow, and in July 1919, a corner lot, 1,198 square metres (12,900 sq ft), the side and rear of which joined the school property, was purchased for 100,000 pesos (about US$22,000 at the then exchange). A large old house occupied this lot. Plans were made to tear it down and construct a modern school building in the near future, the Centenary funds making this possible. The old house, in the meantime, being occupied to accommodate the increased num-ber of pupils.

== Gallery ==
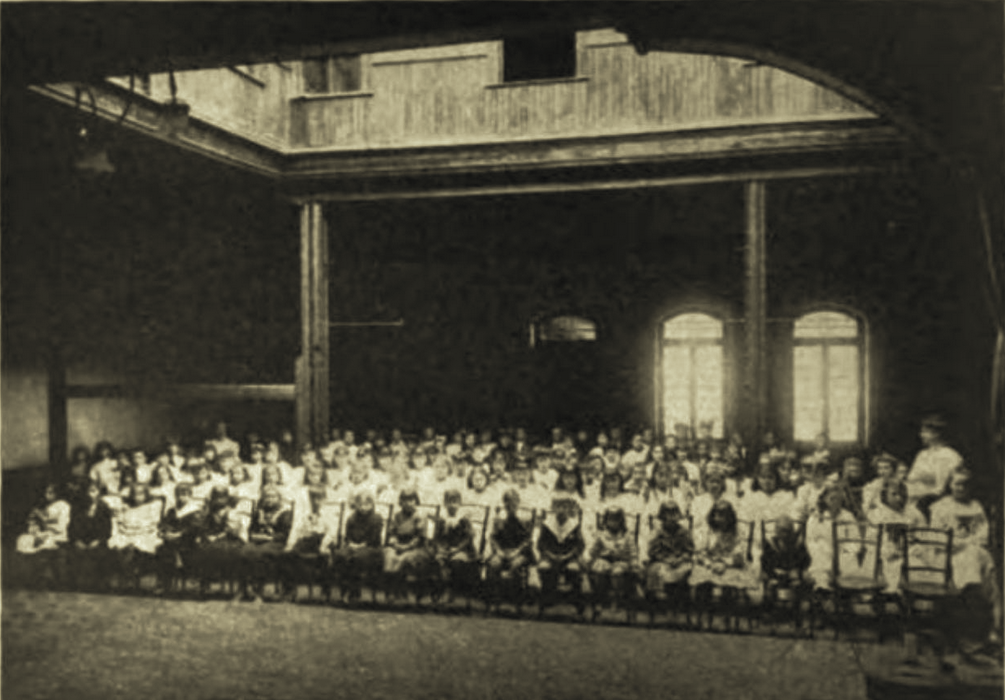
Gymnasium

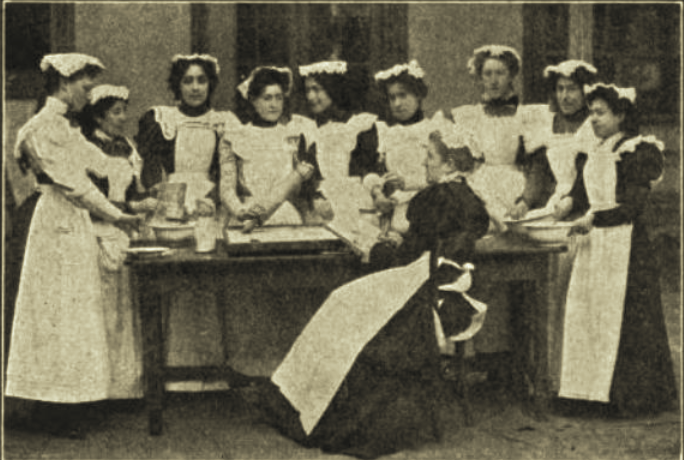
Cooking class
