= Home Alliance =

American newspaper

- Type: weekly newspaper
- Owner: Sarah Huston
- Founders: Sarah Huston; Emma C. Laugenour
- Publisher: Sarah Huston
- Editor-in-chief: Sarah Huston
- Founded: July 7, 1891
- City: Woodland, California
- Country: U.S.

The Home Alliance was an American weekly newspaper, established on July 7, 1891, and published in Woodland, California. A Yolo County weekly it was devoted to prohibition and woman's suffrage. It was owned and operated by Sarah Huston for thirty-five years. Initially, it was the only publication in California that fought the legalized liquor traffic.

== History ==
In 1891, as press superintendent for the Woman's Christian Temperance Union (WCTU), it became Huston's duty to plan and work for a temperance paper entirely devoted to WCTU work. At that time, there were 30 licensed saloons, two wineries, one brewery, and a commercialized vice district in Woodland. In face of such opposition, it seemed like such a big undertaking that had it not been for encouragement and financial assistance by W. A. Gardner, then pastor of the Woodland Christian Church, Huston may not have had the courage to continue. Through the further efforts of other citizens, a printing plant was purchased and The Home Alliance, issued. It was founded by Huston and her aunt, Emma C. Laugenour, on July 7, 1891.

The mechanical work was done the first year by William Kehoe, and afterwards, until October 1894, by Lee & Warren. At the latter date, Laugenour purchased a printing plant and established the paper in its quarters on First street, opposite the city hall.

In 1905, the printing plant and the building in which it is located became the property of the Woodland WCTU. The building contained The Home Alliance office and Christine Parlors, used for WCTU headquarters.

In 1909, The California Weekly stated that The Home Alliance was "... perhaps the oldest strictly local paper in the state which has made the fighting of the saloons the principal object of its existence."

In 1914, the editor of The Home Alliance gave the exact number of California's dry towns as 682.

== Scope ==
The Home Alliance was devoted to home protection and waged unceasing warfare on saloons in general and Yolo county saloons in particular. It was a factor in the banishment of saloons from Capay Valley, Esparto and Winters, and in the reduction in the number and power of saloons throughout the county. While owned by women and edited and published by a woman, The Home Alliance has many male friends and some of its contributors were prominent lawyers and prohibitionists of Woodland.

The Woodland Daily Democrat characterized it as "probably California's best known weekly devoted to the cause of Prohibition."
