= Katherine Scott =

Katherine, Katharine, or Kathryn Scott may refer to:

- Katherine Marbury Scott (died 1687), Quaker advocate and colonist of the Massachusetts Bay Colony
- Kathryn Scott, pseudonym used by the American composer and flutist Katherine Hoover (1937–2018)
- Kathryn Leigh Scott (born 1943), American actress and writer
- Katie Scott (born 1958), British art historian
- Kathryn Scott (singer) (born 1974), Northern Irish-born Christian songwriter and worship leader
- Katie Scott (soccer) (born 2007), American soccer player

== See also ==
- Catherine Scott (disambiguation)
- Kate Scott (disambiguation)
