= Laura Moore Westbrook =

American educator and lecturer

Laura A. Moore Westbrook
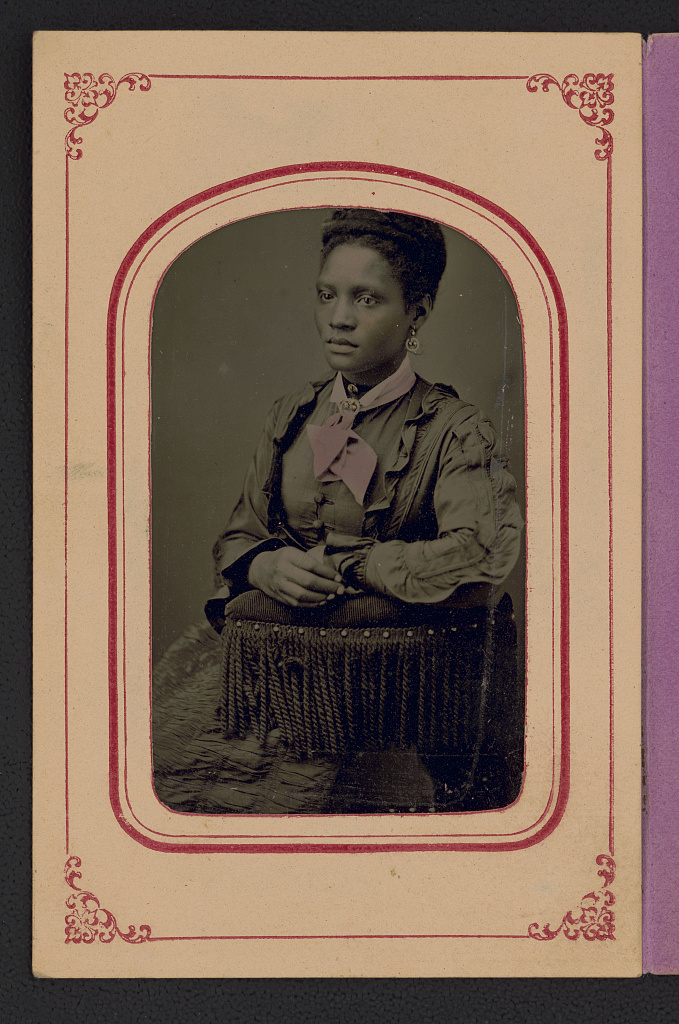
- Laura A. Moore Westbrook
- Born: 1859
- Died: 1894 (aged 34–35)

Laura A. Moore Westbrook (1859–1894) was an American educator, lecturer, and activist.

== Early life and education ==
Laura A. Moore was born to enslaved parents Amelia and Richard Moore in Tipton County, Tennessee, and likely spent the first several years of her life as an enslaved person. After five years of tutoring from Rachel Alexander, a scholar at Oberlin College, Moore began tutoring other Black girls in her community at only eleven years old. She enrolled at Central Tennessee College in 1872, completing the normal course in 1876 and then, at the urging of her teachers, going on to pursue the school's classical course. She graduated in 1880, the only woman in her class, and later received an A.M. from the same school in 1885. On July 4, 1880, Moore married the Reverend Charles P. Westbrook, one of her classmates at Central Tennessee College. The couple had a daughter.

== Career ==
In December 1880, the Westbrooks moved to Victoria, Texas, where Laura became principal of the Victoria City School and Charles became principal of the Jones Male and Female Institute. Westbrook later joined her husband at the Jones Institute, teaching there for four years. Sometime in the mid-1880s, the couple moved to Waco, Texas, where Laura taught at the W.H. Mission School and served as the second vice president of the Colored Teachers' Institute in McLennan County, Texas. Around 1889, she began teaching in the Waco public school district. During her career as a teacher, Westbrook worked with the advisory board of Texas's 22nd Senatorial District to help secure scholarships and financial aid for Black applicants to Prairie View A&M University (then called Prairie View State Normal Institute), the first state-supported college for African Americans in the United States.

In addition to her work in education, Westbrook was also a social and religious activist. During her time at the W.H. Mission School, she also served as the corresponding secretary for the W.H. Mission Society of West Texas conference, a position she held until at least 1893. She traveled throughout Texas for her mission work, lecturing at Methodist Episcopal churches, and, in 1888, attended a W.H. Mission convention in Boston as a delegate. Westbrook was also a member of the Texas state chapter of the Woman's Christian Temperance Union, which became the first WCTU branch in the South to endorse women's suffrage in 1888. Westbrook drew upon her teaching skills in her work with the WCTU, traveling through the South to speak in support of the temperance cause. Her contemporaries described her lectures as "electrifying and inspiring."

Westbrook died in 1894, at the age of thirty-five. Her cause of death is unknown.
