= Hannah M. Underhill Isaac =

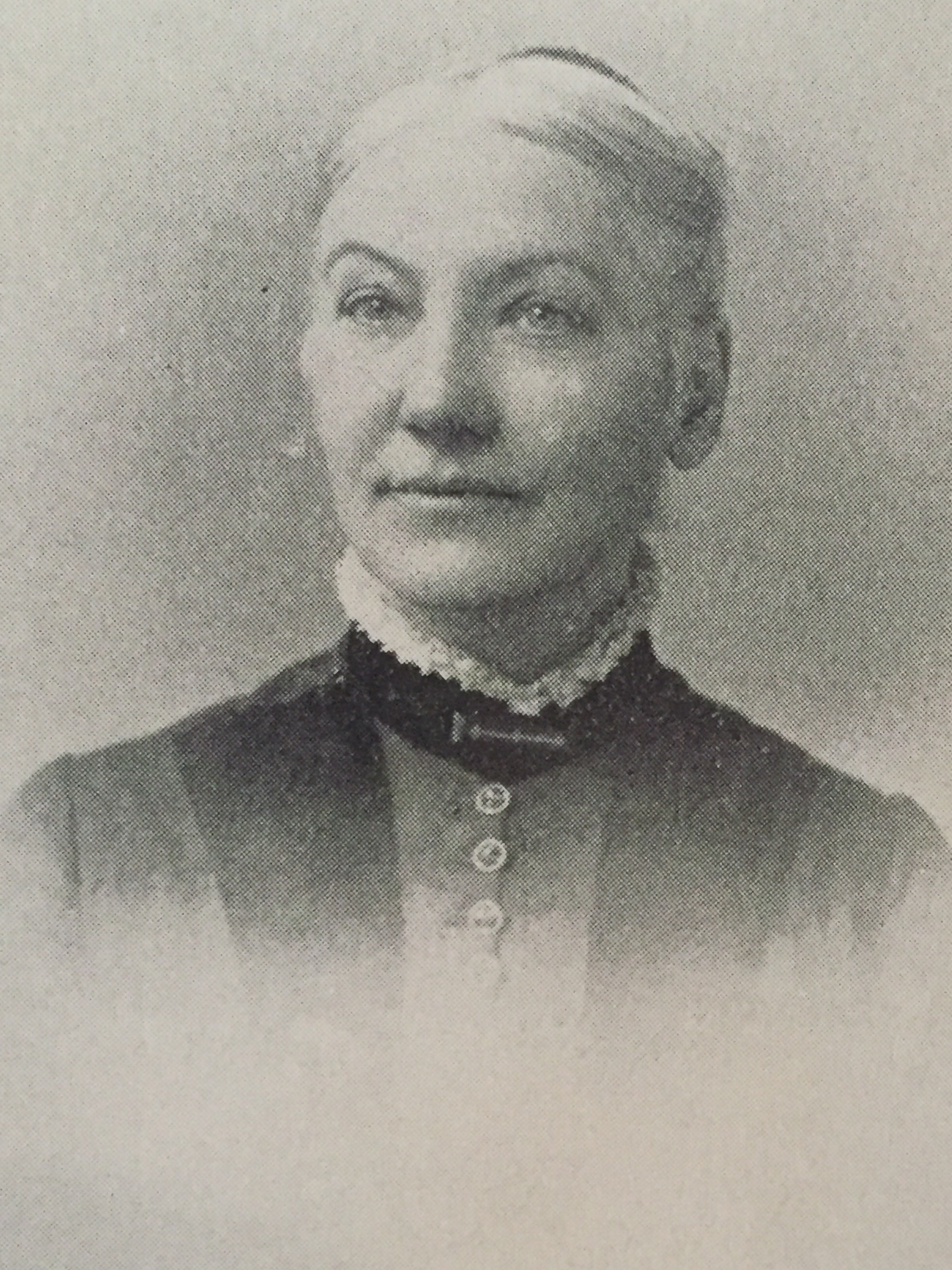
Hannah M. Underhill Isaac, A woman of the century

Hannah M. Underhill Isaac (September 27, 1833 - May 27, 1904) was an American evangelist.

== Early life ==
Hannah M. Underhill was born in Chappaqua, New York, on September 27, 1833. Her ancestors for many generations were members of the orthodox Friends Society in which her parents, Charles R. Underhill and Elizabeth Cornell Quinby, were members and elders.

Her education was received principally in the Friends' boarding schools in Dutchess County, New York, and Westtown Township, Pennsylvania.

== Career ==
For four years after leaving school Hannah M. Underhill taught in her native town, and later carried on a private school at home.

Hannah M. Underhill spent several winters with friends and relatives in New York City, where she entered society. During one of these winters, she gained a strong conviction. In the summer of 1861, she renounced the worldly life she had been leading. She was converted, and for some time that life satisfied her. Five years after conversion she received what she believed to be a call to preach the gospel. She was an invalid for three years, and on recovering her health she began to do evangelistic work.

For six years she was connected with Elizabeth Loder in mission work in the village of Cornwall, New York. Loder owned a chapel, and together these women worked to spread their faith. Sailors, boatmen and laborers went to their meetings, and many were converted. When the temperance crusade came, Underhill joined in the work of the Woman's Christian Temperance Union, entering a union in Brooklyn. In 1880 she organized a society in Cornwall, which was one of the most prominent of the local organizations in Orange County, New York.

== Personal life ==
Hannah M. Underhill married William Isaac, of Cornwall, in March, 1886.

She died on May 27, 1904, and is buried at Quaker Cemetery, Chappaqua.
