= Elizabeth Tipton Stanley =

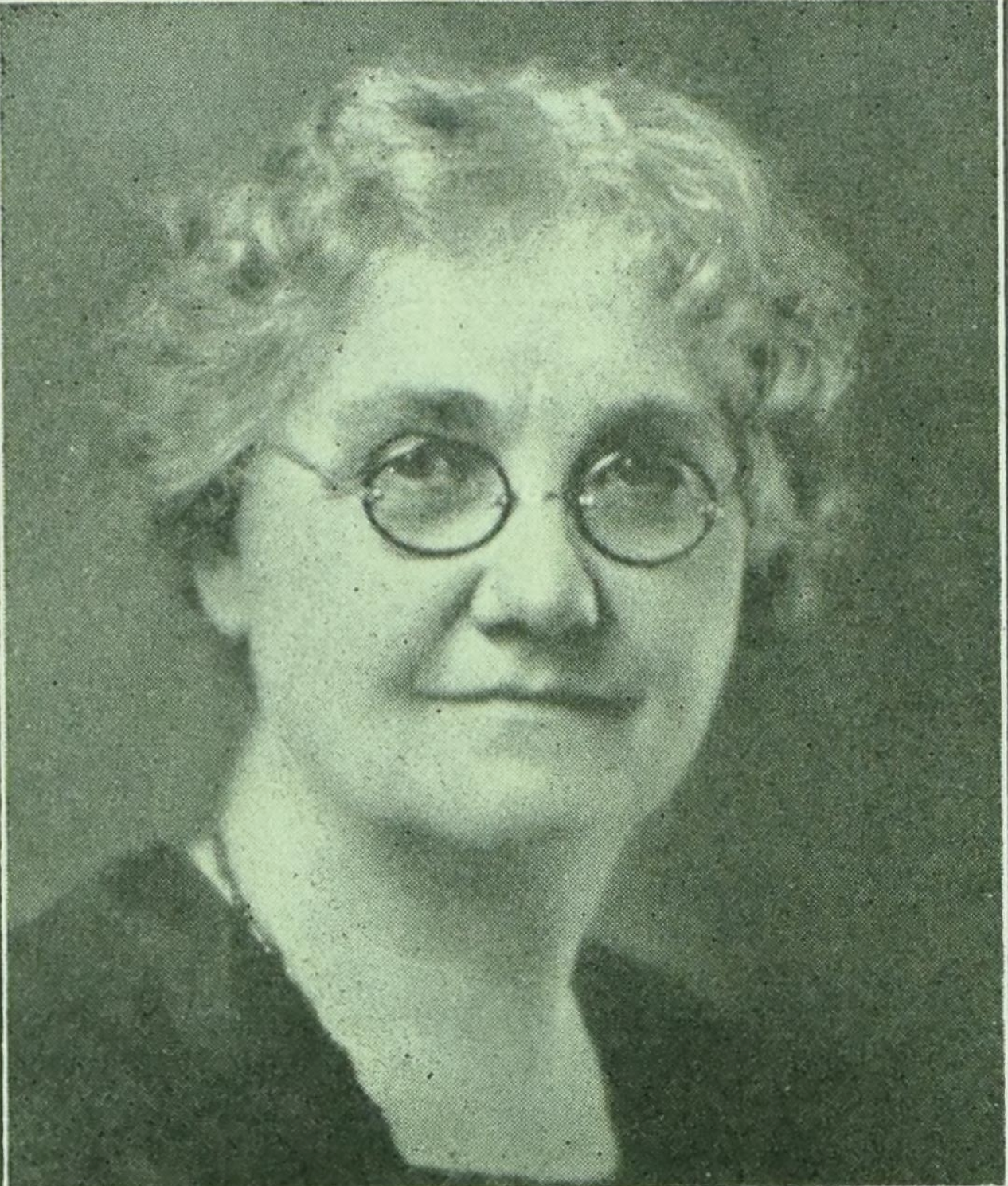
- Stanley in a 1930 publication.
- Born: Elizabeth Susan Tipton; November 15, 1883; Tuckaleechee, Blount County, Tennessee, U.S.
- Died: April 17, 1940 (aged 56); Liberty, Indiana, U.S.
- Occupations: educator; temperance reformer; suffragist
- Known for: President, Woman's Christian Temperance Union of Indiana
- Spouse: Zachary H. Stanley (m. 1883)
- Children: 4
- Relatives: John Tipton

Elizabeth Tipton Stanley (1858–1940) was an American educator, temperance reformer, and suffragist. Born in Tennessee, she taught in that state and in North Carolina. Stanley had a great desire to enter foreign missionary work but this was discouraged by her parents. Removing to Indiana, Stanley became involved in the temperance and suffrage movements. She served as President of the Woman's Christian Temperance Union (WCTU) of Indiana, and was the only woman who managed a Keeley Institute in her day.

== Early life and education ==
Susan Elizabeth Tipton was born at Tuckaleechee, Blount County, Tennessee, November 15, 1883. Her father was Col. J. W. H. Tipton. She was of English and German ancestry. Her paternal great-grandfather was William Tipton, who was one of Lord Culpeper's British company of soldiers who settled in Virginia at the close of the American Revolution. He and his descendants were historic characters in Virginia, Tennessee and Indiana. A brother of William, John Tipton, settled in Indiana and Tipton County, Indiana bears his name. Jacob, another brother, made his home in the Shenandoah Valley. John Tipton, son of William, settled early near Knoxville, Tennessee, where he had large estates. His son, Colonel J. W. H. Tipton, was born on the east Tennessee homestead and was educated for military life. He was a colonel in the Mexican–American War, fought at the Battle of Cerro Gordo and Vera Cruz, and was among the American forces that captured Antonio López de Santa Anna's carriage, treasury and wooden leg. On his return to civil life, he married Katrina Freschour, and was an extensive stock raiser and dealer until his death. His wife was a daughter of George Freschour, a son of Hans Freschour, the emigrant, who was born near Wurtemberg, Germany, and came to the U.S. about the latter part of the eighteenth century. He located in east Tennessee, where his descendants were numerous. Mrs. Stanley was the fifth of the eleven children of her parents.

Stanley's early life was passed among the mountains of east Tennessee. From childhood, she has been an active worker in Sunday school and church circles.

She was educated in the public schools of Tuckaleechee, and received a classical education at Maryville College. Stanley was educated with a view to work in the foreign mission field.

== Career ==
For several years, she taught in the mountain sections of Tennessee and North Carolina, including near Asheville, North Carolina, and serving as principal at the school in Black Mountain, North Carolina.

Around 1881, she had a great desire to enter foreign missionary work and was accepted by the Holston conference of the Southern Methodist Episcopal church and commissioned for that field, but her parents were so grieved at the thought of their daughter crossing the ocean for so long an absence that Stanley relinquished the plan.

About this time, in 1881, while on a visit to her parents at the old home, she met a young business man who was engaged in lumbering operations near their residence. The result of this meeting was her marriage on November 15, 1883, to Zachariah Harbin Stanley (1855–1835), of Liberty, Indiana, a son of Joseph and Jane (Moon) Stanley, and grandson of Zachariah Stanley, an early emigrant to Indiana.

Mr. Stanley was born in Harrison Township, Union County, Indiana, November 23, 1855, educated at Liberty High School, and for eight years was a popular teacher of Union County, Indiana. Mr. and Mrs. Stanley first made their home in Boston, Indiana, and both taught school for several years, after which Mr. Stanley became a dry-goods merchant at Liberty, which became the family home. In 1894, they purchased the Keeley Institute, that had been conducted at Liberty, but removed it to Richmond, Indiana where they worked until 1896, when they disposed of it to allow Mrs. Stanley time to devote herself to the education and care of their children. Removing to Liberty, Mr. Stanley engaged in the sale of agricultural implements.

After witnessing the harm caused by the liquor traffic, while in charge of the Keeley Institute, she decided to devote her life to the temperance movement. For about ten years, she was engaged in the suffrage movement and in temperance reform activities.

Stanley affiliated with the WCTU of Indiana, and organized unions in the northern and southern parts of Indiana. She filled every position in the WCTU of Indiana. She was the first president of the Union County, Indiana WCTU when it organized in 1891, and she organized the Willard Memorial Union of Franklin County, Indiana in 1898. On June 8, 1898, the temperance people of Franklin County organized a Loyal Temperance Legion, naming it Ross Stanley Legion, in honor of the young Stanley child who died.

For eighteen years, Stanley served as Vice-President of the Indiana W.C.T.U., and for ninetheen years, from 1920 to 1939, she served as Indiana State President. She spoke in the principal cities of Indiana and of practically all of the other States in the U.S., and she represented Indiana at many of the national and world conventions of the WCTU.

Stanley lectured on behalf of the WCTU. She spoke in every county in Indiana, and every state in the U.S., except two.

She was a director of Taylor University, and was represented on the extension force of Purdue University.

Stanley represented the Franklin County district at the national WCTU convention at Atlanta in 1891 and at the one held at Seattle in 1899. She was an official delegate from Indiana to the Fifteenth International Congress Against Alcoholism, held at Washington, D.C., in 1920, and to the International Convention of the World League Against Alcoholism, held at Toronto, Canada, in 1922.

== Personal life ==
The Stanley family had four children, Grace Tipton, Earl Norris, Zac J., and Ross Stanley.

Elizabeth Tipton Stanley died near Liberty, Indiana on April 17, 1940, at the age of 81.
