= Woodland Christian Church =

Church in Woodland, California

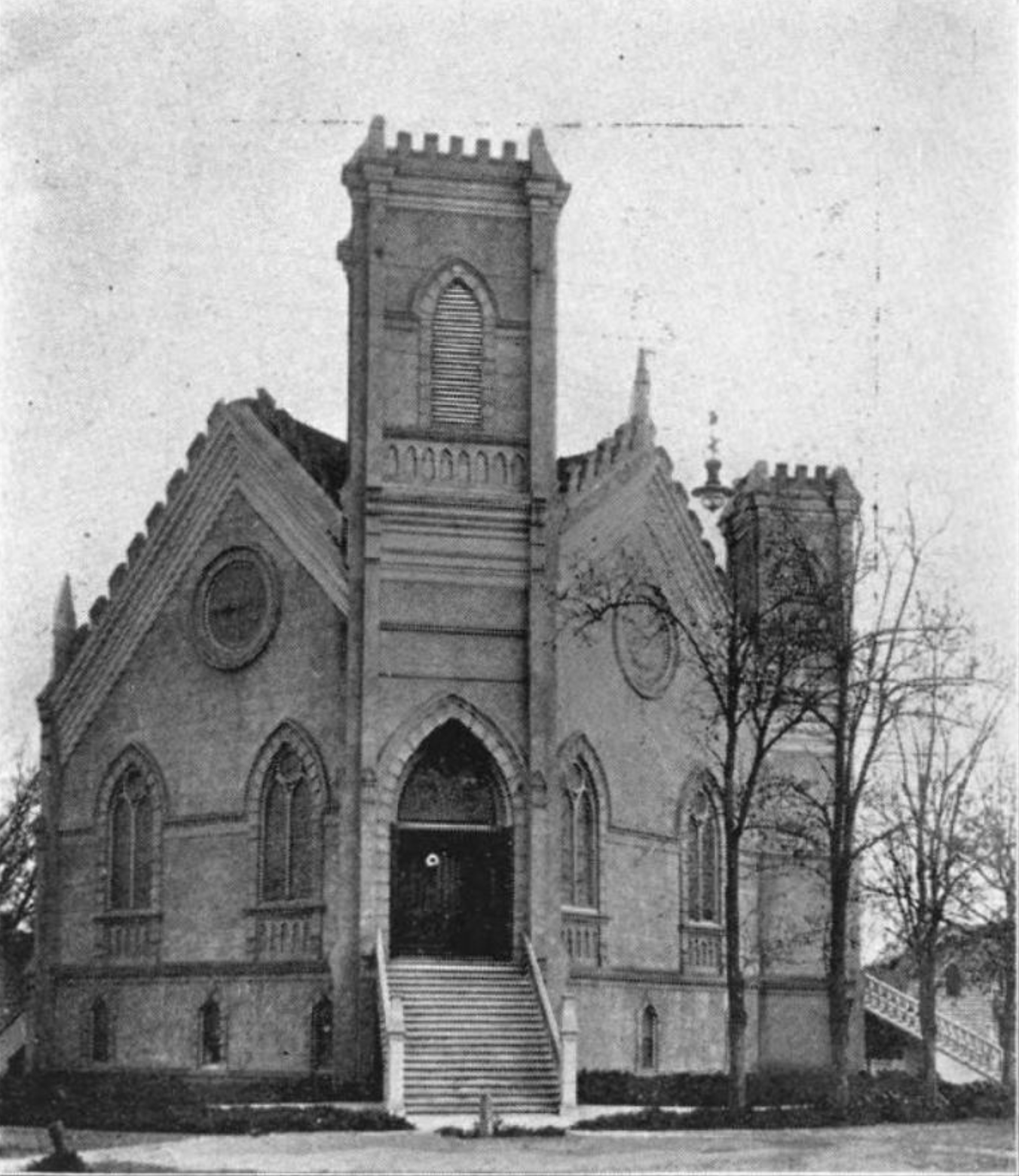
Woodland Christian Church (1916)

Woodland Christian Church is an American church in Woodland, California. Established in 1854, it was the first congregation of Christian Church (Disciples of Christ) organized in California. Hesperian College (now Chapman University) in Woodland was the Disciples' first school in the state.

The first meeting of Disciples in Yolo County, California was held at Cacheville, on Cache Creek, about 2 miles (3.2 km) from the present town of Woodland, in 1854. Joshua Lawson, father of J. D. and Bail Lawson, preached the sermon under oak trees. The next year, John Nixon Pendegast ("Uncle Pende"; 1812–1879) came and joined Lawson in a protracted meeting. There was a large in-gathering, and Lawson and "Pende" sent for "Father" Thomas Thompson, who came from Santa Clara, and the three proceeded to organize the "Cacheville Christian Church", in the spring of 1855.

The first school of the Disciples in the State was founded at Woodland: Hesperian College. After the founding of Hesperian College, the professors, Oscar Matthews, James M. Martin, J. W. Webb, and others served the church as Sunday preachers. Woodland Christian Church's first house of worship was a brick structure, erected on the college lot.

For years, Woodland was the center of California Discipledom. The second State Meeting was held there in 1856. It facilitated more State Meetings in subsequent years than any other locality in the State. A large influence spread from the Woodland Church with churches organized in the county at Winters, Capay, Madison, Knights Landing, and Dunnigan. Pendegast was the leading spirit of the church for years.

Later, W. H. Martin became the pastor, and remained with the church seven years. In 1887, J. L. Patterson was called to the pastorate, and during his service, an edifice was erected.

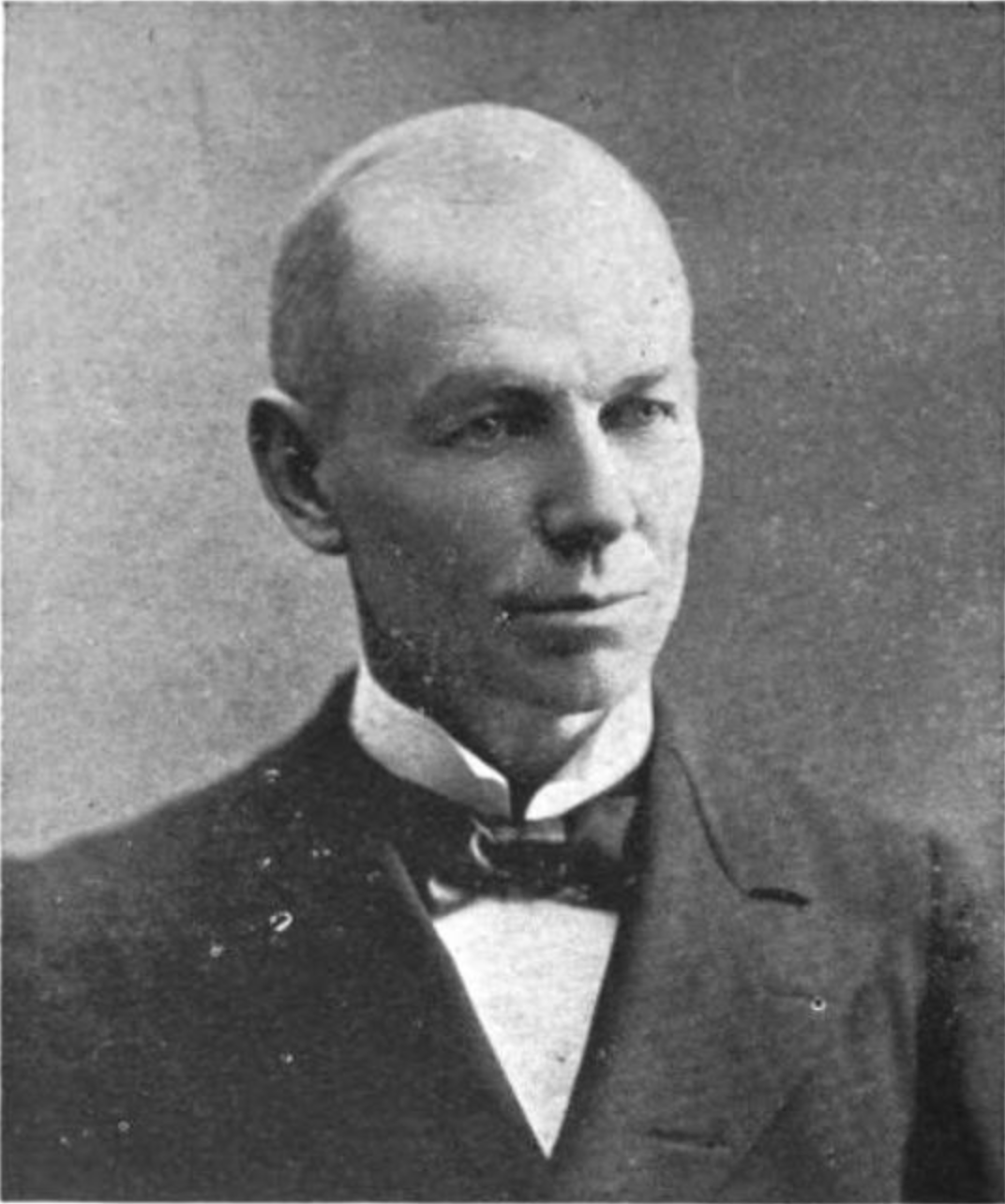
Gardner in 1916

In 1888, W. A. Gardner was called, and continued as pastor for nearly five years. During his administration, the church prospered greatly. E. T. Nesbit, later of Selma, was chosen as associate pastor. During Gardner's administration A. W. Foster held a large meeting, with more than 150 additions. Gardner was succeeded by David Wetzell; then came Matthew Small, a brother of James Small, and still later, W. E. Bobbitt, served as pastor.

In 1896, Gardner submitted a proposition that Berkeley Bible Seminary in Berkeley, California would pay all the floating debts standing against Hesperian College and the mortgage debt of the Woodland Christian Church.
