= M. Ella Whipple =

American physician

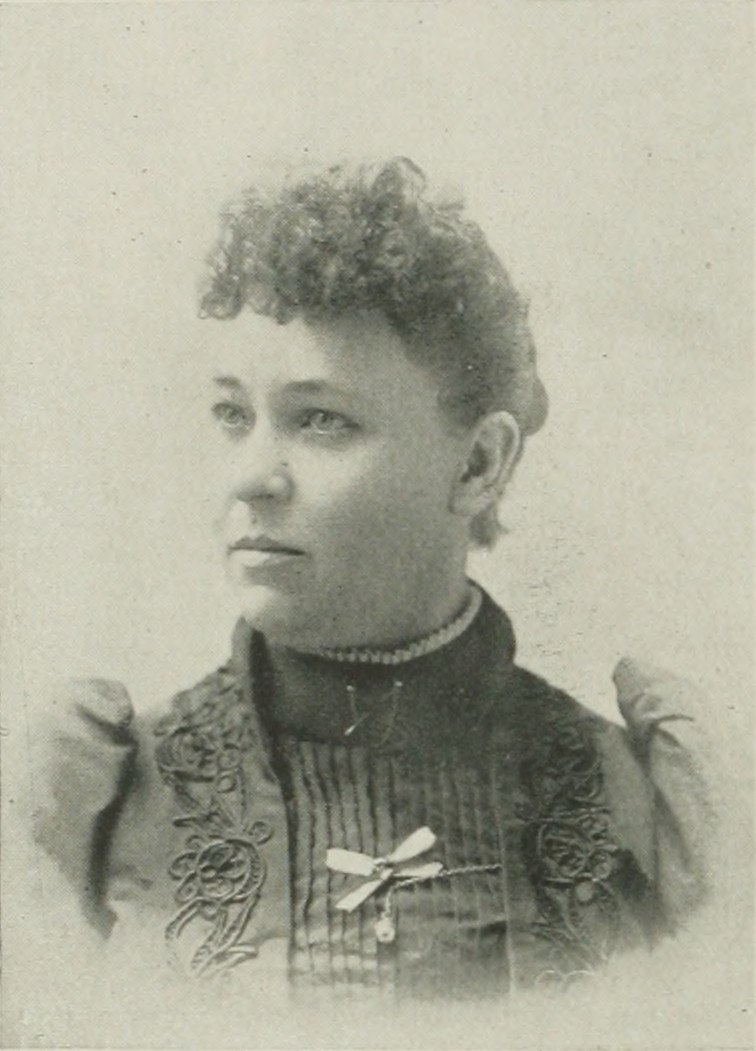
- "A Woman of the Century"
- Born: January 20, 1851; Batavia, Illinois
- Died: March 23, 1924 (aged 73); Los Angeles, California
- Education: Willamette University
- Occupation: Physician
- Spouse: John M. Marsh (m. 1826)

M. Ella Whipple (January 20, 1851 – March 23, 1924) was an American physician.

== Early life ==
Ella Whipple Marsh was born in Batavia, Illinois, on January 20, 1851. Her parents were both of English descent, her father being a lineal descendant of William Whipple who was one of the signers of the Declaration of Independence. Her father was born and raised in Chautauqua County, New York, and her mother was born in New Jersey and raised in Orange County, New York. They both moved to Illinois, where they were married. In 1852 they started across the plains by ox team to Oregon, being six months on the way.

Her mother was a teacher for many years and wrote for the papers of the day. Dr. Whipple's early childhood was spent on a farm. She was studious, industrious and persevering, and always at the head in school work. Her schooldays were spent in Vancouver, Washington, where her parents went to educate their children.

She was graduated in 1870 from Vancouver Seminary. Two years later she received the degree of B.S. from Willamette University, and had also completed the normal course in that institution.

== Career ==
The nine years following her B.S. were spent in teaching in the schools of Oregon and Washington, where she acquired the reputation of a very successful teacher. She was for two years preceptress of Baker City Academy, and later was principal of the Astoria public schools.

Deciding to prepare herself for the medical profession, she gave up teaching and, after a three-year course of study, was graduated with honors from the medical department of the Willamette University in 1883. She received the advantage of special study and hospital practice in the sanitarium in Battle Creek, Michigan. She was an active practitioner in Vancouver, until she moved to Pasadena, California, in 1888.

She was identified with the religious, temperance, philanthropic and educational interests of every place where she resided. For ten years before the granting of equal suffrage Dr Whipple was a stanch worker in the Women's Suffrage field and shared largely in the honors and benefits gained by suffrage in Washington. She was twice a delegate to the Clarke county Republican convention in 1884 and 1886, and twice a delegate to the Territorial Republican convention in the same year. In the first convention she was on the committee on resolutions, and in the second convention was chairman of the committee on platform. In the Clark county convention, in 1884, she was nominated for superintendent of public schools and was elected by a large majority, although there were three tickets in the field. She discharged the duties of her office in such a way as to win the respect and confidence of political opponents as well as friends.

She had at different times occupied every official position to which a layman is eligible in the Methodist Episcopal Church, of which she was an earnest member, being thrice a delegate to the lay electoral conferences of 1874 and 1878.

During her term as superintendent of public schools the Clarke County Normal Institute was organized.

She was active in Temperance movement, having been a Good Templar for many years and occupied nearly all the high and responsible positions in that order.

She was active in the Woman's Christian Temperance Union since the organization of Oregon and Washington, and again in California. She was called to responsible offices in the two latter States.

She was a thorough prohibitionist and was identified with that work in California. In 1890 she was the nominee on the Los Angeles county prohibition ticket for superintendent of public schools.

For a number of years she was a contributor to the press along the lines of suffrage, education and temperance.

Dr. Whipple was the inventor of a bath cabinet.

== Personal life ==
She married Rev. John M. Marsh (1826–1909). They lived for a number of years in Pasadena. In 1902 they moved to Los Angeles.

She died on March 23, 1924, and is buried at Sunnyside Cemetery & Long Beach Cemetery, Los Angeles.
