= Mary G. Hill =

American temperance activist & social reformer (1803-1884)

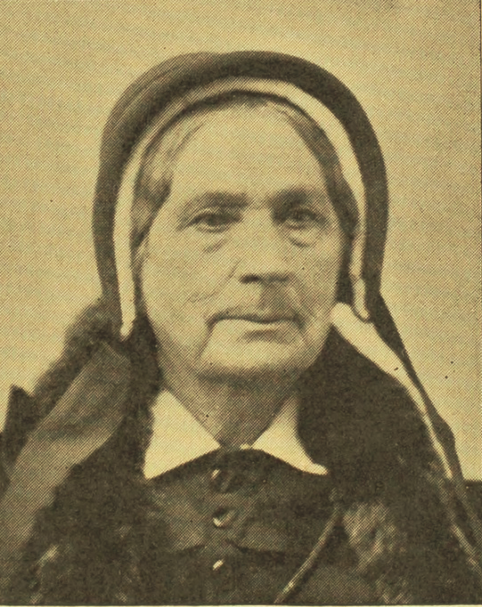
Mary G. Hill

Mary G. Hill (née Barnett; known as "Mother" Hill; March 6, 1803 – January 1884) was a 19th-century American temperance activist and social reformer as well as a religious worker. Because of her executive ability, she was esteemed and helpful in planning for the benevolent enterprises of her city. She served as president of the Ladies' Parsonage Association for twenty years, and of the first Woman's Christian Temperance Union (WCTU) of Newark, New Jersey (1874–1882), of which she became Honorary President for life. She was one of the organizers of the Female City Mission of the Methodist Episcopal church in Newark.

== Early life ==
Mary Gordon Barnett was born in Caldwell, New Jersey, March 6, 1803. She was of Huguenot and Scotch descent. Her father was David Barnett, whose father was one of the "Covenanters". At the age of 18, Hill was converted in Halsey Street Methodist Episcopal church, Newark, of which she was a devoted member for many years.

== Career ==
She married John Hill (born 1793) when she was 20 years old. She was the mother of ten children, including Emma Bourne. Though Mrs. Hill was responsible for domestic duties, and often in feeble health, she cultivated her naturally strong intellect by judicious reading.

In earlier days, her home was a hospitable place for itinerants. She was one of the organizers of the Female City Mission of the Methodist Episcopal church in Newark, from which sprung the Trinity Methodist Episcopal church, with which she united, and remained a member until her death.

She was President of the Ladies' Parsonage Association for 20 years. She was also instrumental in starting the mission out of which grew St. Luke's Methodist Episcopal church, and the Dashiell Memorial church. For many years, she was interested in the Orphan Asylum on High Street, opposite her residence.

Left a widow at the age of 70, she identified herself with the few women who met for nine months, previous to the organization of the Newark W.D.C.T.U. At their first election of officers, the first ballot resulted in a tie between Hill and Mary R. Denman. The latter withdrew in favor of Hill, who was thus made the first President of the first WCTU of Newark.

It was in this new field, the temperance movement, that she became notable. To take up the new and very great responsibilities, she did not resign or neglect her church work, her household cares, or ever cease to take an interest in other benevolent undertakings. She was soon recognized as an able leader in temperance reform, and known and beloved for her spirit, ability, and eloquence in pleading for truth, justice, and righteousness. Her voice in appealing to people and in prayer to God had power. As an organizer, she showed discrimination and tact in securing the right woman in every place, encouraging the timid, and holding a mild restraint upon those needing it. She was sought and welcomed as a speaker and counselor in surrounding towns and counties. She laid broad foundations which helped lay the establishment of the New Jersey WCTU.

Associated with HILL in the Newark Union during the first of her administration as president, were Mrs. F. W. Moores, to whom came the inspiration for a "Noontide tryst" for White ribboners, and Mrs. Rev. J. H. Knowles, whose sympathies always remained with the cause, but whose services for the Woman's Foreign Missionary Society of the Methodist Episcopal Church demanded most of her time. Hill's term of office continued by re-election from 1874 to 1882, when she resigned and was elected Honorary President for life.

In the summer of 1878, at the age of 75, she visited California, Oregon, and Washington Territory with her son, Rev. John B. Hill, who had charge of the Methodist Book Concern at San Francisco. In addition to addressing three temperance conferences on temperance, she took three days for a horseback ride to visit Yosemite.

== Death ==
Her funeral was held January 24, 1884.
