= Frances W. Graham =

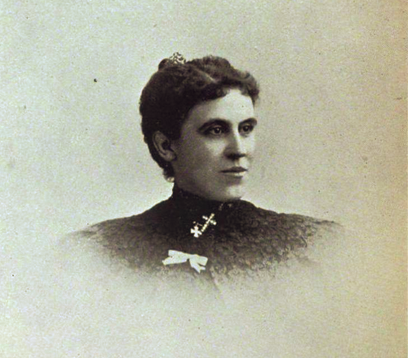
- Born: Frances W. Hamilton; September 1857; Lockport, New York, U.S.
- Died: August 19, 1940; Lockport
- Occupations: temperance activist; executive; musical director; historian
- Known for: President, New York State Woman's Christian Temperance Union
- Notable work: Two Decades: A History of the First Twenty Years' Work of the Woman's Christian Temperance Union of the State of New York
- Spouse: Almon Miller Graham (m. 1880; died 1927)

Frances W. Graham (née, Hamilton; 1857–1940) was an American temperance activist. She served as President of the New York State Woman's Christian Temperance Union (WCTU), and wrote two histories about the State organization. She also served as musical director of the National WCTU.

== Early life ==
Frances W. Hamilton was born in Lockport, New York, September 1857. Her parents were G Hamilton (b. 1834) and Francis Hamilton (b. 1839). Frances' siblings were Sarah, Mary, and Ludlowetblet.

== Career ==
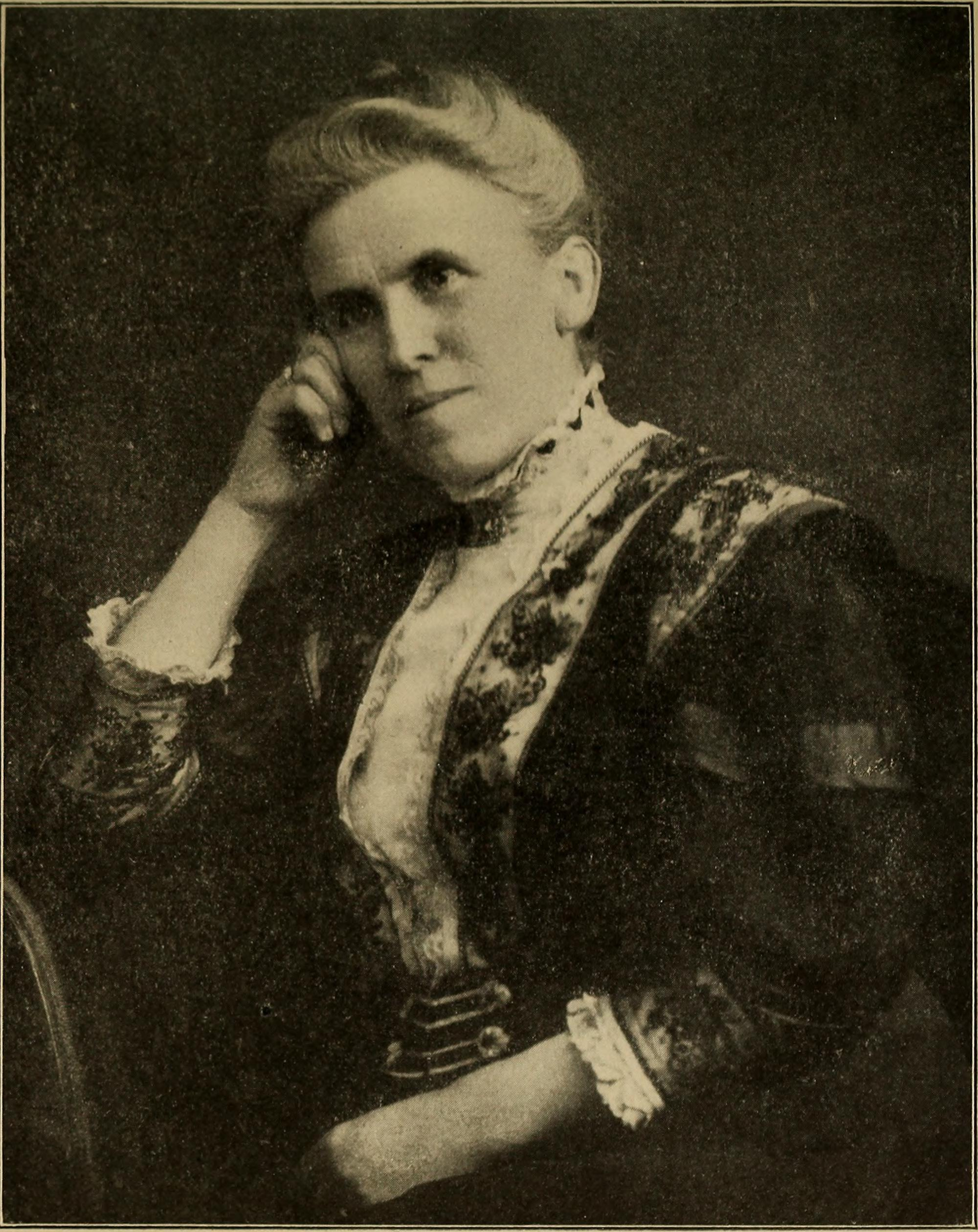
Portrait from The passing of the saloon (1908)

She became identified with temperance work as a child, first belonging to a juvenile society known as Cold Water Templars, and later becoming a member of the Sons of Temperance and Good Templars. She was also an active member of the Young People's Society of Christian Endeavour and the King's Daughters.

In 1880, she married Almon Miller Graham (1841–1927), whose help has made it possible for her to enter more fully into temperance work than she otherwise could have done. Graham served as corresponding secretary of the New York State WCTU. She was president of the Lockport WCTU four years, and corresponding secretary of the Niagara County WCTU for the same length of time. In December, 1890, she was appointed The Union Signal reporter for the New York State WCTU.

During Graham's tenure as the second President of the New York WCTU, the State membership reached 30,000.

She was an active member of the First Congregational Church of Lockport, where she sang as solo soprano for more than a decade. Her voice was that of a mezzo-soprano. At the state convention at Jamestown, New York in October 1894, she was musical director, and by vote of the convention, entered upon a service of song for the unions throughout the state.

== Later life ==
During the last two and half years of Graham's life, failing health forced her into retirement. She died at Lockport's City Hospital on August 19, 1940.

== Selected works ==
- Two Decades: A History of the First Twenty Years' Work of the Woman's Christian Temperance Union of the State of New York, with Georgeanna M. Gardenier, 1894
- Four Decades: a History of Forty Years' Work of the Woman's Christian Temperance Union of the State of New York, 1914
