= Lala Fay Watts =

American suffragette and temperance advocate

- Born: Lala Fay; December 23, 1881; Northfield, Massachusetts
- Died: November 8, 1971 (aged 89); Fort Worth, Texas
- Occupation: Activist
- Spouse: Claude De Van Watts
- Children: 2

Lala Fay Watts (1881–1971) was an American suffragette, temperance advocate, and labor activist. Born in Massachusetts, she spent most of her life in Texas where she led multiple organized reform efforts. She was Texas' first child welfare inspector and first chief of the women's division in the Texas Department of Labor.

== Early life ==
Lala Fay was born December 23, 1881, along with a twin sister, in Northfield, Massachusetts. Her parents were Frank F. Fay and Carrie Fay (née Ware). Her maternal grandmother was a Quaker. As a child, Fay and her twin sister marched in "Band of Hope" temperance parades. When Fay was a teenager, the family, which by then included a third daughter, moved from Massachusetts to San Antonio, Texas. She began calling herself Laura, which she felt was a more dignified name than Lala. Fay graduated from Sam Houston State Normal College and became a teacher. On August 18, 1902, Fay married Major Claude De Van Watts, a veteran of the Spanish–American War. The couple had two children, one boy and one girl.

== Activism ==
It was through being a mother that Watts became involved in activism. As a member of the Dallas Mothers Counsel, she asked the mayor of Dallas to put a woman on the welfare board. When he refused and suggested Watts go home and raise her family instead, she became an active suffragette.

From 1917 to 1919 Watts served as President of the Dallas Council of Mothers, a group affiliated with the Texas Congress of Mothers. She also served as the first President of Dallas' Parent-Teacher Association.

=== Labor reform ===
Watts was appointed Texas' first child welfare inspector in 1918. During World War I, child labor laws were not being strictly enforced due to the wartime labor shortage. Watts was one of a group of Children's Year activists who demanded a child welfare inspector be appointed in the state's Bureau of Labor and Statistics to rectify the problem. Texas Governor William P. Hobby agreed to appoint Watts to the position. Following her appointment, Watts moved from Dallas to Austin, Texas.

In 1919, Watts was named chief of the women's division of the Texas Department of Labor. To investigate conditions of factory workers first hand, Watts secured a job sewing overalls for a salary of $3. She joined the Garment workers union and worked in the factory until her boss discovered she was Mrs. Claude De Van Watts and fired her. Watts reported her findings back to the Texas Legislature and recommended a series of reforms for working women and children including a mother's pension, compulsory school attendance, increased sanitation, and rest periods. Her work led to the passage of 22 laws or amendments seeking to improve the working condition of women and children. In 1921, newly elected Governor Pat Morris Neff ended Watts' tenure in government.

=== Temperance ===
In the 1928 presidential election, Watts, then a leader of the Texas state Women's Christian Temperance Union (WCTU), was an ardent Herbert Hoover supporter. Republican Hoover was considered an acceptable "dry" candidate while the Democratic nominee Al Smith supported modifying prohibition laws. She spurred WCTU members to form Democratic Hoover clubs. She was elected state president of the WCTU in 1922, a position she would hold for 41 years.

Governor W. Lee O'Daniel nominated Watts to the state Liquor Control Board. The Senate did not confirm her to the position.

== Personal life ==
Watts had three grandchildren, two boys and a girl.

== Death ==
Watts died on November 8, 1971, in Fort Worth, Texas, after a long illness. She is buried at Oakwood Annex Cemetery in Austin.
