= Catherine Scott (librarian) =

Chief librarian for the National Air and Space Museum

- Born: 1927; Washington, D.C.
- Died: 2010 (aged 82–83); Washington, D.C.
- Alma mater: Catholic University of America
- Employer: National Air and Space Museum (1972–1992)
- Position held: librarian (1972–)

Catherine "Kitty" Scott (1927 - May 17, 2010) was the chief librarian and director for the Smithsonian's National Air and Space Museum. Scott served as the president of the Special Libraries Association from 1992 to 1993.

== Early life and education ==
Catherine D. Scott was born in 1927.

Scott attended St. Cecilia's Academy on the Hill in Washington, D.C. Her first part-time job was with the Library of Congress, where she worked as a high school student during World War II. She also spent summers working in the Poster Division of the Government Printing Office during the war.

During graduate school, she worked as an assistant librarian for the Export-Import Bank. Scott received her Master of Library Science from the Catholic University of America in 1955.

== Career ==
Scott held several government jobs, including at the library of the Department of Commerce and the Army Corps of Engineers Library. She started the library at the National Association of Home Builders, working for that association for seven years. She was the founder and chief of the Technology Library at Bellcomm Inc., a subsidiary of the AT&T Corporation. While at Bellcomm she worked closely on Project Apollo.

She joined the National Air and Space Museum as a librarian in 1972. At the time, the museum had a Historical Research Center but no official library; documents were stored in warehouses across the organization. Scott helped to plan and maintain an official library, for which she received the Superior Service Award from the Secretary of the Smithsonian.

Scott was appointed by President Nixon to serve on the U.S. National Commission on Libraries and Information Science (NCLIS) in July 1971. She served a full five-year term, through 1976. She was the only librarian on the commission in its first years.

In 1985, Scott published Aeronautics and Space Flight Collections, which is considered the second major bibliographical work on aerospace archives.

She was an active member of the Special Libraries Association (SLA), especially in its Aerospace Division and D.C. Chapter. Scott served as the president of the D.C. Chapter of SLA from 1971 to 192, and as the national president from 1992 to 1993. She was inducted into the SLA Hall of Fame in 1996.

== Personal life and death ==
Scott was a delegate to two national Republican conventions. In 1964, she was elected secretary to the Republican Platform Committee. She was also a member of the Capital Yacht Club.

Scott died at her home in Washington, D.C., on May 17, 2010.
