= Minnie E. Neal =

American photographer and temperance leader (1858–1945)

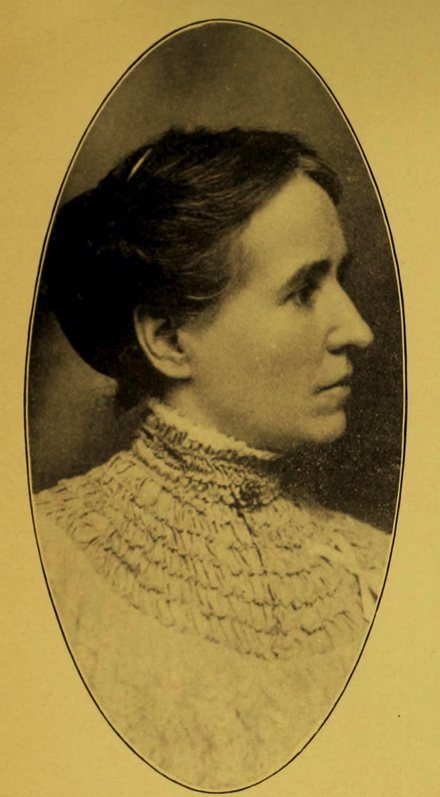
(1908)

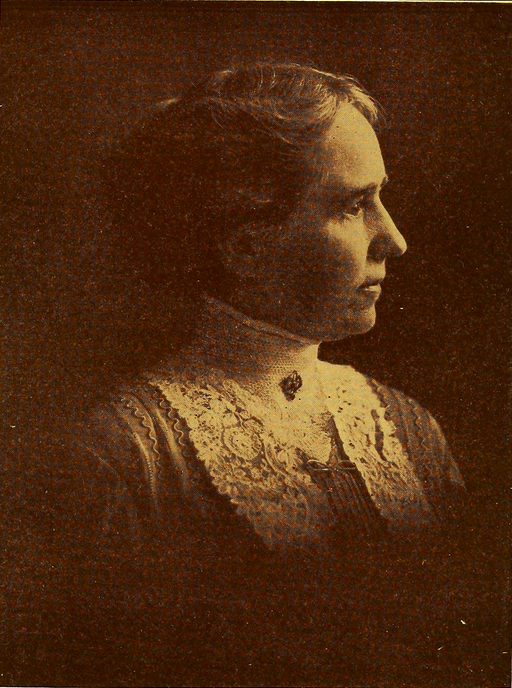
(1914)

Minnie E. Neal (1858–1945) was an American photographer and temperance leader. She served as President of the Florida State Woman's Christian Temperance Union (WCTU), and the first Treasurer of the Professional Photographers' Association of Florida.

== Early life and education ==
Minnie Elnora Neal was born at Gallipolis, Ohio. Her parents were John C. and Fannie R. (Farrand) Neal.

She was educated in the public schools of Terre Haute, Indiana, graduating from the high school in that city, and leading the class in general proficiency.

== Career ==
Neal enlisted early in the temperance cause. Moving to Florida, she was elected corresponding secretary of the Florida WCTU in 1893. In 1901, she became vice-president, and in 1904, was chosen president of that organization. At that time, there were but 35 Unions in the State, and about 600 members. Fourteen years later (1918), there were 175 Unions and a listed membership of 3,540.

Neal, although in business as a photographer in Jacksonville contrived to spend considerable time at Tallahassee each winter when the Legislature was in session. The better elements of the population learned to rely on her as a shrewd and successful promoter of reform legislation. Besides her temperance work, Neal was active in church and missionary movements; and, during World War I, took a leading part in the activities of the Florida Women's Committee of National Defense.

For several years, Neal served as secretary of the Florida Christian Endeavor Union and was the editor of its State paper. She was the Governor for Florida of the American Woman's Republic. Neal was a member of the American Woman's League, Chautauqua Literary and Scientific Circle, and the Equal Suffrage Club.

== Personal life ==
In religion, she was Presbyterian.

Minnie E. Neal died in Jacksonville, Florida, August 29, 1945.
