= Belle Caldwell Culbertson =

American author and philanthropist

- Born: Belle Caldwell; February 23, 1857; Wheeling, West Virginia
- Died: August 4, 1934 (aged 77)
- Education: State Normal School of West Virginia; Wheeling Female College
- Occupations: foreign missionary; home missionary; author; philanthropist
- Spouse: John Newton Culbertson (m. 1880)
- Children: 5
- Writing career
- Genres: periodical literature; translation

Belle Caldwell Culbertson (née, Caldwell; February 23, 1857 – August 4, 1934) was an American author and philanthropist, active in social and religious reforms. She served as president, Woman's Foreign Missionary Society of the Presbytery of Washington City; president, Woman's Inter-Denominational Missionary Union of the District of Columbia; and president, Washington Auxiliary Mission to Lepers. Other positions included: Trustee, Anti-Saloon League; Trustee, International Reform Bureau; vice-president, Mothers' Congress of D.C.; and member, Executive Board, Woman's Christian Temperance Union (W.C.T.U.).

== Early life and education ==
Belle Caldwell was born in Wheeling, West Virginia, February 23, 1857. Her parents were James Yarnall and Mary Travis (Newman) Caldwell Her siblings were: Theresa Caldwell, Harry B. Caldwell, George Newman Caldwell, Gertrude Caldwell, William Newman Caldwell, Harry B. Caldwell, and M. Belle Caldwell.

She was of Scotch-Irish and English Quaker descent. Her ancestor, James Caldwell, a Scotch Presbyterian, came to the U.S. from Ulster, County Tyrone, Ireland, in 1769. He was a defender of Fort Henry (now Wheeling, West Virginia), in which defense, out of 44 men in the fort, 24 were killed and 5 wounded. She was also a descendant of Honorable Francis Yarnall who emigrated from Worcestershire, England, in 1684, settled in Chester County, Pennsylvania, and in 1711, represented Chester County in the Provincial Legislature of Pennsylvania, 1744–48. John Jolliff Yarnall, a relative of Mrs. Culbertson, was Oliver Hazard Perry's first lieutenant in the Battle of Lake Erie, and for distinguished gallantry on that occasion, he was voted a sword by the legislatures of Pennsylvania and Virginia.

Culbertson was educated at the Female Seminary, Hollidaysburg, Pennsylvania. She was graduated from the State Normal School of West Virginia, in 1876. She was valedictorian of her class from the Wheeling Female College in 1877.

== Career ==
Culbertson taught in Wheeling Female College for one year. (Note: According to familysearch.org, in 1878, she married Hood Worthington (b. 1852) and a son was born in the same year.)

In 1879, she sailed for Indo-China as a missionary of the Presbyterian Board of Missions. For two years, she was principal of the Harriet House School for Girls in Bangkok, Siam.

On January 9, 1880, at the Embassy of the United States, Bangkok, she married Rev. John Newton Culbertson (1841-1935), Presbyterian minister, of the same Board of Missions. In 1881, owing to her health, they returned to the U.S.

From 1881 to 1887, Rev. and Mrs. Culbertson served as home missionaries at their own charges in the South Dakota region of the Dakota Territory, building up a flourishing church.

In 1887, Culbertson removed with her family to Washington, D.C. where she was active in works for the betterment of humanity. From 1897 to 1905, Culbertson served as the president of the Woman's Foreign Missionary Society of the Presbytery of Washington City. She personally organized many societies throughout the large field and under her leadership, the society raised an extra gift of US$5,000 for "The Washington City Memorial Hall", Tokyo, Japan.

Culbertson was especially active in efforts to promote interdenominational Christian unity. In 1906, she was chosen president of the Woman's Interdenominational Missionary Union of the District of Columbia. She also served as president, Woman's Foreign Missionary Society of the Presbytery of Washington City; vice-president, Mothers' Congress of D.C.; member, Executive Board, the Anti-Saloon League; and member, Executive Board, W.C.T.U. Culbertson was a member of the National Society of the Daughters of the American Revolution (D.A.R.).

She served as a correspondent for the religious press. She was also a translator of German fiction, notably, "Sunnyheart's Trial" (published December, 1910, in the Southern Observer) and "A Christmas Story for Children" (translated from the German of Emmy von Rhoden, which ran as a serial in the Lutheran Observer, 1910).

== Personal life ==
Rev. and Mrs. Culbertson had five children: Karen Whittier Culbertson (b. 1881), John Travis McVitty Culbertson (b. 1883), Helen Duncan Culbertson (1888–1889), Robert Caldwell Culbertson (1891–1894), and Gladys Isabel Culbertson (b. 1897).

In religion, she was a member of the Wallace Memorial United Presbyterian Church.

Belle Caldwell Culbertson died August 4, 1934.

== Selected works ==
=== Periodical literature ===
- "The Smallest Republic in the World", 1906
- "Work for the Slavic Immigrants in the Synod of Baltimore", 1906
- "The Schauffler Missionary Training School", 1907
- "The Open Door", 1907
- "The Pressing Need that the Gospel be Given to the Jews in the Yiddish Tongue", 1908

=== Translations ===
- "Sunnyheart's Trial" (1910)
- "A Christmas Story for Children" (1910)
