= Wheeling Female College =

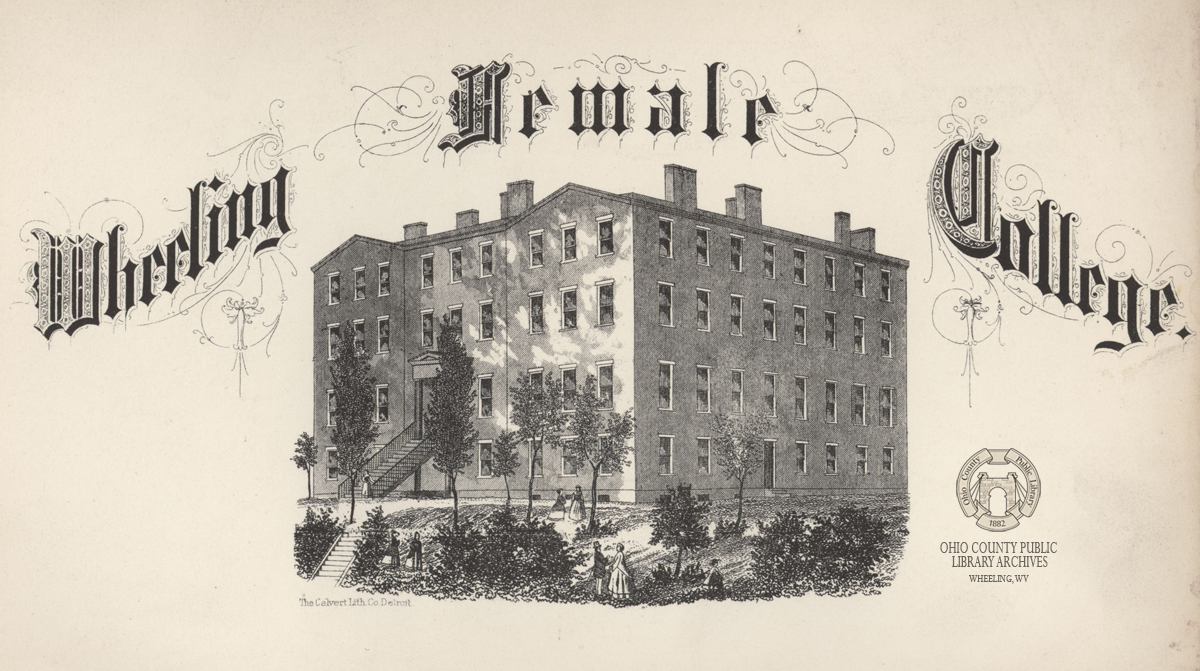

Location
- Wheeling, West Virginia; 40°3′37″N 80°43′19″W

Information
- Established: 1848
- Closed: 1891

Wheeling Female College was a school for women in Wheeling, West Virginia.

It was incorporated as Wheeling Female Seminary on January 24, 1848 by the Virginia General Assembly (Wheeling was part of the state of Virginia until 1863.) The school offered courses in academic subjects, music (including piano and guitar), and art (including painting and drawing). Its president was Samuel Ott and the largely female teachers were led by principal Sarah R. Hanna

The school closed in June 1865. A group purchased the school's assets and reopened the school in September as Wheeling Female College. The school offered a similar curriculum "to furnish first class instruction in all departments of education; in the elegant and artistic as well as the elementary and substantial". The school served Protestant women, positioning itself as an alternative to nearby Catholic schools like Mount de Chantal Visitation Academy at a time when there was significant anti-Catholic sentiment locally.

In January 1891, the College's president Rev. H.R. Blaisdell suddenly resigned, citing low pay and harsh local winters. The school closed permanently and was purchased by the Woman's Hospital Association, which opened the Wheeling City Hospital. The Hospital became the Ohio Valley General Hospital, then the Ohio Valley Medical Center, which closed in 2019.

== Notable people ==
- Belle Caldwell Culbertson (1857-1934), social leader
