= Gabrella Townley Stickney =

Gabrella Townley Stickney (1850–1942) was an American compositor, postmaster, and temperance advocate. She served as California State President of the Woman’s Christian Temperance Union (WCTU) from 1906 till 1908.

== Early life and education ==
Gabrella Townley Stickney was born in Chicago, Illinois, September 12, 1850.

She was educated in the public schools of Racine, Wisconsin.

== Career ==
In a newspaper office at Racine, she learned the mechanics of printing. In 1868, she returned to Chicago and was for ten years a compositor in the offices of the Western Rural, the Covenant, and the Legal News. In 1878, she removed to Collyer, Kansas, where she was for a number of years notary public and postmaster. Due to the influence of her mother, Mrs. Sarah Jane Stickney, who was a worker in the Women's Crusade in Chicago, Miss Stickney became affiliated with the WCTU and served for a time as president of the Collyer WCTU.

She later resided at Leavenworth, Kansas.

Removing to Morristown, New Jersey, in 1889, she was chosen corresponding secretary and press superintendent of the New Jersey Union.

In March 1891, she went to California, where, in 1892, she was president of the San Bernardino WCTU. In 1893, she was elected corresponding secretary of the Southern California Union, serving for seven years, after which she was made State superintendent of Christian Citizenship. In 1896, she served as editor of the Southern California White Ribbon, monthly temperance paper.

She was president of the Los Angeles County Union from 1903 to 1906, in which year she became president of the California WCTU. After two years, in this office she spent two years (1908–10) as lecturer and organizer for the National Union. For a number of years, she served in the same capacity for the California Union.

On May 3, 1919, she was elected president of the Central California WCTU, a position she held alongside others. Shortly after, on June 6, in poor health, she presided over the Central California WCTU for the last time.

Soon after, she started a new position at the Temperance Temple state headquarters, Los Angeles, as California state corresponding secretary, a position she occupied 26 years previously.

At the WCTU convention which met in Boston in 1919, Miss Stickney secured relics of the USS Constitution, which she presented to members of the Central Union.

In 1900, Miss Stickney represented Southern California at the National Convention of the Prohibition Party in Chicago, and was elected a member of the National Prohibition Committee, upon which she served until 1904. In 1912, she was a candidate on the Prohibition ticket for the California State Assembly, and in 1914, she ran for Secretary of State on the same ticket.

Since September 1926, Miss Stickney was secretary of the WCTU Home for Women in Los Angeles, formerly known as the "Southern California Home for Women and Children". In 1927, construction began on a new building for this institution, costing US$200,000. The home housed 100 women.

== Personal life ==
In religion, she belonged to the Lake Avenue Church, in Pasadena, California.

Stickney never married. For many years, Miss Mary E. Stewart was her companion.

== Death and legacy ==
Gabrella Townley Stickney died April 6, 1942, in Eagle Rock, California.

The Stickney WCTU, named in her honor, was organized in Pasadena, California, in April 1915 or April 1916.
