= Emma Bourne =

American temperance activist & social reformer (1846-1924)

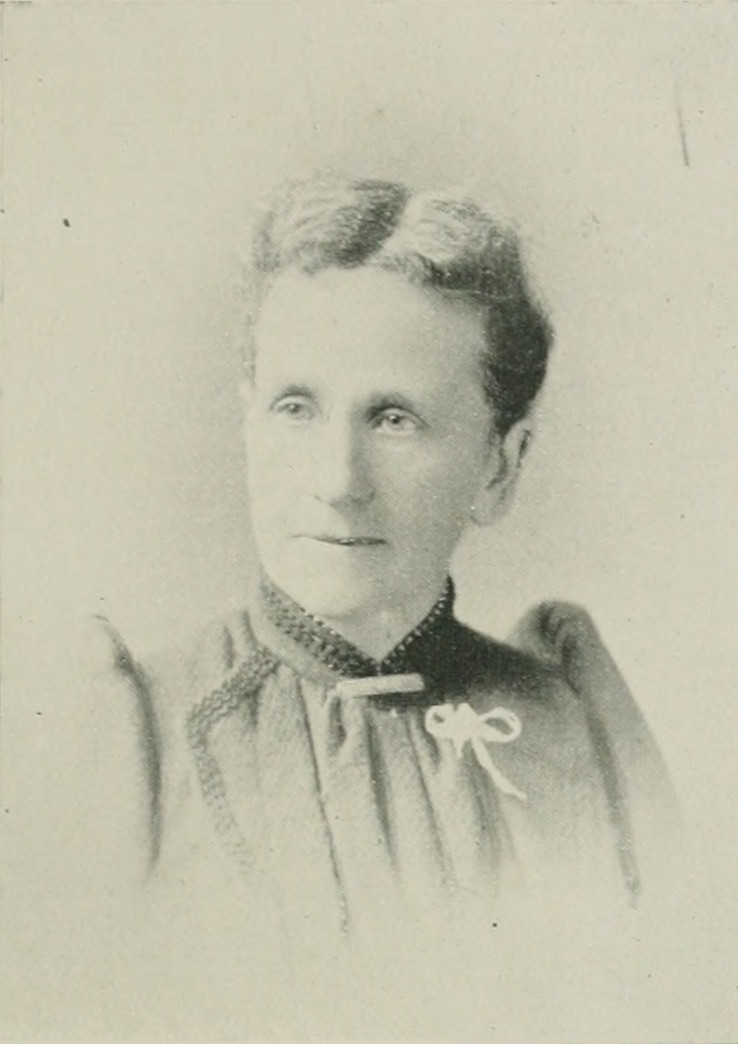
- Portrait from A Woman of the Century
- Born: Emma A. Hill; September 5, 1846; Newark, New Jersey, U.S.
- Died: October 5, 1924 (aged 78); Morristown, New Jersey, U.S.
- Occupation(s): Activist; social reformer
- Known for: President, New Jersey Woman's Christian Temperance Union
- Spouse: Henry James Bourne (m. 1868)
- Children: 4
- Parents: John Hill (father); Mary Gordon Barnett (mother)

Emma Bourne (September 5, 1846 – October 5, 1924) was an American temperance activist and social reformer. She was a teacher in the Newark Public Schools for seven years, and for ten years later, was engaged in the life insurance business. Her subsequent activities were devoted to the promotion of the temperance cause in connection with the Woman's Christian Temperance Union (WCTU). Since 1891, and for 19 years, she served as president of the New Jersey WCTU The New Jersey WCTU's organ, White Ribbon News was established in 1910 with Bourne serving as its editor.

== Early life and education ==
Emma A. Hill was born in Newark, New Jersey, on September 5, 1846. Her father, John Hill, was of English parentage. Her mother, Mary Gordon Barnett Hill, known among the temperance workers since the early days of the WCTU as "Mother Hill," was of Scotch-Huguenot ancestry. Mary was the first President of the first WCTU organization in New Jersey a local at Newark, in 1874 — continuing in that office for eight years. Bourne's grandmother was a Covenanter.

Bourne graduated from the Wesleyan Institute Newark and from the Newark Normal School (since renamed as Kean University).

== Career ==
After receiving her diploma, Bourne spent eight years as a teacher in the Newark schools.

From 1876 until at least 1893, she resided in her native city, actively engaged in church work, and prominently identified with the temperance movement of the age.

In the early days, Bourne sought to aid the temperance cause by the distribution of tracts; but the literature was expensive. She and Mrs. Campfield, who was associated with her, were obliged to pay US$3 per thousand for the leaflets. Believing that they could be profitably produced for US$1 per 1,000, they started a small publishing business, had their printing done by contracts with Newark printers, and supplied their literature to all interested in the cause in all parts of the state. This they continued to do until the establishment of the Woman's Temperance Publishing Association by the National WCTU Bourne served as editor of White Ribbon News (est. 1910) for the New Jersey WCTU.

The New Jersey state organization of the WCTU came into being in 1874, and Bourne served as the Recording Secretary for ten years. After the death of Sarah Jane Corson Downs (1822-1891), State president, Bourne was elected to fill the vacancy, a position she held for 19 years. While in the office, Bourne secured the free lecture service of Frances Willard, promised to the state having the largest membership gain. Willard's lecture was delivered in Jersey City, New Jersey, on May 11, 1897.

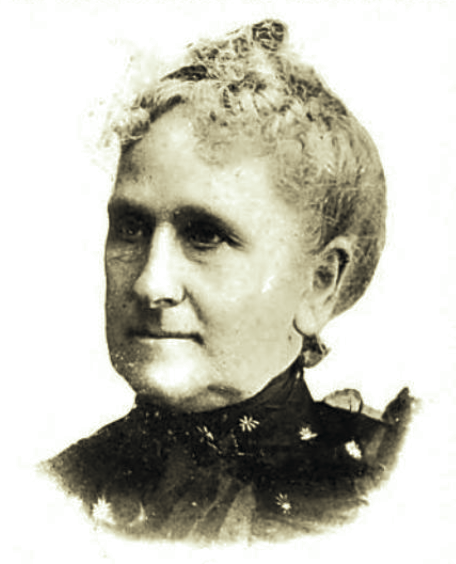
(1917)

During the administration of Bourne, the state WCTU was incorporated (in 1894). The Scientific Temperance Educational Law was passed in the same year with only one opposing vote, the first attempt in this direction having been made by the WCTU in 1885. The Union also participated in the popular uprising against gambling, race-track book-making, and lotteries led in after years by the Rev. Dr. Everett Kempshall, Pastor of the First Presbyterian Church of Elizabeth, and also in the movement for the framing of what was known as the "Bishops' Law" for the regulation of the sale of liquor in the state. In 1908 the State WCTU started with US$1,000, an endowment fund that gifts and bequests increased to US$2,364 by 1917.

For many years, she was an efficient superintendent of the infant department of her church Sunday school. In her public addresses, she made no attempt at oratory, but spoke from the heart in an unassuming, convincing manner.

== Personal life ==
She married Henry James Bourne, at Newark, January 13, 1868. He was the son of Jacob Bourne, of Ireland. Their children were: Mary Gordon Dexter, Elizabeth B. Dickinson, Amelia Barnett Kinsey, and John Hill Bourne.

After marriage, Mrs. Bourne went abroad with her husband three times, spending four abroad.

Emma Bourne died October 5, 1924, in Morristown, New Jersey, after two years of failing health. Interment was in Rosedale Cemetery in Orange, New Jersey.
