= Kate Scott (medical researcher) =

New Zealand medical academic

- Born: Kate Margaret Scott; 1960 (age 65–66)
- Education: University of Cambridge
- Scientific career
- Thesis: Mood congruent priming in subclinical depression. (1997)

Kate Margaret Scott (born 1960) is a New Zealand medical academic, and as of 2019 is a full professor at the University of Otago, Wellington.

== Academic career ==
After a 1997 PhD titled 'Mood congruent priming in subclinical depression' at the University of Cambridge, Scott moved to the University of Otago, rising to full professor.

Scott is a senior investigator with the World Mental Health survey initiative and much of her research uses the data from the surveys.

== Selected works ==
- Seedat, Soraya, Kate Margaret Scott, Matthias C. Angermeyer, Patricia Berglund, Evelyn J. Bromet, Traolach S. Brugha, Koen Demyttenaere et al. "Cross-national associations between gender and mental disorders in the World Health Organization World Mental Health Surveys." Archives of general psychiatry 66, no. 7 (2009): 785–795.
- Kessler, Ronald C., Patricia A. Berglund, Wai Tat Chiu, Anne C. Deitz, James I. Hudson, Victoria Shahly, Sergio Aguilar-Gaxiola et al. "The prevalence and correlates of binge eating disorder in the World Health Organization World Mental Health Surveys." Biological psychiatry 73, no. 9 (2013): 904–914.
- Scotton, Chris J., Julia L. Wilson, Kate Scott, Gordon Stamp, George D. Wilbanks, Simon Fricker, Gary Bridger, and Frances R. Balkwill. "Multiple actions of the chemokine CXCL12 on epithelial tumor cells in human ovarian cancer." Cancer research 62, no. 20 (2002): 5930–5938.
- Demyttenaere, Koen, Ronny Bruffaerts, Sing Lee, Jose Posada-Villa, Vivianne Kovess, Matthias C. Angermeyer, Daphna Levinson et al. "Mental disorders among persons with chronic back or neck pain: results from the World Mental Health Surveys." Pain 129, no. 3 (2007): 332–342.
- Scott, Kate M., Ronny Bruffaerts, Greg E. Simon, Jordi Alonso, Matthias Angermeyer, Giovanni de Girolamo, Koen Demyttenaere et al. "Obesity and mental disorders in the general population: results from the world mental health surveys." International journal of obesity 32, no. 1 (2008): 192.
- Scott, Kate M., Ronny Bruffaerts, A. Tsang, J. Ormel, J. Alonso, M. C. Angermeyer, C. Benjet et al. "Depression–anxiety relationships with chronic physical conditions: results from the World Mental Health Surveys." Journal of affective disorders 103, no. 1-3 (2007): 113–120.
