= Kate Parker Scott Boyd =

American journalist

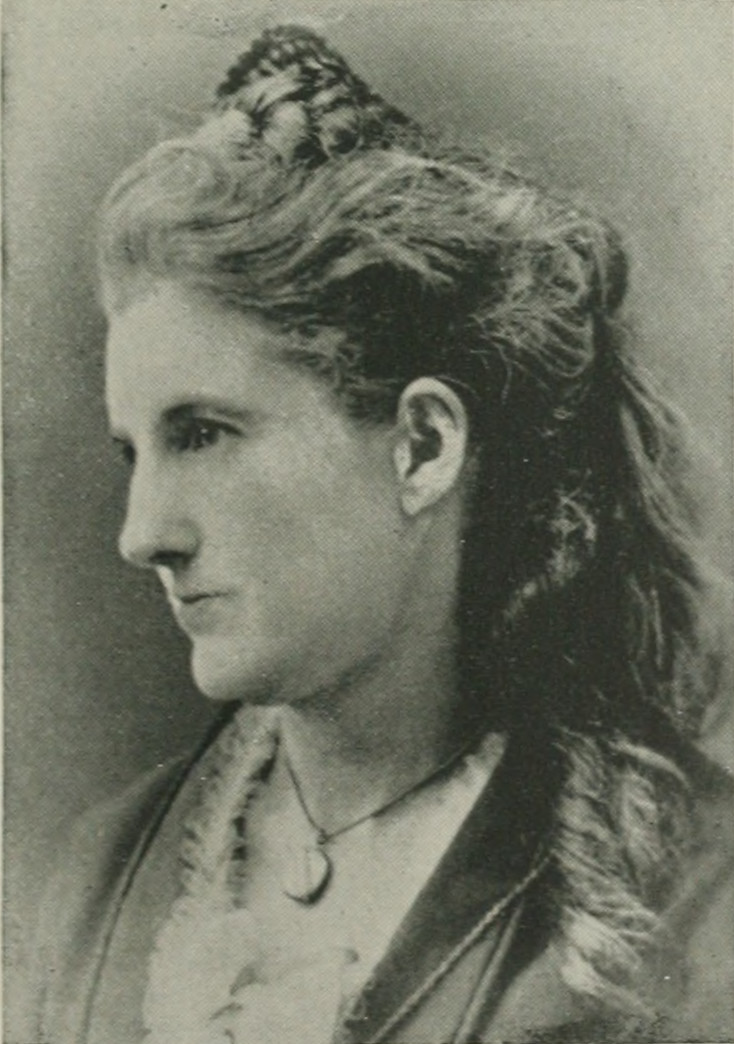
- Born: Kate Parker Scott; October 23, 1836; New York City, US
- Died: January 22, 1922 (aged 85); Berkeley, California, US
- Education: Flushing Female College
- Known for: illustrations
- Spouse: Rev. Nicholas Emery Boyd (m. 1862)
- Children: 2

Kate Parker Scott Boyd (née Kate Parker Scott; pen name, K. P. S. B.; October 23, 1836 - January 22, 1922) was a 19th-century American artist, journalist, and temperance worker from the U.S. state of New York. She won a number of medals and prizes in the Centennial Exposition of 1876.

== Early years and education ==
Kate Parker Scott was born in New York City, 23 October 1836. She was a daughter of Andrew Scott, of Flushing, New York, who was a son of Andrew Scott, born in Paisley, Scotland. She inherited her talent for drawing from her father, who was an amateur artist from his boyhood to his 19th year. Boyd attended the Flushing Female College, then in the charge of Rev. William Gilder.

== Career ==
After leaving school and traveling awhile, she was married in 1862 to Rev. Nicholas Emery Boyd. They lived in Portland, Maine, and in Canastota, New York. Their family consisted of two sons, who died at an early age. When circumstances made it necessary, Boyd was able to earn an income with her pencil. Her pictures were exhibited and sold in New York City and Brooklyn, where she was an exhibitor in both of their Academies of Design. She won a number of medals and prizes in the Centennial Exposition in Philadelphia, in 1876, and in various State and county exhibitions. The wife and husband moved to San Francisco, California, in 1877, and she was professionally successful there also. Boyd wrote and drew for The American Garden, New York, and for other periodicals, using the signature K. P. S. B.

Boyd was interested in reforms and humanitarian work in general, and was a member of the Society for the Prevention of Cruelty to Animals, of the Association for the Advancement of Women, and of the Pacific Coast Women's Press Association. She worked zealously for the sailors' branch of the Woman's Christian Temperance Union and for the Sailors' Lend-a-Hand Club.

== Private life ==
For many years the husband and wife were attendants of the Unitarian church at Berkeley. In his earlier years, the husband had been a minister in a New England parish. The service button that he always wore told of the membership he had earned in the Grand Army of the Republic. Boyd died at her home in Berkeley, California on January 22, 1922, aged 85, after a month of lingering illness.
