= Emma C. Laugenour =

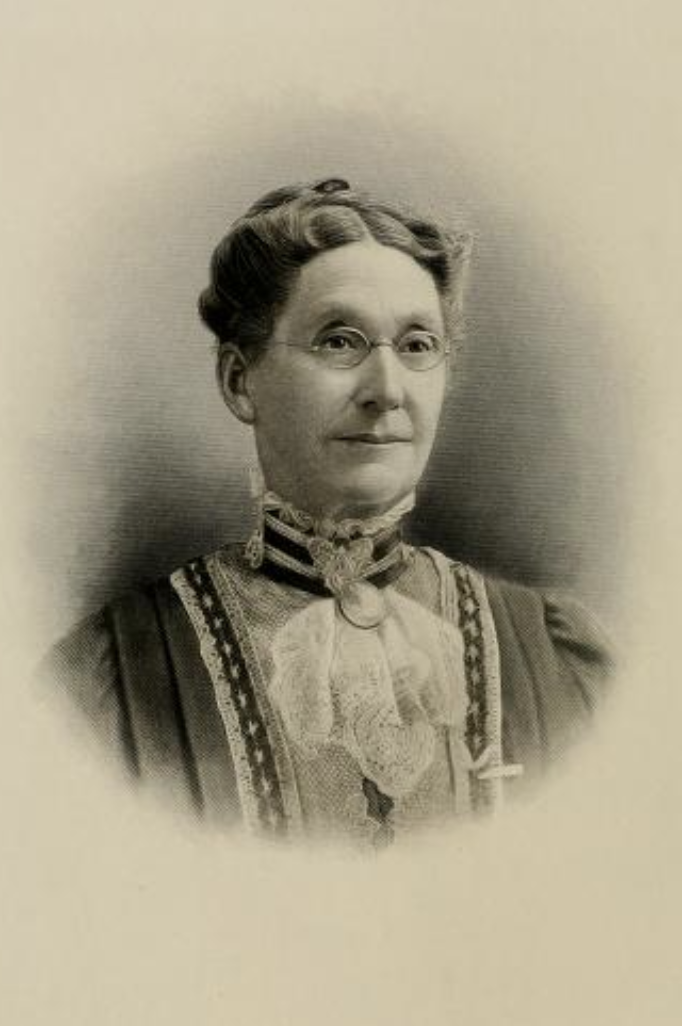
- Born: Emma Christene Watkins; May 12, 1842; New Philadelphia, Ohio, U.S.
- Died: May 27, 1919 (aged 77); Woodland, California, U.S.
- Occupations: philanthropist; social reformer
- Spouse: John D. Laugenour (m. 1860; died 1891)

Signature
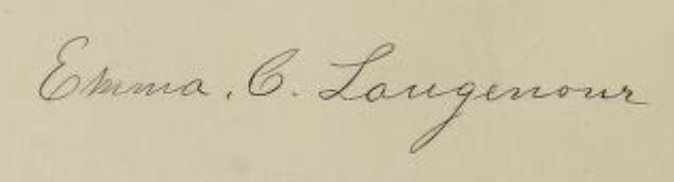

Emma C. Laugenour (née Watkins; 1842-1919) was an American philanthropist and social reformer associated with temperance and suffrage movements in northern California. She founded a newspaper and served as its benefactor. She served as president of the Mary's Cemetery Association (Yolo County) and the Woman's Christian Temperance Union (WCTU) of Woodland. Laugenour was a pioneer suffragist.

== Early life ==
Emma Christene Watkins was born in New Philadelphia, Ohio, May 12, 1842. Her father was Enos Watkins.

== Career ==
Since widowhood, she carried out philanthropy and business plans which she thought would have interested her husband.

Laugenour served as president of Woodland's WCTU, doing much to aid the temperance movement. She was the co-founder and principal financial backer of the Home Alliance, a paper devoted not only to the temperance movement, but to general news as well; it reached the rural districts. Many times, she bore the financial burden when necessary to further some project. She labored for twenty years to see the enfranchisement of women, having been the pioneer and the foremost worker in Yolo County in pushing the cause of women's suffrage.

In 1900, with Mary Morris, Laugenour raised funds for a replacement of Mary's Chapel, near Yolo after the original, smaller chapel had been destroyed in a fire. She did so in order for those who could not go to the city churches might have a place to worship, as well as to provide accommodations for funeral corteges from the outlying districts of Yolo county. She also organized the Mary's Cemetery Association, serving as president about fifteen years, and it was during this time that Mary's Chapel was built.

== Personal life ==
She married John D. Laugenour (1823-1891) in 1860. Of the eight children born to them, five reached adulthood: Philip T.. Henry W., Jesse D., William R., and Emma Carter, the wife of Walter F. Malcomb.

She made her home at Christene Cottage, First and Laurel Streets, Woodland, where she died on May 27, 1919.
