= Ida A. T. Arms =

American missionary-educator and temperance leader (1856–1931)

Ida Almira Taggard Arms
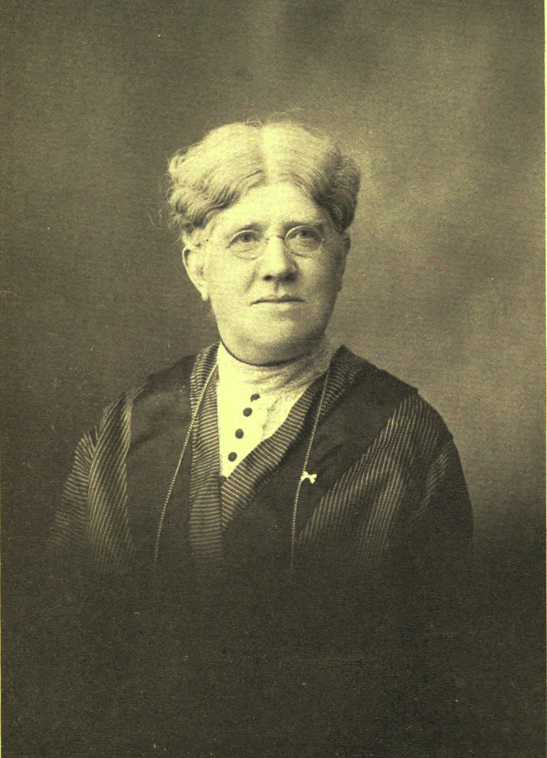
- Born: Ida Almira Taggard; August 27, 1856; Northfield, Vermont, U.S.
- Died: October 30, 1931 (aged 75); Tarpon Springs, Florida, U.S.
- Resting place: Elmwood Cemetery, Northfield, Vermont, U.S.
- Occupations: missionary-educator; temperance leader; translator
- Organizations: Methodist Episcopal Church; Concepción College; Woman's Christian Temperance Union
- Spouse: Goodsil F. Arms (m. 1883)

Ida A. T. Arms (née, Taggard; August 27, 1856 – October 30, 1931) was an American missionary-educator and temperance leader. She served as principal of Concepción College in Concepción, Chile and as president of the Woman's Christian Temperance Union (WCTU) in Chile. Arms translated a number of books from English to Spanish. Her biography was published posthumously.

== Early life and education ==
Ida Almira Taggard was born at Northfield, Vermont, August 27, 1856. Her parents were John Taggard and Olive (Harvey) Taggard. Five of Ida's younger siblings, Wallace, Henry, Ella, Tinnie and Franky died as young children. Her father died during the Civil War. Her mother died when Ida was eleven. Orphaned, she went to live with Rev. Ira Beard and his wife.

She was educated in the public schools of Northfield. At the age of 13, she entered the Montpelier Seminary. At the age of 14, Arms taught school at Topsham, Maine, and in 1871, she held a teaching position near Chicago, Illinois. Finally completing all the requirements, she graduated from the Seminary in 1875.

== Career ==
During the period of 1875-1883, Taggard was a teacher in various institutions.

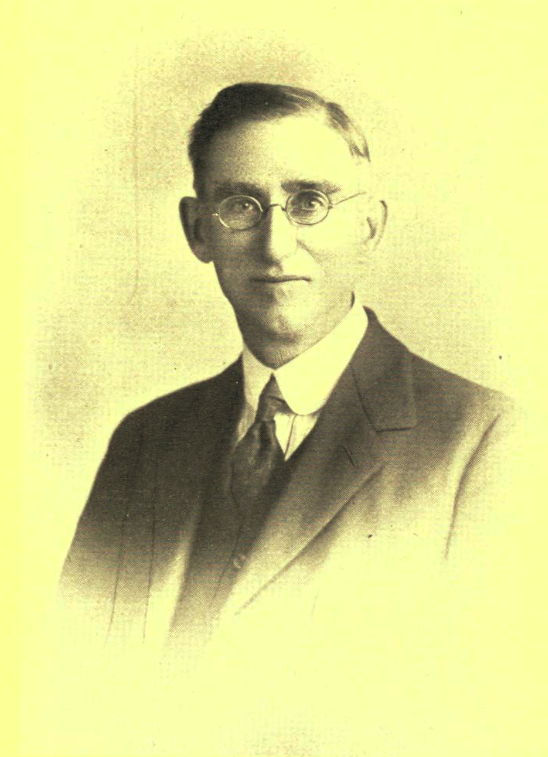
Goodsil Arms

On January 17, 1883, she married Rev. Goodsil F. Arms. They sailed to Chile, being under appointment as missionaries in the self-support" work of Bishop William Taylor of the Methodist Episcopal Church. They were stationed at Concepción, Chile where Arms served as lady principal of Concepción College (1888-1915).

In April 1894, Arms had to be taken to the hospital at Valparaiso, Chile for an operation. A later operation was required, necessitating a trip to New York City. After eight months, she was able to return to Chile and resume her work at Concepción College.

Active in the work of the WCTU during her career as a teacher in the U.S., Arms, on her removal to Chile, became president first of the English and then of the Spanish WCTU in that country. She was a delegate to the World’s WCTU Convention in Geneva, Switzerland, in 1903. After another visit to the U.S. in 1915, to regain her health, she resumed missionary and temperance work in Chile the following year, with a change of location to Coquimbo.

Later, Arms translated a number of English language books into Spanish.

== Death and legacy ==
Arms died at her home in Tarpon Springs, Florida on October 30, 1931. She was buried at Elmwood Cemetery in Northfield. A biography, A life in His presence; the life and letters of Mrs. Ida A.T. Arms was compiled and published in 1933 by Bessie C. Howland.

== Selected works ==
- A life in His presence; the life and letters of Mrs. Ida A.T. Arms (1933) (Text)
