= Michigan Woman's Press Association =

Michigan Woman's Press Association (MWPA) was an American professional association for women writers and journalists in Michigan. Founded in 1890, it was active until shortly before World War I, though there was an unsuccessful attempt to revive activity in the late 1930s.

== Foundation ==
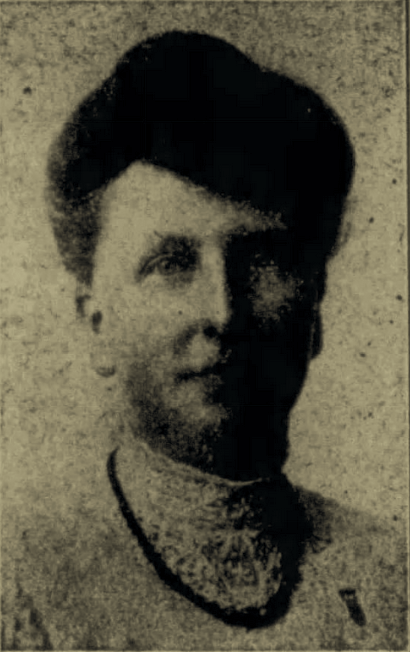
Carrie E. Bassett

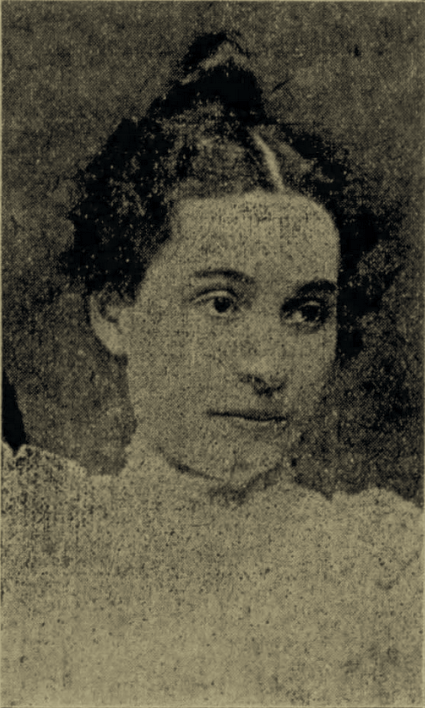
Grace Greenwood Browne

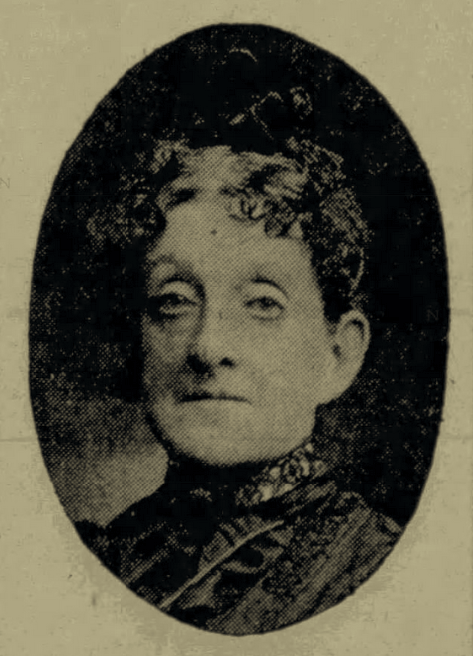
Sarah J. La Tour

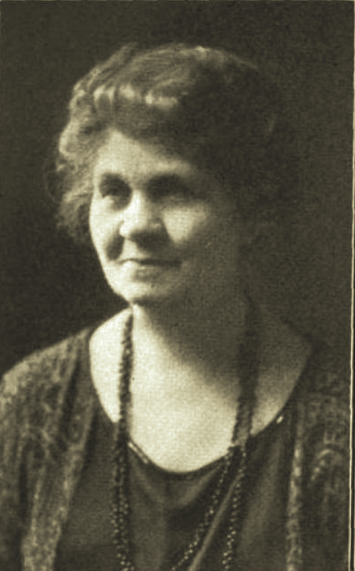
Kate E. Ward

After 30 years of continued service in active journalism, M. E. C. Bates, of the Grand Traverse Herald, became convinced that many benefits would accrue to the women workers of the state press by being organized as a state association. Cooperation was assured her by several of the less experienced, but equally enthusiastic staff members of other papers, and, after correspondence and agitation incident to such a project, pledges were secured to warrant a venture. As the work progressed, the promoters were surprised to find, all over the state, earnest, capable women, editing departments, doing reporting work, compiling news or helping their husbands in all-around newspaper work. Several, even, were found who owned and edited their papers, having come into possession of the business by inheritance or force of circumstances, and when the list was made up and the meeting for organization perfected at Traverse City, Michigan, July 22, 1890, twenty-seven names were enrolled as charter members.

So soon as it was definitely announced that the first meeting would be held at Traverse City, Thomas T. Bates, of the Grand Traverse Herald, and E. L. Sprague of the Traverse Bay Eagle, two of the most veteran newspaper men in the state, and both of whom had been prominently identified with the state press for nearly thirty years, came forward and tendered the women free printing of programmes, free notices, free circulars, anything and everything that came within the jurisdiction of printers' ink. Their generosity was infectious and was quickly supplemented with an offer from the Hon. Perry Hannah to entertain the visiting press women at his own board, the Park Place Hotel. Then the Ladies Library Association freely opened their parlors for the meetings, and thus, the first and most difficult arrangements were quickly handled. The first president of the association was Mrs. Frank Howard, member of the editorial staff of the Detroit Tribune.

The other officers of the association elected the first year were: Vice-President, M. E. C. Bates, Grand Traverse Herald; recording secretary, Claudia Quigley Murphy, Grand Rapids Democrat; corresponding secretary, S. Isadore Miner, Good Health; treasurer, Belle M. Perry, Charlotte Tribune; executive committee, Sarah J. LaTour, American Tyler; Hattie C. Sleeper, Port Huron Times; and Eva C. Doughty, Gladwin Leader.

== Activities ==
In 1894, Lucinda Hinsdale Stone was the honorary president of the Michigan Woman's Press Association.

The officers in 1913 were: Honorary President, Ella Eaton Kellogg; President, Pruella Janet Sherman; Vice-presidents, Jennie Buell and Mrs. J. E. St. John; recording secretary, Ola M. Johnson; corresponding secretary, Julia Ball; treasurer, Emma E. Bower; historian, Lucy A. Leggett; directors, Carrie E. Bassett, Bella M. Perry, Florence M. Brooks, Kate E. Ward.

== Notable people ==
- Julia Ball
- Carrie E. Bassett
- Clara Nettie Bates
- M. E. C. Bates
- Emma E. Bower
- Florence M. Brooks
- Grace Greenwood Browne
- Mary K. Buck
- Jennie Buell
- Ethlyn T. Clough
- Eva C. Doughty
- Mrs. Frank Howard
- Ola M. Johnson
- Ella Eaton Kellogg
- Sarah J. La Tour
- Lucy A. Leggett
- Claudia Quigley Murphy
- Pauline Periwinkle (S. Isadore Miner)
- Belle M. Perry
- Martha Louise Rayne
- Emma L. Shaw
- Pruella Janet Sherman
- Hattie C. Sleeper
- Jennie O. Starkey
- Lucinda Hinsdale Stone
- Kate E. Ward
