= Eva C. Doughty =

American journalist

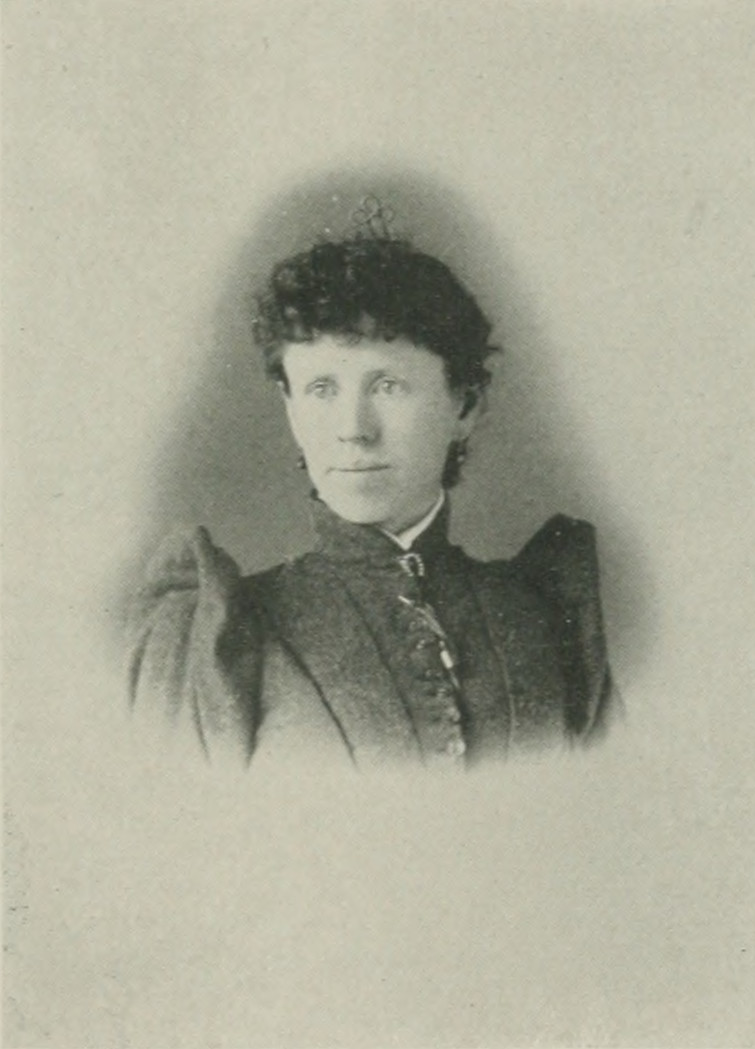
- Photo in A Woman of the Century
- Born: Eva Craig Graves; December 1, 1852; Warsaw, Kentucky, U.S.
- Died: November 4, 1929 (aged 76); Washington, D.C., U.S.
- Resting place: Riverside Cemetery, Mount Pleasant, Michigan, U.S.
- Education: Oxford Female College
- Occupations: journalist; newspaper editor; suffragist; organizational founder
- Spouse: John R. Doughty (m. 1874)
- Children: 3
- Writing career
- Language: English

Eva C. Doughty (née, Graves; December 1, 1852 – November 4, 1929) was an American journalist, newspaper editor, and suffragist. She was the co-founder of the Michigan Woman's Press Association and the Mt. Pleasant Library, Literary and Musical Association. She served as president of the Grand Rapids Equal Suffrage Association.

== Early life and education ==
Eva Craig Graves was born in Warsaw, Kentucky, December 1, 1852. Her father, Judge Lorenzo Graves, was a politician and lawyer. Her mother was Virginia Hampton-Graves.

Doughty was educated in Oxford Female College, Oxford, Ohio, leaving her Kentucky home during the civil war years from 1860 to 1864, which years she passed in the college with her two other sisters. Prior to that, she had been taught by private tutors. After a four-year course in Oxford, she entered the Academy of the Most Holy Rosary, in Louisville, Kentucky, conducted by sisters of the Dominican Order, where she studied nearly three years, and left just two months before she would have been graduated, to accompany a sister, whose husband was in the regular army, to a frontier post.

== Career ==
On May 24, 1874, she married John R. Doughty, then editor and proprietor of the Mount Pleasant, Michigan, Enterprise. She was at once installed as associate editor with her husband. She did regular newspaper work on that paper for fourteen years, keeping the office hours and doing anything connected with the office work, from proof-reading and type-setting to writing for any department of the paper where "copy" was called for. Subsequently, Mr. Doughty sold the Enterprise and for three years engaged in business in Grand Rapids, Michigan, where the family removed.

There, Doughty engaged in public work. Doughty, Etta S. Wilson, of the Telegram-Herald, and Mrs Fleming (later connconnected with the Gladwin Leader), held the first meeting and planned the organization of the Michigan Woman's Press Association (M.W.P.A.). The M.W.P.A. was organized at Traverse City, Michigan in July 1890 with 27 charter members, which included Doughty, and in the ensuing officer elections, Doughty was elected to the Executive committee. She was elected president of the Grand Rapids Equal Suffrage Association, which position she resigned when the family removed to Gladwin, Michigan.

In 1890, the husband commenced the publication of the Gladwin Leader, being the founder and owner of the plant. The wife was regularly engaged on that paper. In addition to editing the paper, she read proofs, set type, and could run a printing job, and for these reasons, she deserved a large share of credit for the success of the Gladwin Leader. Having sold the Gladwin Gladwin Leader in January 1892, the husband and wife bought the Post, of Port Austin, Michigan, in May of the same year, where she was engaged daily as assistant editor of that paper.

In addition to general newspaper work, she served as special correspondent of several city daily papers and was for some time a contributor to the Sunny South, writing short stories, sketches and an occasional poem.

In August 1892, the M.W.P.A. made plans for several papers to be included at the upcoming World's Columbian Exposition (1893, Chicago) with Doughty taking on, "Women as Engineers, Pilots, Lighthouse Keepers, etc." In May 1893, she presented a paper at the annual convention of the Huron County Sunday School Association.

== Affiliations ==
Doughty was an active member of the Woman's Christian Temperance Union (WCTU), serving as secretary of the Eighth Congressional District for four years. She belonged to the Good Templars, the Royal Templars, and the Golden Rod Lodge, Daughters of Rebekah. Doughty was a member of the Michigan Historical Society, and for several years, she was the secretary of the Mt. Pleasant Library, Literary and Musical Association, an organization of which she was one of the founders. In July 1896, she was appointed to the committee on credentials of the Ladies of the Maccabees (L. O. T. M.) of Michigan.

== Personal life ==
In religion, Doughty engaged in Sunday-school work and was a member of the Presbyterian Church. She had three children, two sons (Lorenzo G. and Ole W.) and a daughter (Virgaline). She died in Washington, D.C., November 4, 1929. Interment was at Riverside Cemetery, Mount Pleasant, Michigan.
