= Jennie O. Starkey =

American journalist

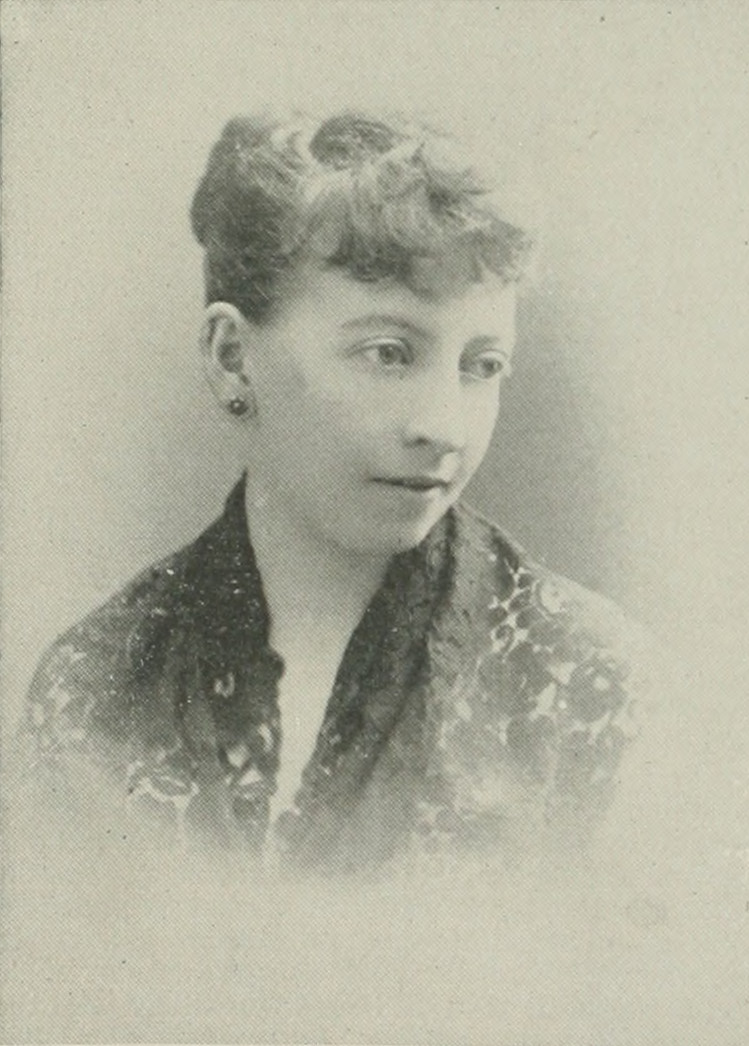
- Photo in A Woman of the Century
- Born: ca. 1856 Detroit, Michigan, U.S.
- Died: October 21, 1918 Detroit
- Occupation: journalist; newspaper editor
- Employer: Detroit Free Press

Jennie O. Starkey (ca. 1856 – October 21, 1918) was an American journalist and newspaper editor, the first woman in Detroit to adopt journalism as a profession. As a staff member of the Detroit Free Press, she managed "The Puzzler" department before serving as editor of "The Household", "Fair Woman's World", "The Letter-Box", and "The Sunday Breakfast-Table" departments. She was a member of the board of directors of the Michigan Authors' Association, a charter member of the Michigan Woman's Press Association, and president of the Michigan Woman's Press Club.

== Early life and education ==
Jennie O. Starkey was born in Detroit, Michigan, ca. 1856. (Note: According to Willard & Livermore (1893), Jennie was born July 29, 1863.) She was the youngest daughter of Ellen Jane Taylor (Hittell) and Henry Mitchell Starkey, of Detroit. Her father was a journalist and prominent in municipal affairs. In 1855, he became the city editor of the Detroit Free Press, taking over the position from his brother, Richard. Jennie's siblings were Mary (b. 1854) and Harry (b. 1858).

She graduated from Detroit high school.

== Career ==
In April 1878, before her graduation from the Detroit high school, she joined the staff of the Detroit Free Press, taking under her control the department known as "The Puzzler". Her abilities outgrew that department, and she was soon made editor of a department known as "The Household", later of "Fair Woman's World", "The Letter-Box", and "The Sunday Breakfast-Table". Her duties became so onerous that she was finally forced to drop the first mentioned of these departments. She was the first woman in Detroit to adopt journalism as a profession.

Starkey served on the board of directors of the Michigan Authors' Association. She was one of the charter members of the Michigan Woman's Press Association, ending her affiliation with it when she joined the Michigan Woman's Press Club, of which she served as president in 1894. Starkey was also a member of the Daughters of the American Revolution.

== Death ==
Jennie O. Starkey died in Detroit of pneumonia, following an attack of Spanish influenza, October 21, 1918.
