= Ladies of the Maccabees Building =

- U.S. National Register of Historic Places
- Michigan State Historic Site
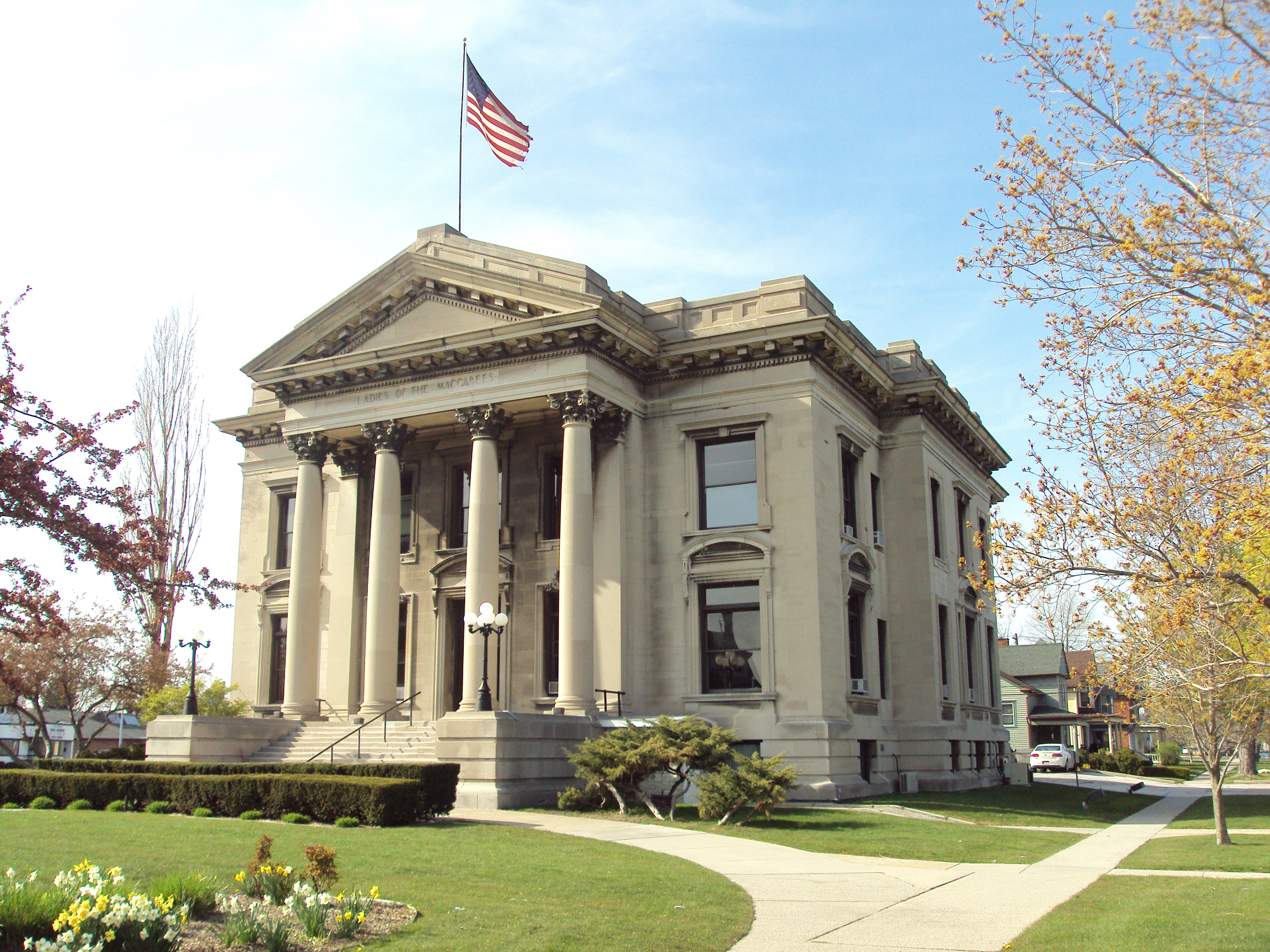

- Location within Michigan Location within the United States
- Interactive map
- Location: 901 Huron Ave., Port Huron, Michigan
- Coordinates: 42°59′0″N 82°25′29″W
- Area: less than one acre
- Built: 1904
- Architect: George H. Harvey
- Architectural style: Classical Revival
- NRHP reference No.: 82004469
- Added to NRHP: April 22, 1982

The Ladies of the Maccabees Building is a fraternal organization building, located at 901 Huron Avenue in Port Huron, Michigan. It was listed on the National Register of Historic Places in 1982.

== History ==
The Knights of the Maccabees, a fraternal organization, was organized in 1878, and re-organized in 1881 as the "Knights of the Modern Maccabees". The Ladies of the Maccabees (L.O.T.M.) were organized in 1886 as an auxiliary of the organization. The Ladies of the Modern Maccabees (L.O.T.M.M.) grew over the next decade, and severed ties with the men's organization in 1902. In 1906, the organization hired architect George L. Harvey to design this building for use as their headquarters. By 1912, the order had over 51,000 members.

In 1926, the Ladies of the Maccabees merged with the men, with the combined organization known simply as the Maccabees. In 1928, the organization moved their headquarters from Port Huron to the newly built Maccabees Building in Detroit. The organization sold the Ladies of the Maccabees Building in Port Huron to the local Board of Education, and it was used to house the Port Huron Junior College until 1957. The building was then used for Board of Education administrative offices until 1981, when it was purchased by a group of attorneys for office space.

== Description ==
The Ladies of the Maccabees Building is a square plan, the Classical Revival building with rusticated foundation, smooth limestone walls, and a low pitched roof with a shallow dome atop. A cornice an parapet wall encircles the building. Each facade is symmetrical, with a slightly projecting central pavilion. The main facade has a two-story portico containing four Corinthian columns, sheltering a double-door entryway. All windows are large, one-over-one double-hung units, with elaborate surrounds.

The interior has a central grand staircase which leads upward three stories to the dome. The lobby surrounding the stair has a decorative tile floor, and is decorated with Corinthian columns and pilasters. The trim throughout the building is oak.
