= Frances E. Burns =

American business woman

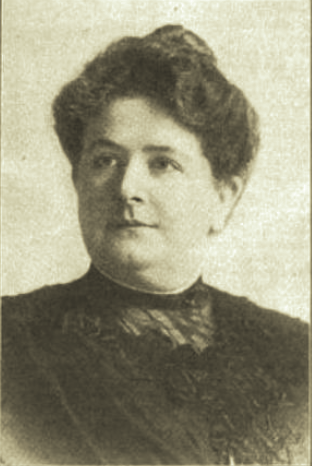
Frances E. Burns

Frances E. Burns (May 2, 1866 – November 19, 1937) was an American social leader and business woman. She served as Great Commander for Michigan of the Ladies of the Maccabees. She was the first woman executive of an American fraternal congress that was national in its scope.

== Early life and education ==
Frances E. Sanford was born on a farm 1.5 miles (2.4 km) from Ionia, Michigan, on May 2, 1866. Her parents were James Bronson Sanford and Maria Yeomans Sanford (1826–1904). They were American born but both were of English descent. Her father had been a merchant in Chicago before moving to the Ionia farm, where she was the second youngest child. She had two sisters and seven brothers. The family was financially comfortable.

Until she was seventeen years of age, Burns lived on the farm. During those early years she attended district school. She then graduated from the High School of Ionia. She was greatly interested and excelled in English and English composition. She was fond of home talent theatricals and usually managed to land the role of leading heroine. She also devoted much time and attention to music and singing, but a severe attack of diphtheria, when she was eighteen years of age, affected her vocal cords and spoiled her voice for singing. She was a devotee of horseback riding. She rode bareback and astride. From this it is evident that her parents were exceedingly liberal minded for their day and time.

== Career ==
After graduating from high school, she taught kindergarten in St. Louis, Michigan. There, she met John H. Burns, whom she married in October 1887. They had two children, Elizabeth (b. 1889) and Robert (b. 1891).

Burns became an endowment member of the Great Hive Ladies of the Maccabees for Michigan on October 17, 1892. She was a delegate to the Great Hive review in 1894. At that time, she was elected Great Lieutenant Commander. At the end of her two-year term, Burns was elected Great Commander. Lillian M. Hollister, who had held that office for three years, gave it up in order to accept the office of Supreme Commander of the Supreme Hive. Burns held the office continuously from June 1896.

Burns first appeared as a delegate to the National Fraternal Congress (N.F.C.) in 1896. The Maccabees were then prominent and very active in the Congress. Burns was a quiet observer and a receptive student. She was present as a delegate in 1897, again as a student and observer. The session of 1898 was a repetition of the previous congresses so far as Burns was concerned. At the close of the N.F.C. session of 1898, she was appointed a member of the Committee on Constitution and Laws. At the 1899 N.F.C., she led the Great Hive delegation. Although she was at that time an eloquent and forcible speaker, there is no information to the effect that she took any active part in the discussions; it appears she was still the student-observer. Burns went home from the 1901 N.F.C. determined to place her society upon a safe and permanent basis. She realized that she must first ascertain what such a basis was. That would take time. She found herself and her society involved in a snarl which had grown out of the differences arising between the Supreme Tent and the Great Camp of Michigan.

At the 1902 N.F.C., Burns was a member of the Committee on Statistics and Good of the Orders; she read a paper entitled "Woman's Work in Connection with Fraternal Beneficiary Orders". At the 1903 session, she served as a member of the Committee on Distribution. At the 1905 session, she participated in the joint meetings of the conference committees and joined in the report submitted to the Congress. At the 1906 session, she served as Chair of the Committee on Conference. She took a fairly active part in the 1908 and 1909 sessions.

Burns was a regular attendant of the N.F.C. for more than 25 years, missing perhaps only one session in all that time. For several years, she was Secretary of the Presidents' Section, which she helped to organize. Later, she served the Section in the capacity of vice-president and then of President. In 1915, she was elected vice-president of the Congress by a close vote. She was the first woman ever elected to the office. Following the society's common practice, she should have been elected president the following year, but she was not. In 1920, the American Fraternal Congress was organized. The L.O.T.M. affiliated with it, Burns was elected vice-president, and the next year, she was elected president. Thus, she became the first woman executive of an American fraternal congress that was national in its scope.

She developed not only into one of the stalwart leaders of fraternalism, but also one of the foremost American businesswomen. In 1896, there were 23,615 benefit members, with US$21,737,500 insurance in force, plus 7,000 social members. By 1921, there were 45,775 benefit members; with US$33,760,750, and 9,688 social members. There is nothing to indicate that Burns had any comprehensive knowledge of the insurance feature of a fraternal beneficiary society when she joined the Great Hive in October, 1892, when she became the Great Lieutenant Commander in 1894, or even when she became Great Commander in 1896. It can be assumed that she was uninformed upon that important side of her society, because there were then no fraternal executives who were thoroughly vested in life insurance matters.

Burns and her society were affiliated with half a dozen world movements. She was a member of the Episcopal Church. She was a Democrat and had been a member of the Democratic State Central Committee. She was a member of the League of Women Voters, the Daughters of the American Revolution, and the Women's Auxiliary War Board in Michigan. She was vice-president of the Michigan Community Council for two years. She served as vice-president of the National Council of Women, and as Chair of the Finance Committee of the International Council of Women.

In 1921, after a serious illness, she had her tonsils removed, which, at her age, was equivalent to a major operation. While in Washington, D.C., attending the burial of America's Unknown Soldier, she suffered a serious nervous breakdown.

== Death and legacy ==
Frances Burns died at her home in Palmetto hotel, Detroit, Michigan, November 19, 1937; interment was at St. Louis, Michigan.

The Frances E. Burns Maccabee Home for Aged Women, in Alma, Michigan, was named in her honor.
