= Katherine Kurt =

American homeopathic physician (1852–1910)

Dr. Katherine Kurt
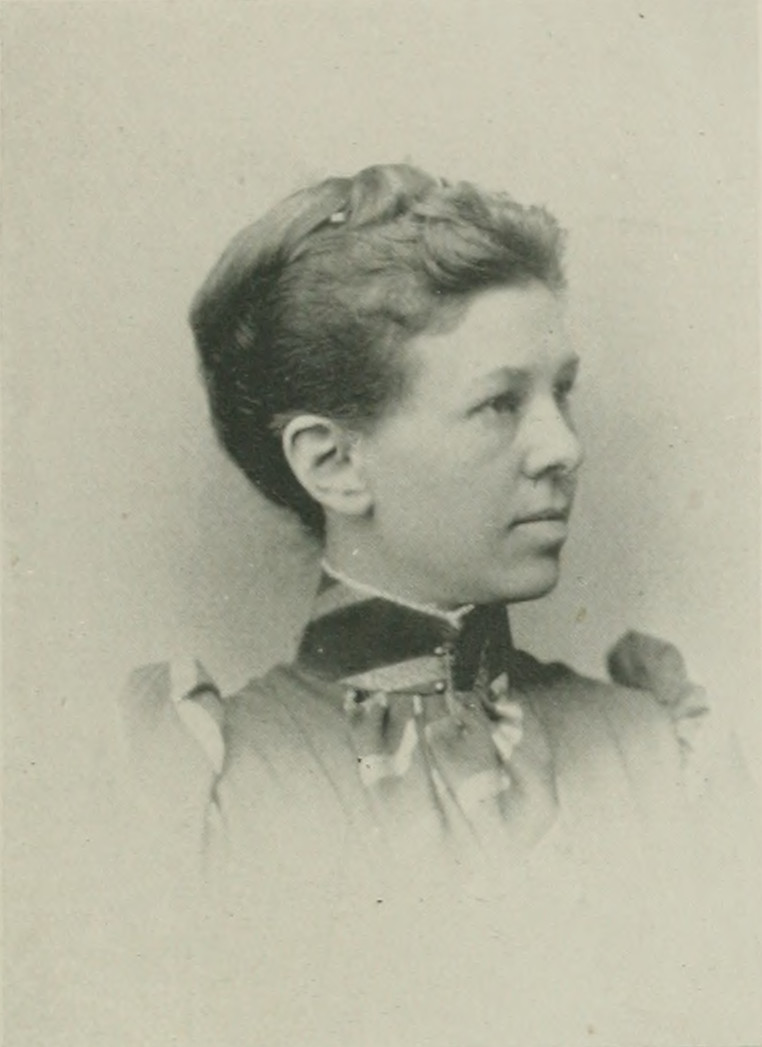
- Portrait from A Woman of the Century
- Born: December 19, 1852; Wayne County, Ohio, U.S.
- Died: September 13, 1910 (aged 57); Akron, Ohio, U.S.
- Education: Hahnemann Medical College of Chicago
- Occupation: homeopathic physician

Katherine Kurt (1852–1910) was an American homeopathic physician. She was the first woman physician who ever practiced in Akron, Ohio.

== Early life and education ==
Katherine Kurt was born in Sterling or Wooster, Ohio. December 19, 1852. Her parents were John and Katherine Kurt, both of Swiss descent. She was the eighth of a family of twelve children, and the first born in the U.S. The father was a weaver and found it hard to keep so large a family. Upon the death of the mother, when Katherine was eight years old, all the children but one or two of the older ones were placed in the homes of friends. The father was opposed to having any of the children legally adopted by his friends, but he placed Katherine in a family where, for a number of years, she had a home.

A few months each year, she attended a public school.

When about 19 years old, she began to teach in the public schools of Wayne County, Ohio, and she saved enough to allow her to enter an academy, that she might better prepare herself for teaching, which, at that time, was her only aim. While in the academy in Lodi, Ohio, the idea of being a physician was first suggested to her, and from that time on, she worked, studying and teaching, with that aim in mind.

In the spring of 1877, she entered Buchtel College (now University of Akron, Akron, Ohio, as a special student. There she remained about three years, working her own way, the third year being an assistant teacher in the preparatory department. During the latter part of her course in Buchtel College, she also began the study of medicine under the preceptorship of Dr. J. W. Rockwell of Akron.

In the fall of 1880, she entered the Hahnemann Medical College of Chicago, from which institution she was graduated on February 23, 1882, (Note: The Journal of the American Institute of Homoeopathy records Kurt as graduating from the Hahnemann Medical College of Chicago in 1881, though this seems implausible based on when she entered the college.) ranked among the first of a class of 101 students, having spent one term as assistant in the Chicago Medical and Surgical Institute.

== Career ==
She then went to Akron, and opened an office in June 1882. In less than ten years, she secured an established, lucrative practice, without any debts, and had some paying investments. She served as physical examiner in Buchtel College and as medical examiner for the Ladies of the Maccabees, of which organization she was a member. She was also a member, and in 1896, was president, of the Northeastern Ohio Homeopathic Medical Society; was a member and, since 1887, secretary of the Summit County Clinical Society; and was also a member and second vice-president of the Homeopathic Medical Society of the State of Ohio.

In religion, Kurt was a Universalist. She was active in church work and for a number of years, was a Sunday school teacher. She favored philanthropic and reformatory movements. Kurt was an advocate for the higher education of woman and a firm believer in suffrage for woman.

Politically, she sympathized with the Prohibition Party. For several years, she was the State superintendent of heredity in the Ohio Woman's Christian Temperance Union.

== Death ==
During the last 18 months of her life, Kurt suffered from a lingering illness. She died in Akron, Ohio, September 13, 1910, from pneumonia, following a fall which resulted in a fracture of the hip.
