= Claudia Quigley Murphy =

American journalist and advertising veteran

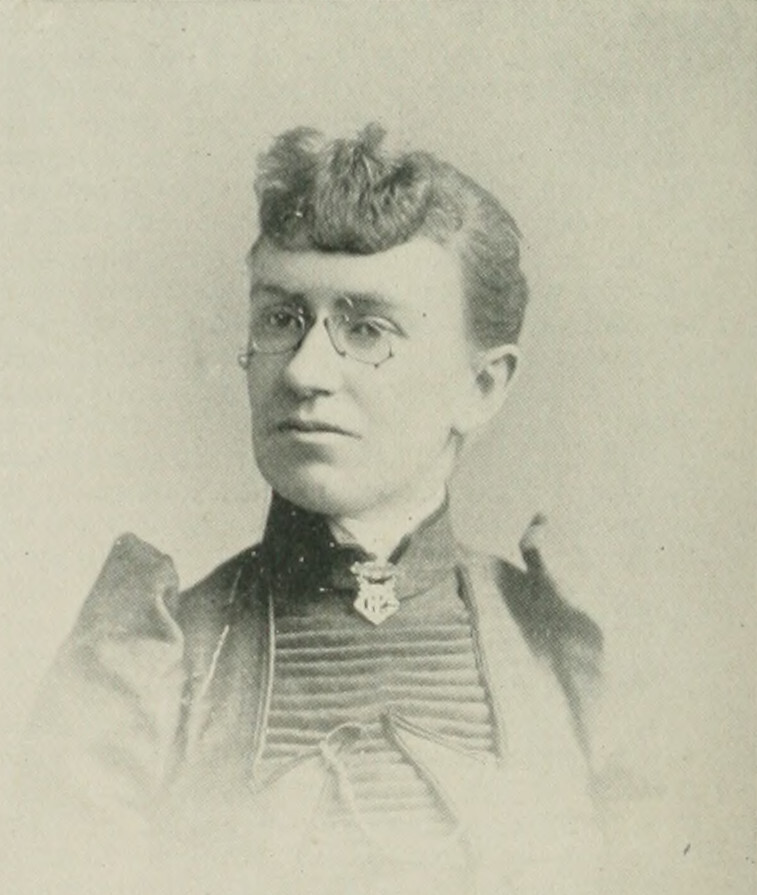
- Portrait from A Woman of the Century
- Born: Claudia Quigley; March 28, 1863; Toledo, Ohio, U.S.
- Died: October 2, 1941 (aged 78); Grand Rapids, Michigan, U.S.
- Occupations: journalist; advertising veteran; economic consultant; advisory counsel; author
- Spouse: Michael H. Murphy (m. 1883)

Signature
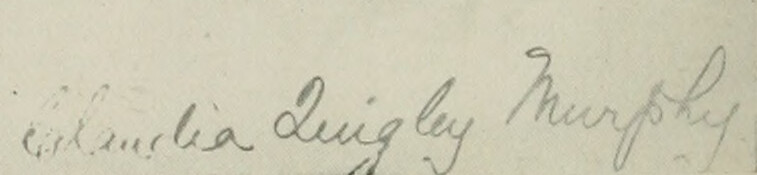

Claudia Quigley Murphy (1863–1941) was an American journalist and advertising veteran, remembered as one of the first woman newspaper reporters in the U.S. She had a special talent for interviewing people. Murphy pivoted her career to become a home economic consultant and advisory counsel to the women's national economic committee. She was the author of several books and a textbook.

== Early life and education ==
Claudia Quigley was born in Toledo, Ohio, March 28, 1863. She was descended from one of the pioneer settlers of the Maumee valley. Her father was Edward Quigley, and her mother was Eliza Sidley, whose home was in Geauga County, Ohio. As newlyweds, the couple settled in Toledo.

When five years old, Claudia's school education began in the St. Ursula Academy, in her native city. She continued her studies there until 1881, when she commenced the study of medicine with Dr. Elmina M. Roys Gavitt, the leading woman physician of Toledo and one of the foremost in Ohio. At the end of the first year, her eyesight was impaired and she was compelled to end those studies.

== Career ==
Five years later, her newspaper work began as the Toledo correspondent of the Catholic Knight, of Cleveland, Ohio. Next, she became the managing editor of the Grand Rapids, Michigan edition of the Michigan Catholic with headquarters in that city. During her stay there, Murphy, with two other women, began the work of organizing the Michigan Woman's Press Association, of which she was elected recording secretary, a position she held until she left the State.

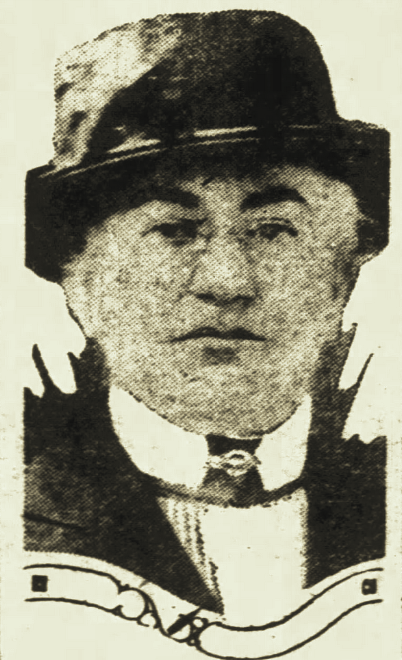
Murphy in a 1919 publication

In the fall of 1890, Murphy joined the Staff of the Toledo Commercial, resigning after she was ready for a new career. She next became the editor and publisher of the Woman's Recorder, a paper devoted to the interests of women, and an emphasis in urging the political equality of women with men. She also served as Advertising Manager for Alabastine in Grand Rapids.

She began working in the advertising field in Grand Rapids in 1900.

Murphy in a 1924 publication

Murphy published several books. A Collation of Cakes, printed in 1923, was intended to be used in the classroom for the teaching of culinary art as well as in home demonstration work and women's clubs. She offered this book to the Royal Baking Powder Company, who paid her for her services and who assisted in the distribution of the book.

She was, in December 1891, the Ohio president of the International Press League, president of the Toledo Political Equality Club, secretary of the Isabella Congressional Directory, and an active worker in the woman's suffrage association of her own city, one of the oldest societies in the State of Ohio. Murphy served as the first president of the Advertising Women of New York.

== Personal life ==
In 1883, she married Michael H. Murphy and continued to make her home in Toledo. The couple had three daughters: Jennie (b. 1884), Janice (b. 1885), and Helena (b. 1887). Mr. and Mrs. Murphy divorced by 1910.

In 1911, she moved to New York City, where she lived for 17 years.

Claudia Quigley Murphy returned to Grand Rapids, Michigan in 1928, and died there October 2, 1941.

== Selected works ==
=== Books ===
- A Collation of Cakes Yesterday and Today, 1923 (text)
- The History of the Art of Tablesetting: Ancient and Modern, 1921 (text)
- Bread—the Vital Food, 1920 (text)
- Teaching Facts About Window Decoration, 1916
- Wash Day, 1910 (text)

=== Articles ===
- "Little Life Stories (Sketch of Miss Mary E. Orr)", 1907
- "Form Letter Copy That Gets Close to Readers", 1911

==== "The Sanitary Home" series ====
- "A Plea for Better Laundries", 1907
- "A Plan for Fall House Cleaning", 1907
- "The Care of Woodwork", 1907
- "Some Practical Hints that Will Make Holiday Work Much Easier, 1907
- "The Sensible Bedroom", 1907
