= Ladies of the Maccabees =

American fraternal benefit society

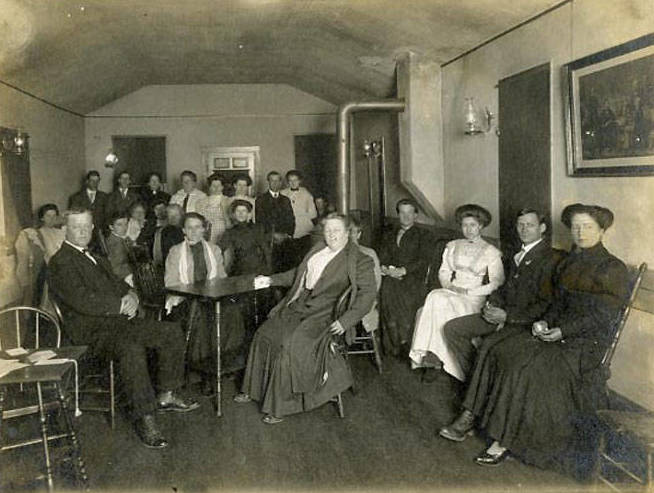
Lady Maccabees meeting in the Ironville Neighborhood House, Toledo, Ohio, approximately 1909

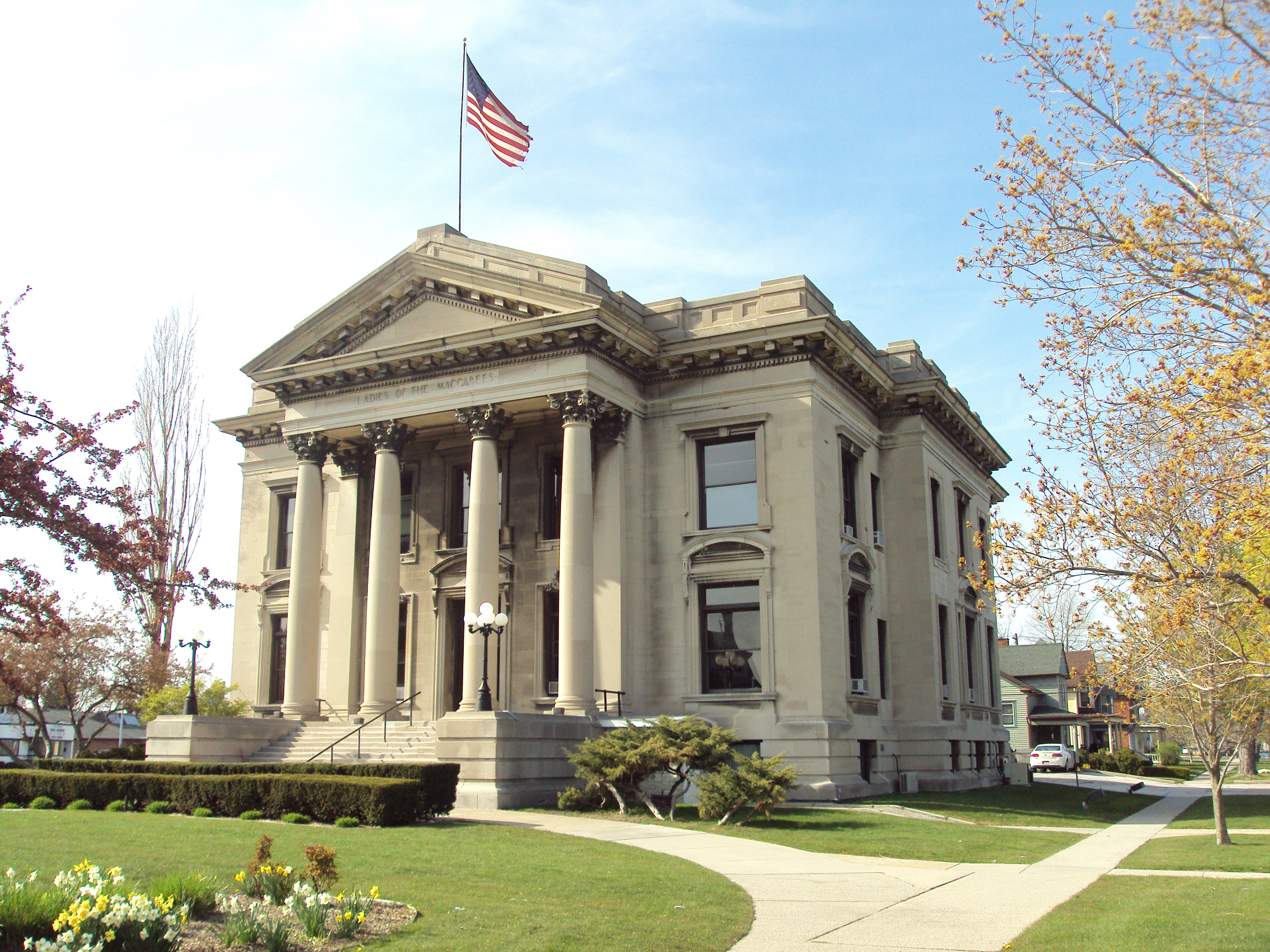
Ladies of the Maccabees Building

The Ladies of the Maccabees (acronym, LOTM; 1886-1926), the female auxiliary of the Knights of the Maccabees, was an insurance benefit society. It was the first fraternal benefit society operated exclusively by women. Established as a woman's auxiliary in 1886, it was approved by the 1890 "Great Camp" of the Knights, incorporated in 1891, split in 1892, re-incorporated in 1895 in conformity with the provisions of the Fraternal Act of 1893, and merged into the Knights in 1926. In 1982, the Ladies of the Maccabees Building, in Port Huron, Michigan was listed on the National Register of Historic Places.

The different branches were called "Hives." The "Supreme Hive" (later "Woman's Benefit Association of the Maccabees) was organized in 1892 "to harmonize the workings of various Great Hives and to render their social, ritualistic, and other work uniform." Opposed to it was the "Great Hive." The quarrel between the two grew out of the differences arising between the Supreme Tent and the Great Camp of Michigan. Something of the element of personal animosity had grown up with these differences. The Great Hive was confined in its operations to the State of Michigan. The plan of extending its jurisdiction to outside States was the paramount question before the fourth biennial review held in June, 1902. By a very large vote authority was given to amend the society's name and to enter other States. The name was accordingly changed to the Great Hive, Ladies of the Modern Maccabees. At about the same time the Great Camp took similar action and pursued the same course. After that the fat was in the fire and there were some great doings in Maccabee circles. In fact, a severe clash had previously taken place between the Great Hive and the Supreme Hive. It appears that the former had filed a bill in equity, the purpose of which was to enjoin the Supreme Hive from using the official name, ritualistic work, paraphernalia, etc. The Supreme Hive filed a cross-bill praying that the Great Hive be enjoined from using the official name and terminology, the ritualistic work, the paraphernalia, etc., outside the State of Michigan. In April, 1902, the circuit court handed down a decree which virtually granted the prayer of the Great Hive. Maccabee blood was much riled by this time, and the case was carried to the Supreme Court. In April, 1904, the Supreme Court reversed the decision of the lower court. The antagonisms engendered by these proceedings have not entirely vanished even at the present day. The Ladies of the Modern Maccabees got busy at once. A new ritual was adopted, which provided for entirely new ritualistic work. In 1915 the Supreme Hive changed its corporate name to the Woman's Benefit Association of the Maccabees. The following year the Great Hive changed its corporate name to Ladies of the Maccabees. In this way a long-standing and prolific cause of vexatious annoyance to both societies was removed.

== Early history ==
On March 25, 1886, nine women met at the home of Adelphia Grace Ward (aka Mother of the Order, Past Great Commander) to establish the order of the LOTM. She became known as "Mother Ward" throughout the length and breadth of Maccabeedom.

The women began as a local club, or "Hive" in Muskegon, Michigan, but made application to form a statewide auxiliary at the 1886 Knights of the Maccabees Great Camp convention; they were denied. They tried again at the 1887 convention and were turned down. In 1888, permission was given to create a "Great Hive" for the state of Michigan. Laws were drawn up and officials elected and the Great Hive of Michigan was chartered in May 1890. Great Hives were founded in other states such as Ohio and New York, and a "Supreme Hive" was established on October 1, 1892.

By December 1, 1896, there were Great Hives in half of the states in the Union as well as Canada and membership was up to 66,000, with 33,000 in Michigan alone.

In 1915, the LOTM had 179,719 members. In 1923, a juvenile department was created, the issuance of twenty-year payment certificates authorized, and the "Maccabee Temple," formerly the headquarters of the Knights of the Maccabees, at Port Huron purchased. In 1924, the LOTM had 858 lodges with a benefit membership of 45,384 and a social membership of 9,582.

The LOTM merged into the Knights of the Maccabees in 1926.

== Headquarters ==
The headquarters of this "Order" traveled a great deal more than the headquarters of most societies. Until the first annual review, they were located in Muskegon. Thereafterm they were located in Saginaw, Michigan. After the fourth annual review, in 1893, they were moved to Ann Arbor, Michigan. The sixth biennial review, held in 1906, authorized their removal to the Modern Maccabee Temple, in Port Huron, where they were located ever since.

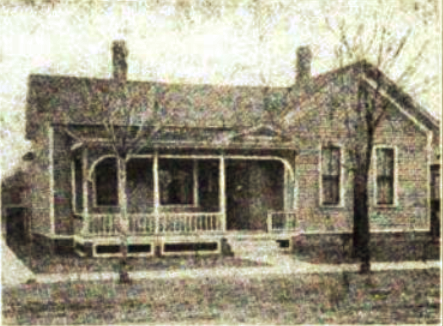
Home of Mrs. Adelphia G. Ward, Muskegon, Michigan. First headquarters of LOTM

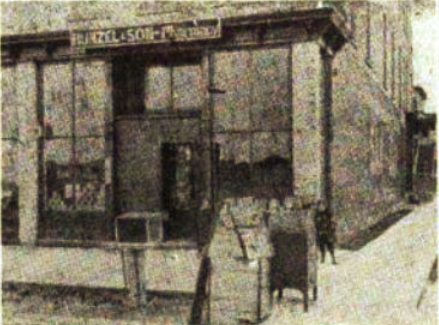
Second Great Hive Office, Muskegon, Michigan

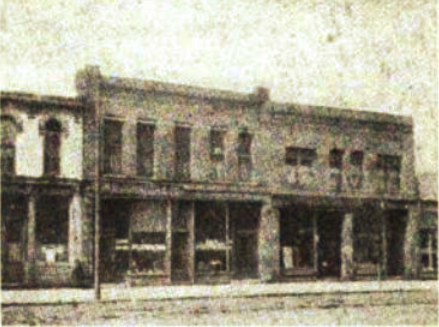
Third Great Hive Office, Saginaw, Michigan

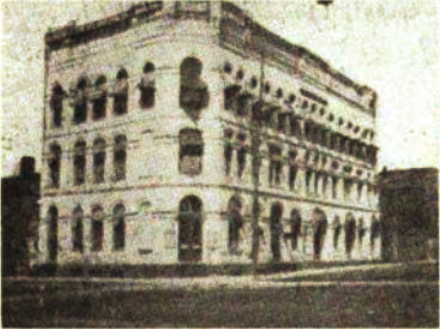
Fourth Great Hive Office, Ann Arbor, Michigan

== Schism ==
In 1892, there was a schism within the auxiliary and a new group was formed called the Ladies of the Modern Maccabees (LOTMM). The LOTMM were later led by schoolteacher Bina West Miller who wanted to help build a fraternal insurance society for women, and she was quite successful. The LOTMM became the Women's Benefit Association of the Maccabees in 1915 and the North American Benefit Association in 1966. By the early twentieth century, the group had 100,000 members and by the late 1920s over 250,000. It still had 80,000 members in 1994.

== Notable people ==
- M. E. C. Bates (1839-1905), honorary member of Traverse Bay Hive
- Marion Babcock Baxter (1850-1910), deputy supreme commander
- Emma E. Bower (1852–1937) Great Record Keeper; published The Lady Maccabee
- Frances E. Burns (1866-1937), Great Commander for Michigan
- Dr. Mary M. Danforth, Supreme Medical Examiner
- Eva C. Doughty (1852-1929), committee on credentials
- Kate Stevens Harpel (1867-1950), teacher, physician
- Lillian Hollister (1853–1911), elected Great Commander, LOTM, 1893
- Katherine Kurt (1852-1910); homeopathic; member and examiner, LOTM
- Bina West Miller (1867-1954), LOTM leader
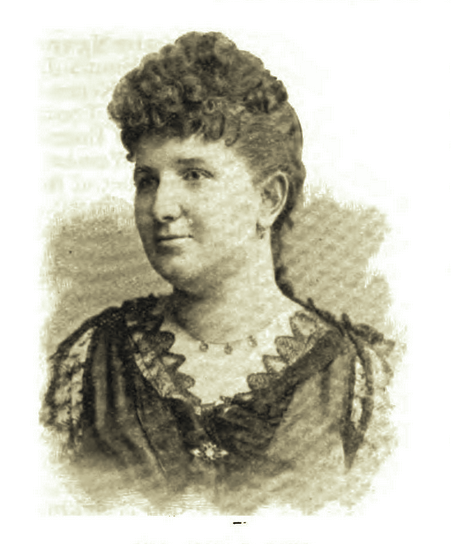
Alice E. Boyd

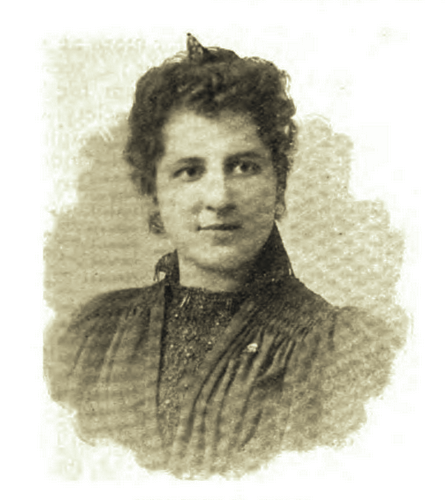
Bina West Miller

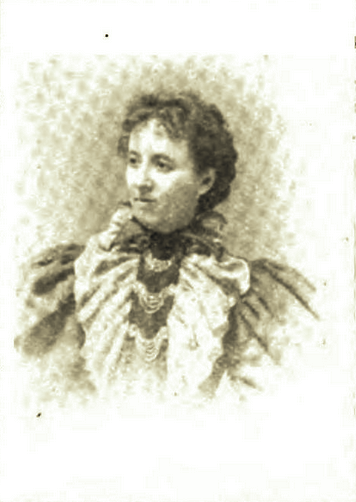
Carrie M. Davis

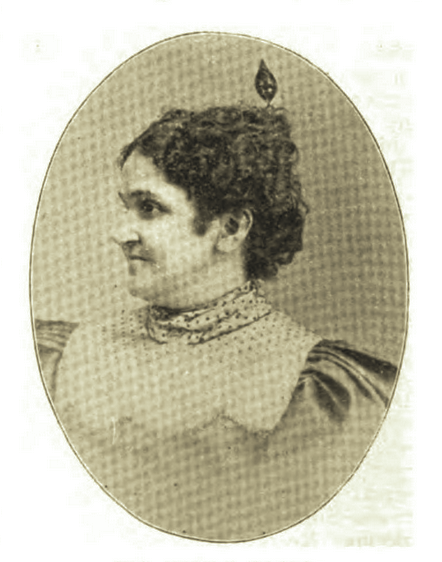
Ellen E. Downer

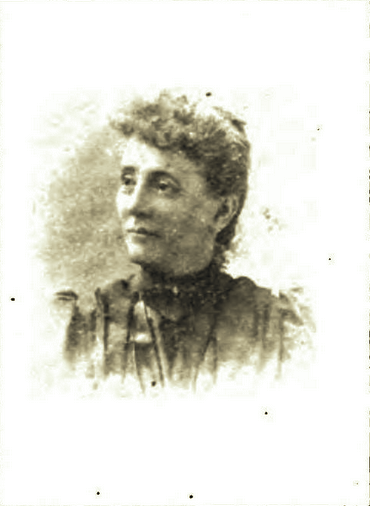
Emma D. Cook

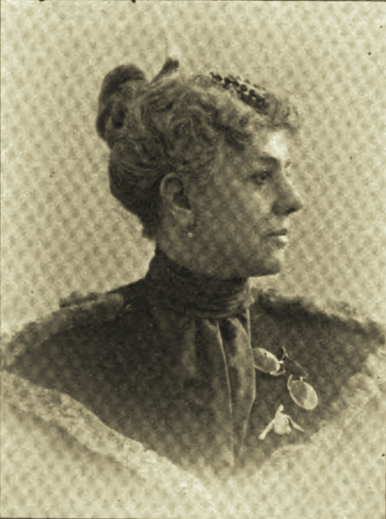
Emma E. Bower

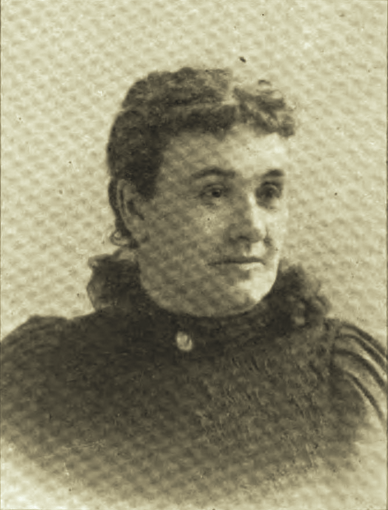
Emma R. Neidig

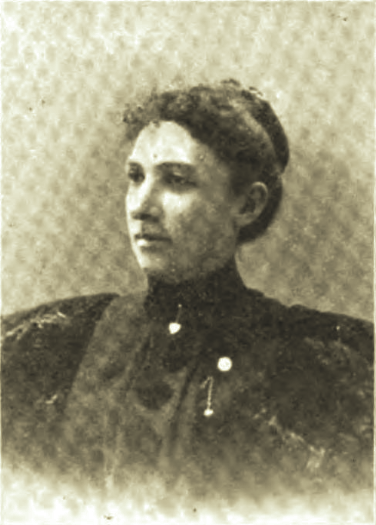
Eudocia S. Moffatt

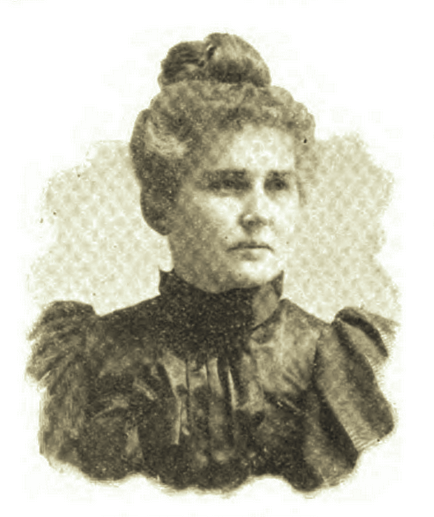
Eva D. Doolittle

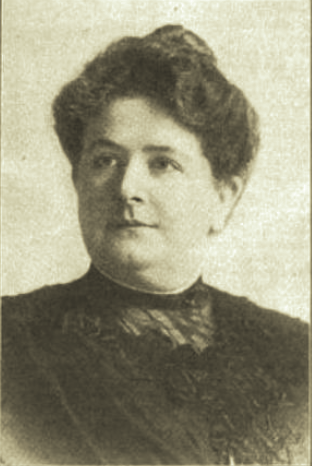
Frances E. Burns

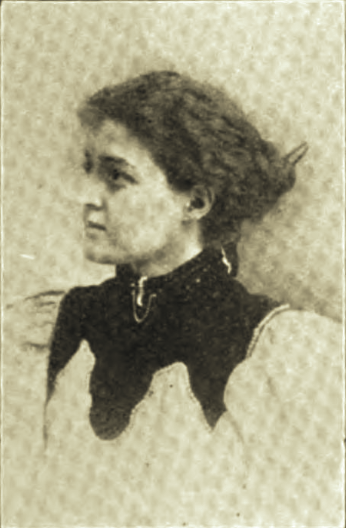
Grace H. Meredith

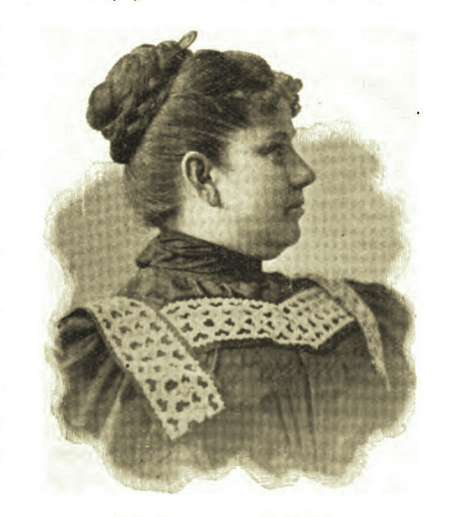
Helen M. Truesdell

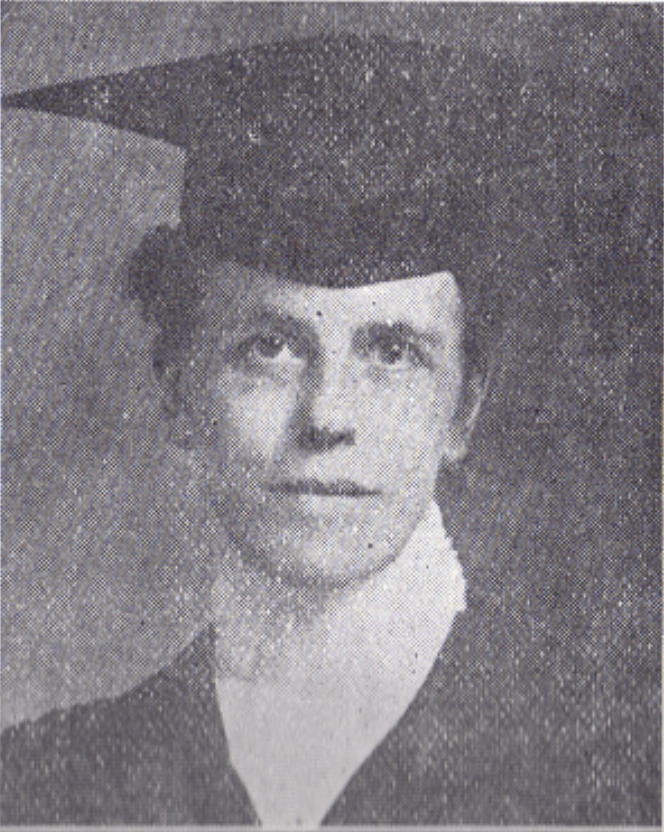
Kate Stevens Harpel

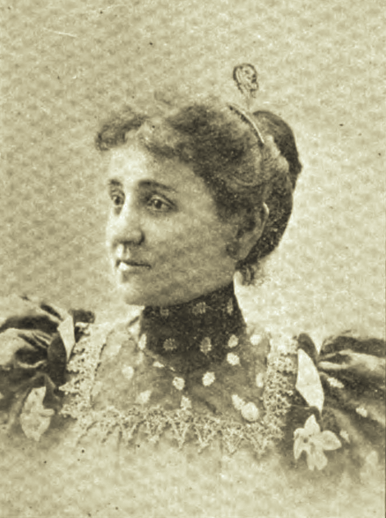
Kittie C. Warner

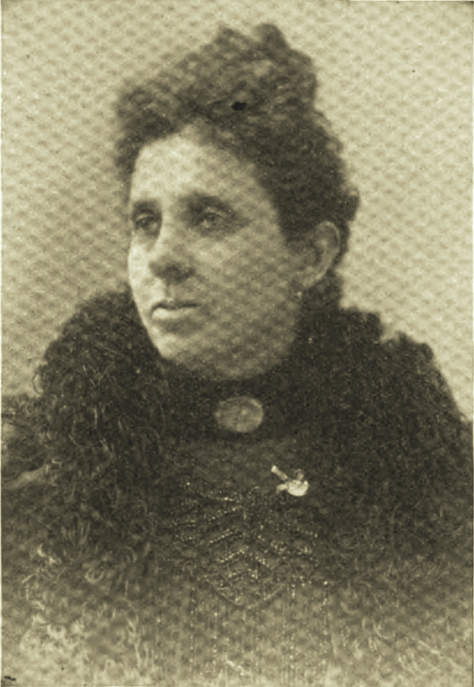
Lillian Hollister

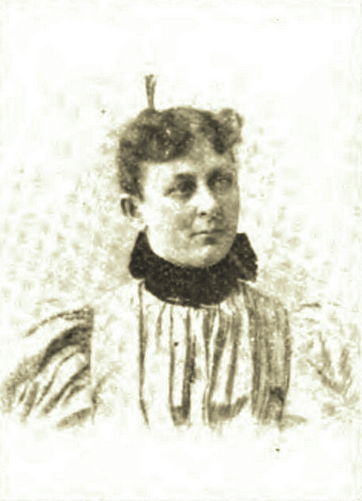
Liota B. Maxwell

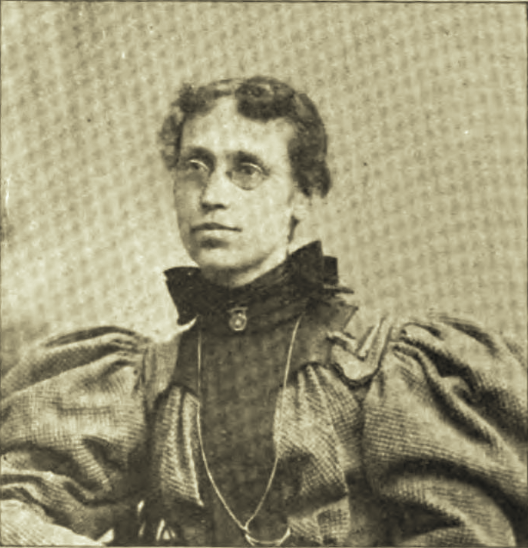
Lydia R. De Groate

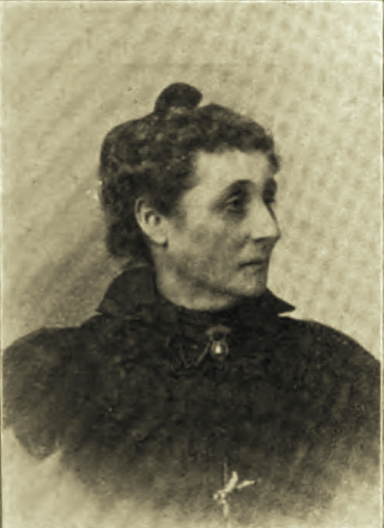
Mary J. Tyler

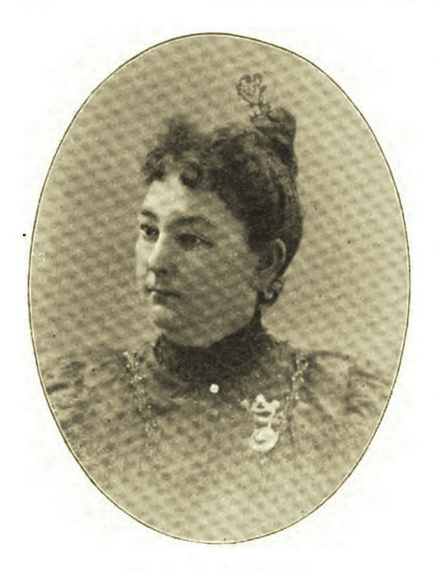
Dr. Mary M. Danforth

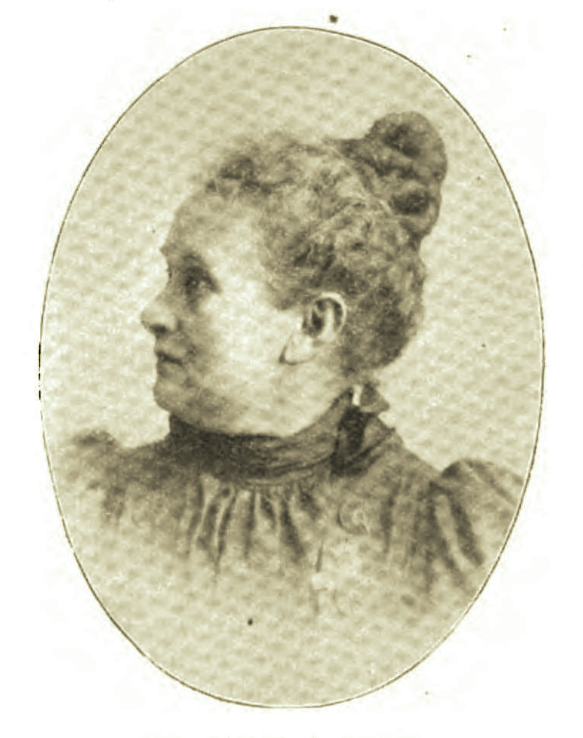
Rachel A. Bailey

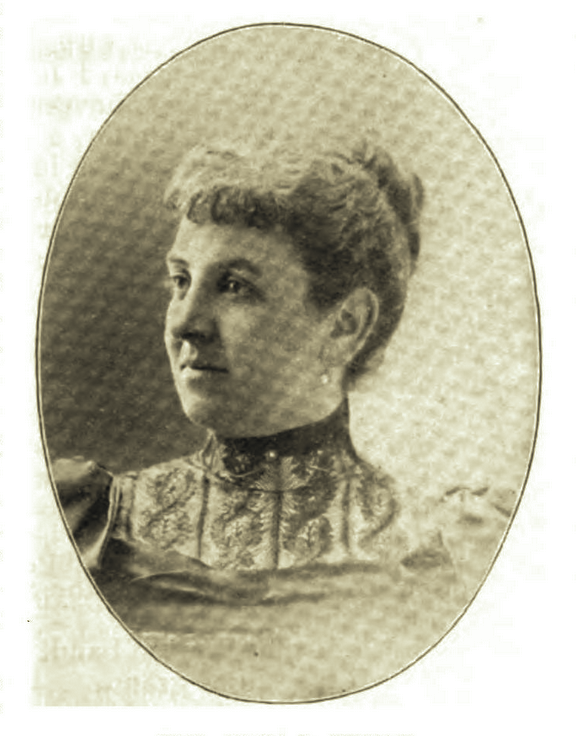
Susie S. Graves
