= M. E. C. Bates =

American writer, journalist, newspaper editor

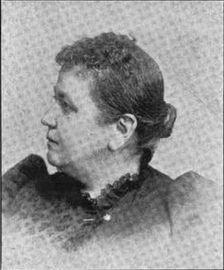
- PHoto in Michigan Woman's Press Association, 1893
- Born: Martha Elizabeth Cram; August 25, 1839; Northville, Michigan, U.S.
- Died: March 23, 1905 (aged 65); Traverse City, Michigan, U.S.
- Education: Eastern Michigan University
- Occupations: Writer; journalist; newspaper editor
- Spouse: Thomas Tomlinson Bates (m. 1867)
- Children: 3
- Writing career
- Language: English
- Notable work: Along Traverse shores

M. E. C. Bates (née, Cram; August 25, 1839 – March 23, 1905) was the pen name of Martha Elizabeth Cram Bates, an American writer, journalist, and newspaper editor. She was widely known throughout the Grand Traverse region, and throughout the State of Michigan as well, having been closely identified with literary work since childhood. She was, perhaps, the first woman in the state who engaged in regular newspaper work, having been connected with the Grand Traverse Herald, of which her husband, Thomas Tomlinson Bates, was editor, from 1876.

== Early life and education ==
Martha Elizabeth Cram was born in Northville, Michigan, August 25, 1839. She was the daughter of Mr. and Mrs. Jesse Cram, whose family moved to Traverse City, Michigan in 1863. Her early childhood was spent in Northville, Goodrich, and Flint, Michigan.

At the age of 14, Bates began to teach school, being a teenager of remarkable mental ability and a good student. Later on, she attended the Ypsilanti State Normal School and was one of the early graduates of what is now Eastern Michigan University.

As a young girl, her literary talent and interests resulted in a number of articles that were published in leading periodicals.

== Career ==
Bates devoted several years of her early life to teaching. But she not only had the ability, but the inherent ambition to become a writer. In early womanhood, she frequently contributed to the leading magazines of that period and the quality of her work was recognized by publishers.

On May 5, 1867, she married Thomas T. Bates. After her marriage, Bates continued her literary work with her husband, becoming the associate editor of the Grand Traverse Herald since that paper came into possession of Mr. Bates in 1876. The most conspicuous features of her literary work were the Home and Sunshine departments of the Herald, and for seven years, the Household department of the Evening Record. These departments were always popular and were read by readers in thousands of homes in Traverse City and the Grand Traverse region. The Herald was a large, 8-column, 10-page paper, and was home-printed, a feature involving an extra amount of editorial labor of husband, wife, and daughter working together.

Bates was the oldest continuous newspaper correspondent in Michigan, and for nearly forty years, had been one of the most prominent writers for the Detroit Tribune. She was one of the organizers of the Michigan Woman's Press Association in 1890; its president for several years; and after the death of Lucinda Hinsdale Stone, honorary president of the association.

When the Ladies' Library Association of Traverse City was organized in 1869, Bates was one of its charter members, and a member of the executive board until her health failed. After her active participation ceased, she was made an advisory member of the board. Among the charter members of the Woman's Club, Bates was numbered as one of the most active and she was, devoted to the advancement of woman's work. She was also an honorary member of Traverse Bay Hive, Ladies of the Maccabees (L. O. T. M.).

In addition to her work on the Herald, Bates did an immense amount of literary work in the way of correspondence, sketches, stories and poems. She also wrote several books. With Mary Knezik Buck, Bates was the joint author of, Along Traverse Shores, and A Few Verses for a Few Friends. Bates was the author of Young People's History of Michigan, which was used in many schools of the State for historical study.

== Personal life ==
In religion, Bates was one of the three surviving charter members of the local Congregational church. While she had been an invalid for about three years, Bates suffered much during the last six months. She died at Traverse City, March 23, 1905, and was buried at Oakwood Cemetery in that town. She was survived by her husband, Thomas, and three children, George G. Bates, proprietor of the American Poultry Journal of Chicago and vice president of the Herald and Record Co.; Mabel and Clara.

== Selected works ==
- Along Traverse shores, 1891 (with Mary K. Buck)
