= Bina West Miller =

American businesswoman (1867-1954)

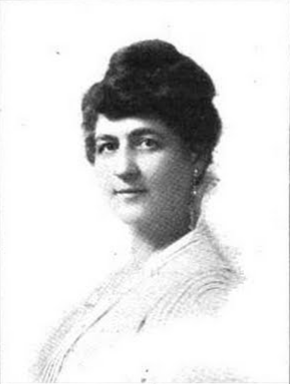
- Bina M. West Miller, 1918
- Born: Sabina M. West; 1867; St. Clair County, Michigan
- Died: 1954 (aged 86–87); Evanston, Illinois
- Known for: founded the Woman’s Benefit Association of the Maccabees

Sabina West Miller (1867 – 18 April 1954) was an American businesswoman. She was a leader of the Ladies of the Maccabees.

== Biography ==
Sabina ("Bina") M. West was born in 1867, in Columbus Township, St. Clair County, Michigan. Beginning her career as a teacher at Capac High School, Miller became a member of the Knights of the Maccabees. She began providing life insurance to women by working with the Maccabees and helped found the Woman's Benefit Association of the Maccabees, known today as Women's Life. Miller founded one of the first organizations to offer life insurance to women with $500 of borrowed money. With the borrowed money, she promoted the organization by selling memberships for her organization. She also established local chapters in the locations she visited across the United States and Canada. She heavily promoted the group, and within a decade grew membership to 100,000 women. The company she founded is today the Woman's Life Insurance Society, located in Port Huron, Michigan. Miller also served as a woman's suffrage advocate, giving lecture tours across the country and around the world. A devoted Republican, she gave one of the speeches nominating Herbert Hoover's vice presidential candidate at the Republican National Convention. The Detroit Free Press named Miller one of the top businesswomen in Michigan, and the Associated Press called her "one of the five greatest women in America."

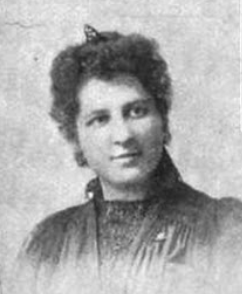
Bina M. West Miller (1895)

Miller died on 18 April 1954 in Evanston, Illinois, in the home of her nephew.
