= Martha Louise Rayne =

American journalist (1836–1911)

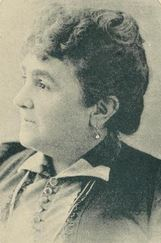
- Born: Martha Louise Woodworth; August 1, 1836; Halifax, Nova Scotia, Canada
- Died: August 8, 1911 (aged 75); Oak Park, Cook County, Illinois, U.S.
- Other name: Mrs. M. L. Rayne
- Occupations: journalist, writer
- Years active: 1865–1910
- Known for: Founding journalism school

Martha Louise Rayne (1836–1911) was an American who was an early woman journalist. In addition to writing and editing several journals, she serialized short stories and poems in newspapers such as the Chicago Tribune, the Detroit Free Press, and the Los Angeles Herald. In addition to newspaper work, she published a guidebook of Chicago, etiquette books, and several novels. In 1886, she founded what may have been the first women's journalism school in the United States and four years later became a founding member and first vice president of the Michigan Woman's Press Association. Rayne was posthumously inducted into the Michigan Journalism Hall of Fame in 1998 and the Michigan Women's Hall of Fame in 2002.

== Early life ==
Martha Louise Woodworth was born on August 1, 1836 in Halifax, Nova Scotia, Canada to John B. and Martha Woodworth. She came from a literary family, as on her father's side, she was related to Samuel Woodworth and on her mother's side to William Knox. She attended Truro Academy and from an early age had a gift for storytelling and writing. In 1854, she immigrated to Boston, Massachusetts and two years later on April 9, 1856, Woodworth married Robert Weir Rayne in Roxbury. They had four daughters, Gladwing, born in 1857 in Truro, Nova Scotia, and died that same year in Roxbury, Massachusetts; Bessie, was born in 1858, but died in the Dixon Bridge collapse of 1873; Lula G. born in 1859 and Grace I. born in 1862.

== Career ==
Rayne began career in Boston in the early 1860s and then moved briefly to Ohio before arriving in Chicago. One of her earliest published works was a guidebook called Chicago and one hundred miles around printed in 1865. In 1868, she served as the city editor for a paper in Chicago called Sorosis and published poems in the children's paper The Bright Side. She became a freelancer for the Chicago Tribune using the pen name "Vic" and then moved into a Sunday writing position by 1870. Simultaneously, she served as publisher and editor of the Chicago magazine, Fashion, Music and Home Reading. After reporting on the 1874 wedding of Frederick Grant, son of President Ulysses S. Grant, and the wedding of General Philip Sheridan, Rayne interviewed and wrote a piece on Mary Todd Lincoln's confinement in a mental institution, which led to Lincoln's release. In addition, she published several novels, including Jenny and Her Mother (1867), Fallen Among Thieves (1876) and Against Fate: A True Story (1876).

Around 1878, Rayne moved to Detroit and wrote for "The Household" section of the Detroit Free Press, one of the first supplements to a newspaper written solely for women. During this time, she interviewed such celebrities as President Grover Cleveland, Henry Wadsworth Longfellow and John Greenleaf Whittier. In the early 1880s, Rayne wrote two etiquette books, which showed her humor as well as giving practical advice. Her 1884 work, What can a woman do? gave evidence to the growing desire of professions for women and the need that many felt for income production. In 1886, Rayne, founded what she billed as "the world’s first school of journalism" in Detroit, which was open until around 1900. She offered courses in developing a literary style, manuscript preparation, use of language, reporting and other writing skills to provide professional instruction to women, who were typically denied higher education opportunities. Rayne was a member of the National Woman's Press Association and served as the Michigan vice president of the organization in 1886. When Michigan decided to found its own Michigan Woman's Press Association (MWPA) in 1890, Rayne was one of the founding members and served as its first vice president. She was re-elected as vice president in 1894. In 1896, she quit her post on the editorial staff at the Detroit Free Press.

Rayne returned to the Chicago area in 1897 and began writing as a special features editor for the Chicago Times-Herald. She had Lucy Leggett, continue running the journalism school in Detroit until 1900. Around this time, her husband, who had been a semi-invalid, died in 1899. She continued publishing poems and short stories in syndicated newspapers and journals through 1910. Rayne died on August 8, 1911, in Oak Park, Illinois.

== Legacy ==
Posthumously, Rayne was inducted into the Michigan Journalism Hall of Fame in 1998 and the Michigan Women's Hall of Fame in 2002.

== Selected works ==
- Rayne, Mrs. M. L. (1865). Chicago and one hundred miles around: being a complete hand-book and guide to the public and private institutions, churches, schools, libraries, asylums, railroad offices, etc., etc., of the garden city. Chicago, Illinois: R. Edwards, printer. OCLC 270747340.
- Rayne, Mrs. M. L. (1870). Jenny and Her Mother. Chicago, Illinois: Kenney & Sumner. OCLC 905331532.
- Rayne, Mrs. M. L. (1876). Against Fate: A True Story. Chicago, Illinois: W. B. Keen, Cooke & Co.
- Rayne, Mrs. M. L. (1879). Fallen Among Thieves: A Summer Tour. New York, New York: G. W. Carleton & Co.
- Rayne, Mrs. M. L. (1881). Gems of deportment and hints of etiquette: the ceremonials of good society, including valuable moral, mental, and physical knowledge. Detroit, Michigan: Tyler & Co. and R.D.S. Tyler & Co.
- Rayne, Martha Louise (1882). Written for You, Or, The Art of Beautiful Living: Including a Large Amount of Valuable Knowledge Concerning the Every-day Affairs of Life, Social Propriety, Mental and Moral Culture, and All that Pertains to the Successful Realization of a True and Beautiful Life. Detroit, Michigan: Tyler & Co.
- Rayne, Mrs. M. L. (1886). Her Desperate Victory. Chicago, Illinois: Belford, Clarke and Company.
- Rayne, Mrs. M. L. (1887). What can a woman do; or, Her position in the business and literary world. Detroit, Michigan: F.B. Dickerson.
- Rayne, Mrs. M. L. (1888). Pauline, or The belles of Mackinac. Detroit, Michigan: Peninsular Publishing Company Detroit Michigan.
- Rayne, Mrs. M. L. (July 3, 1910). "An Affair of the Heart". Los Angeles Herald Sunday Magazine. Los Angeles, California. p. 10 – via Newspapers.com. and "An Affair of the Heart (pt 2)". Los Angeles Herald. 3 July 1910. p. 11 – via Newspapers.com.
