= Advertising Women of New York =

Advertising Women of New York, Inc. (AWNY; originally, League of Advertising Women of New York; renamed She Runs It in 2016), was the first organization solely for women in the advertising and communications industry in America.

== Description ==
AWNY was founded in 1912 as the League of Advertising Women of New York by journal editors Christine Frederick and J. George Frederick as a response to women's exclusion from the all-male Advertising League. Its primary objectives were to educate its members in advertising and to encourage the active involvement of women in the advertising industry. Claudia Quigley Murphy served as the first president of the AWNY.

Beginning in the 1930s, the club held classes and dinners with speakers on advertising and business practices, and awarded scholarships to girls to help them pursue degrees in advertising. During World War II, they also helped with the economizing campaign.

The organization's roots and origins in membership and service to a community united in its intention to see more women as leaders. Established eight years before the 19th amendment was ratified, AWNY evolved to be a global organization with a membership of approximately 6,000 women and men representing the advertising, marketing, media, promotion and public relations fields. The membership extends across more than 40 states and a dozen countries.

== She Runs It ==
In 2016, the organization rebranded itself as "She Runs It". According to the organization’s website, the “She” in She Runs It stands for every individual who experiences the challenges that women face in marketing, media and tech … and all of their allies. They exist to help their community stay strong, current, connected, and included. She Runs It hosts multiple programs and events each year to provide mentorship, education loan grants, networking, and leadership development to members.

In 2017, She Runs It launched #Inclusive100– (originally called the Inclusion and Diversity Accountability Consortium – in partnership with Seramount (formerly Diversity Best Practices). #Inclusive100 is the first initiative of its kind to use data and measurement to activate and measure progress against DEI commitments.

== Sources ==
- Fox, Stephen (1984). The Mirror Makers: A History of American Advertising and Its Creators. New York: Morrow.
- Frederick, Christine (1929). Selling Mrs. Consumer. New York: The Business Bourse.
- Marchand, Roland (1985). Advertising the American Dream: Making Way for Modernity, 1920-1940. Berkeley: University of California Press.
- Sivulka, Juliann (2009). Ad Women: How They Impact What We Need, Want and Buy. Amherst, NY: Prometheus Books.
- Vega, Tanzina (September 23, 2012). "AdAge Honors Influential Women in the Industry". The New York Times.
