= Lillian Hollister =

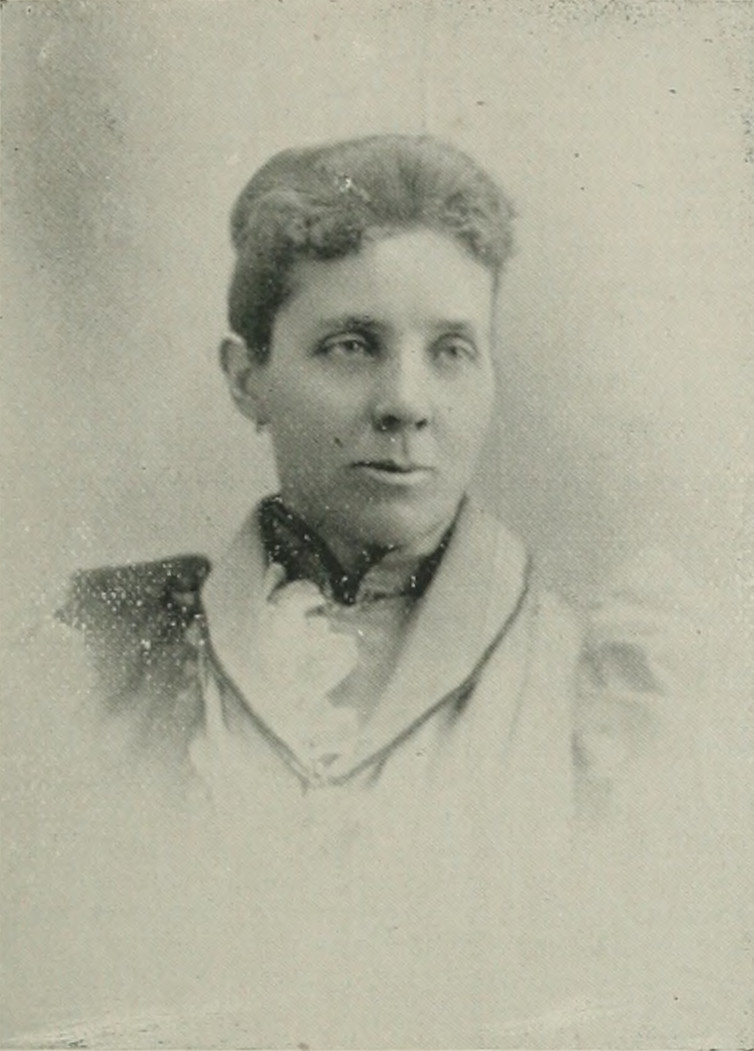
- Lillian Hollister in A Woman of the Century
- Born: Lillian Bates; September 8, 1853; Milford, Michigan
- Died: August 4, 1911 (aged 57); Lilley Township, Michigan
- Burial place: Woodmere Cemetery
- Spouse: Daniel W. Hollister (m. 1872)

Lillian Hollister (September 8, 1853 – August 4, 1911) was an American temperance and church worker. Hollister served as Supreme Commander of the Ladies of the Maccabees.

== Early years and education ==
Lillian Bates was born in Milford, Michigan, September 8, 1853. Her father, Phineas Bates. He was a well-to-do farmer of Oakland County, Michigan, having emigrated from New York at an early day. He was a deacon in the Baptist Church and an earnest anti-slavery man. Her father's family were all musicians. Hollister was one of a family of six children. She was the youngest but one of three brothers and three sisters, four of whom became teachers.

At the age of four and a half years, she began her schoolgirl days, walking one and a half miles to the district schoolhouse. At fourteen, she left the High School and afterwards took a course in normal training. At the age of fifteen was a normal school and high school graduate.

== Career ==
At fifteen she began teaching, adding to her regular work that of normal class instruction.

In 1872, at the age of nineteen, she married Daniel W. Hollister. They lived on a farm until 1881. Hollister was active in Sunday-school work and served as superintendent. In 1881, she moved to Detroit, Michigan. There, she continued her musical and literary studies. She associated herself with the Methodist Episcopal Church and the Woman's Christian Temperance Union (WCTU). In church work, she took a leading part, acting as president of the Ladies' Aid Society of the Simpson Methodist Episcopal Church and as conference secretary of the Woman's Home Missionary Society.

She was a member of the Sunday-school normal class of the Chautauqua Circle, the Deaconess Board and various philanthropic and charity societies. In the WCTU, she was for two years secretary, then vice-president and then president, in which office, for six successive years, she received the compliment of a unanimous re-election each year. In addition to her extensive local work in Detroit, she held the office of State superintendent of the Young WCTU. Her trained executive talents were manifested throughout the State in organizing new unions. As a parliamentarian, there were but few presiding officers who out-performed her in maintaining harmony and expediting the business of meetings.

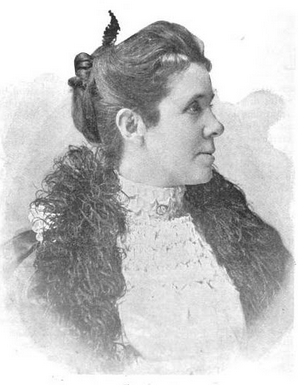
Lillian M. Hollister

In 1893, she was elected Great Commander of the Ladies of the Maccabees. Her trained executive talents were manifested throughout the state in building up the organization and in harmonizing and unifying the work, since which time thousands of members and scores of new Hives were added. During the first eight months of her official life, she held over 200 meetings, besides keeping up the work of the office as the executive officer of the State. She was clear in her rulings and careful to see the justice of a measure from a legal standpoint. At the Biennial Review of the Supreme Hive, May, 1895, Hollister was elected Supreme Commander of the Supreme Hive. With her experience, talent and executive force her election insured the prosperity and growth of the Order.

== Personal life ==
Recognizing the commanding influence of woman in advancing the interests of the church and of all humanitarian institutions, she was slow to favor woman in politics, but later became a convert to the principle of the woman suffrage movement.

She had one son. Hollister died at Lilley, Michigan, August 4, 1911, and was buried at Woodmere Cemetery in Detroit, Michigan.
