= Kate Stevens Harpel =

American physician (1867–1950)

Dr. Kate Stevens Harpel
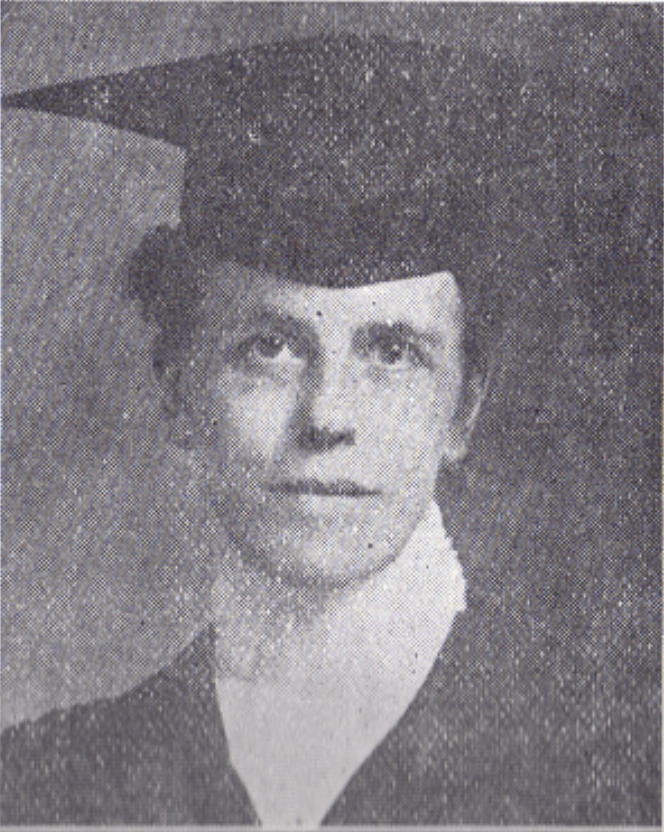
- Born: Kate Stevens; October 22, 1867; McHenry County, Illinois
- Died: May 13, 1950 (aged 82); Boone, Iowa
- Education: Drake University; Iowa Agriculture College
- Known for: President, Iowa Society of Medical Women
- Medical career
- Profession: physician; educator; school board member

Kate Stevens Harpel (October 22, 1867 – May 13, 1950) was an American educator, physician, and civic leader. Born in Illinois, her family moved to Iowa when she was an infant. Harpel began her career as a teacher and high school principal before serving on the Perry board of education. After earning a medical degree from Drake University, she established a medical practice in Boone. Harpel was elected president of the Iowa Society of Medical Women and participated in statewide public health campaigns. She held leadership positions and was active in several civic, professional, and suffrage organizations.

== Early life and education ==
Kate Stevens was born in McHenry County, Illinois, on October 22, 1867. Her parents were Asher M. and Johanna (Chesley) Stevens. Her paternal grandmother, who before marriage was Julia Kellogg, was a granddaughter of an officer of the American Revolution and a member of the Kellogg family, remembered in the history of U.S. and Great Britain.

Harpel was six months old when her family removed to Cerro Gordo County, Iowa, later settling on a farm in Owen Township. Her mother died in 1878, leaving seven children, the youngest of whom was three years old. Kate, with an older sister, did the housework for the family while attending the district school at the same time. She was orphaned at 12 years of age.

At the age of fifteen, Harpel moved to Mason City to attend high school, and lived with her aunt. She was no financial means or assistance except that she had a place where she could work for her board and expenses. She also worked as a supply teacher during her senior year. Despite this outside work, Harpel covered a four years' course in two years, graduating in 1885 as valedictorian.

Upon graduation, she was immediately offered a position in the Mason City public schools and taught fifth grade pupils until 1887, when she entered the Iowa Agriculture College (IAC) in Ames, having saved the means to defray one year's expenses from her teaching. The other three years of her college course were cared for by what she was able to earn while teaching during the winters and by service as assistant college librarian. In 1890, she received the degree of Bachelor of Letters, ranking second in a class of 44.

== Career ==
After graduation, she taught the balance of the school year in the Marshalltown public schools and the next year acted as principal of the Webster City high school. She also served on the Webster City board of education.

In July 1892, she married Llewellyn V. Harpel (d. 1936), an attorney at law, and they lived in Perry for eleven years. Her only son, Gates, was born in 1893.

During her residence in Perry, she filled for six months a vacancy as high-school teacher. In 1895, she was elected by popular election to the Perry school board, and served for three years, wherein she assisted in organizing the Wednesday Study Club, which continued to exist after she left her position on the board. After running again in 1906, Harpel was defeated.

With her husband busy with his law practice, Harpel decided to study medicine. After graduating from the medical department of Drake University, where she was matriculated, she began the regular practice of medicine in 1902 at her home in Perry. A misunderstanding arose in the minds of some from the fact that Harpel took a course of study at the Still College of Osteopathy additional to the regular course of study at the Iowa College of Physicians and Surgeons (Allopath). A newspaper article in The Perry Chief clarified that Harpel would practice medicine and not osteopathy; her studies in osteopathy were only for the purpose to further equip her in means of diagnosis and the judging as to the merits of osteopathy for particular cases, as one of the available remedies.

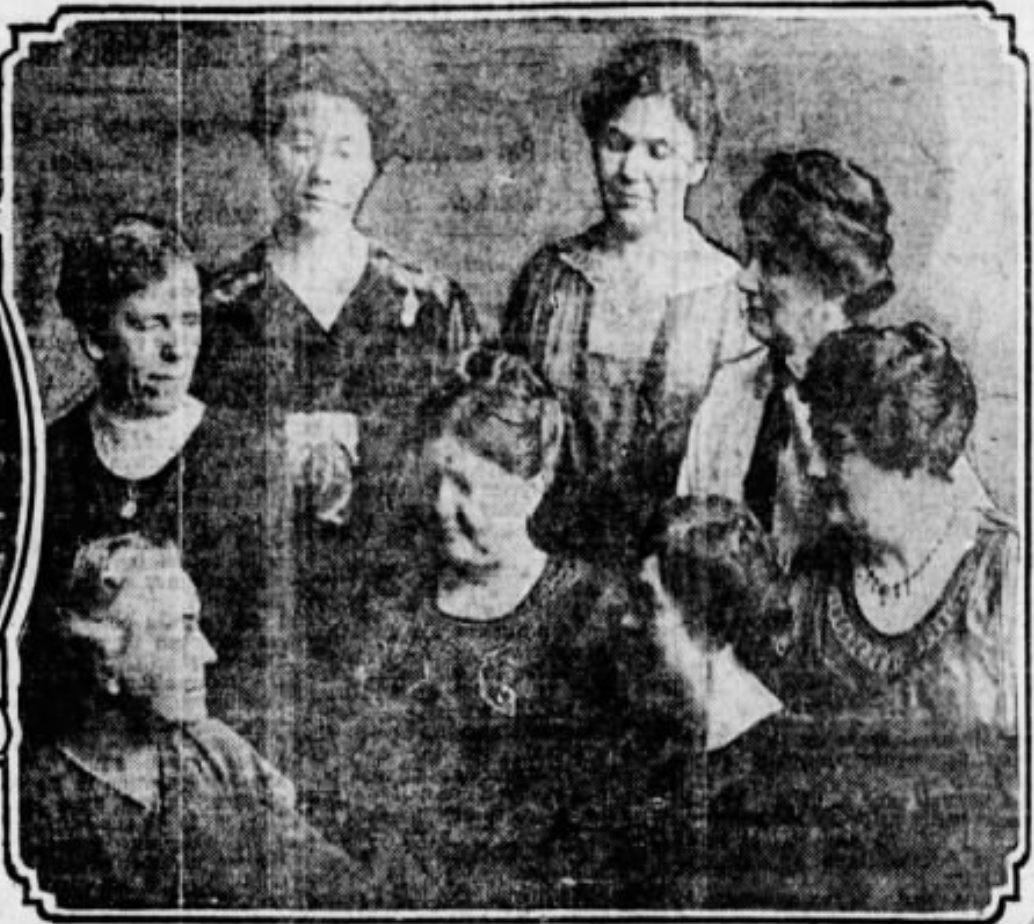
Dr. Harpel, Dr. Jeannette Throckmorton, Dr. Velura Powell, Miss Esse Hathaway (upper row, l-r); Dr. Josephine Rust, Dr. Lenna Meanes, Dr. Nelle Noble, Dr. Mae Habenicht (lower row, l-r) (1919)

Harpel relocated to Boone in 1903. When she started her practice, she made house calls with a horse and buggy, before progressing to the use of a Ford Model T, wearing out six of them. In 1906, she was elected vice-president of the Jasper County Medical Society. Eight years later, she was elected president of the Iowa Society of Medical Women.

Subsequent to World War I, the government asked women to cooperate during January and February 1919 in a campaign for social hygiene. A lecture tour covering Iowa cities of over 10,000 inhabitants was organized and concluded in March in Des Moines. The lecture staff of women physicians included Harpel as well as Dr. Jeannette Throckmorton, Dr. Velura Powell, Dr. Josephine Rust, Dr. Lenna Meanes, Dr. Nelle Noble, and Dr. Mae Habenicht.

Harpel was involved in several organizations. She was a member of the Daughters of the American Revolution, and was active in the Political Equality Club and the Civic League. She was an organizer of the Outlook Club, serving for two years as its president. Harpel was a past commander of the Ladies of the Maccabees and a past Worthy Matron of the Order of the Eastern Star.

Harpel was active in the cause of women's suffrage. She served as the chair of Iowa's Equal Suffrage Association; when the Nineteenth Amendment passed in 1920, Harpel was the organization's vice president.

== Personal life ==
In religion, Harpel was involved in the Universalist Church and engaged in Sunday school work.

Kate Harpel died on May 13, 1950 in Boone, Iowa, with burial in Sheldahl, Iowa.
