= Emma E. Bower =

American physician (1852–1937)

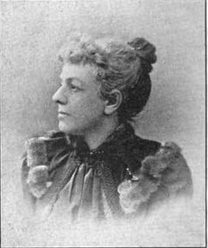
- Photo in Michigan Woman's Press Association, 1893
- Born: 1852; Ann Arbor, Michigan, U.S.
- Died: October 11, 1937 (aged 84–85); Ann Arbor, Michigan, U.S.
- Education: University of Michigan Medical School
- Occupations: Physician, clubwoman, and newspaper owner, publisher, and editor
- Writing career
- Language: English
- Notable works: Ann Arbor Democrat, The Lady Maccabee

Emma E. Bower (1852 – October 11, 1937) was an American physician, and a newspaper owner, publisher, and editor. She was also an active clubwoman. Bower practiced medicine in Detroit, Michigan before returning to Ann Arbor, Michigan where, from 1896 to 1904, she owned, published, and edited a county paper, the Ann Arbor Democrat. For nine years, she was a member of the Ann Arbor board of education, during such time holding the office of president and treasurer. She served as treasurer of the Michigan Woman's Press Association, secretary-treasurer of the Michigan State Fraternal Congress, and held the office of president of the National Fraternal Press Association. She was the Great Record Keeper of the Ladies of the Maccabees (LOTM).

== Early years and education ==
Emma Eliza Bower was born in Ann Arbor, Michigan, 1852. (Note: According to Harley & MacDowell (1995), Bower was born in 1849.) Her father, Henry Bower, was a dry-goods merchant of Ann Arbor for many years and in later life was a publisher in the newspaper field. Her mother, the former Margaret Gertrude Chase, was a native of New York. In the family were six children: Henry E. H., Emma E., Margaret V., Charles, Dwight, and Burroughs Frank.

Bower attended public-school in Ann Arbor, and after completing her more specifically literary education entered the University of Michigan Medical School, from which she was graduated in 1883.

== Career ==
Believing that the city offered the largest field for usefulness, Bower took up her residence in Detroit, Michigan, where she enjoyed a successful practice as assistant physician for two years. At the end of that time, a serious illness in her father's family caused her to give up her practice and return home to assist her family.

The Ann Arbor Democrat was founded in September, 1878, by her brother, B. Frank Bower and Col. John L. Burleigh, young Bower being its editor, but four years later he accepted a daily newspaper position in Detroit, and his brother, Henry E. H. Bower, became editor-in-chief of the Democrat, and was assisted in his editorial work by his sister, Emma. His failing health threw more and more of the work upon her, and upon his death, April 30, 1888, she took full possession and had absolute control of the paper thereafter. She did all the work of an editor-in-chief, collected and wrote up all the news, solicited advertisements, personally attended to all the departments of the paper and never failed to send out a number every Friday in the year.

Bower served as the lady commander of Arbor Hive No. 113, LOTM. In 1893, she was elected to the office of Great Record Keeper of the LOTM., an organization with a membership of 86,000, with headquarters in Ann Arbor. In this position, she had 30 assistants, and with them, published a club newspaper, The Lady Maccabee. Established in 1890, Bower served as editor of The Lady Maccabee, was published by The Inland Press, and had a circulation average during 1896 of more than 31,000, and in 1897, of more than 35,000. She was also involved with the Secretaries' Association, an auxiliary of the National Fraternal Congress, which was composed of over fifty of the leading fraternal beneficiary societies

In September, 1894, Bower was elected a member of the Ann Arbor school board and served as president, secretary and treasurer.

== Affiliations ==
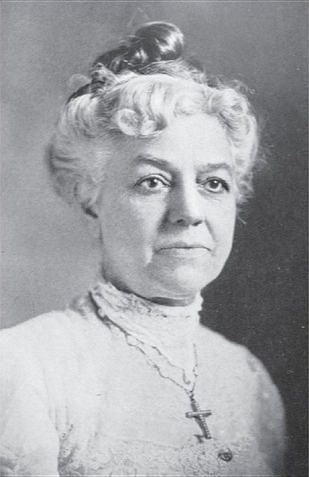
Emma E. Bower

Bower was a member of the Michigan Woman's Press Association and served on its executive committee; secretary and treasurer of the Michigan Fraternal Congress; president of the National Fraternal Press Association; vice president, "The Homeopathic Alumni of the University of Michigan; and vice president of the International Council of Women. She co-founded the Political Equality Club of Ann Arbor.

She was the superintendent of Legislation and Petition of the Michigan State Woman's Christian Temperance Union, Second District; and senior vice-president of the Woman's Relief Corps No. 218. She was a member of the Order of the Eastern Star; the Rebekahs; and citizens' reception committee to entertain the State Legislature in March, 1893.

== Personal life ==
Bower favored suffrage. She made her home in Port Huron, Michigan. Religiously, she was a life-long member of St. Andrew's Episcopal Church. Bower died at Ann Arbor on October 11, 1937.
