= Mary K. Buck =

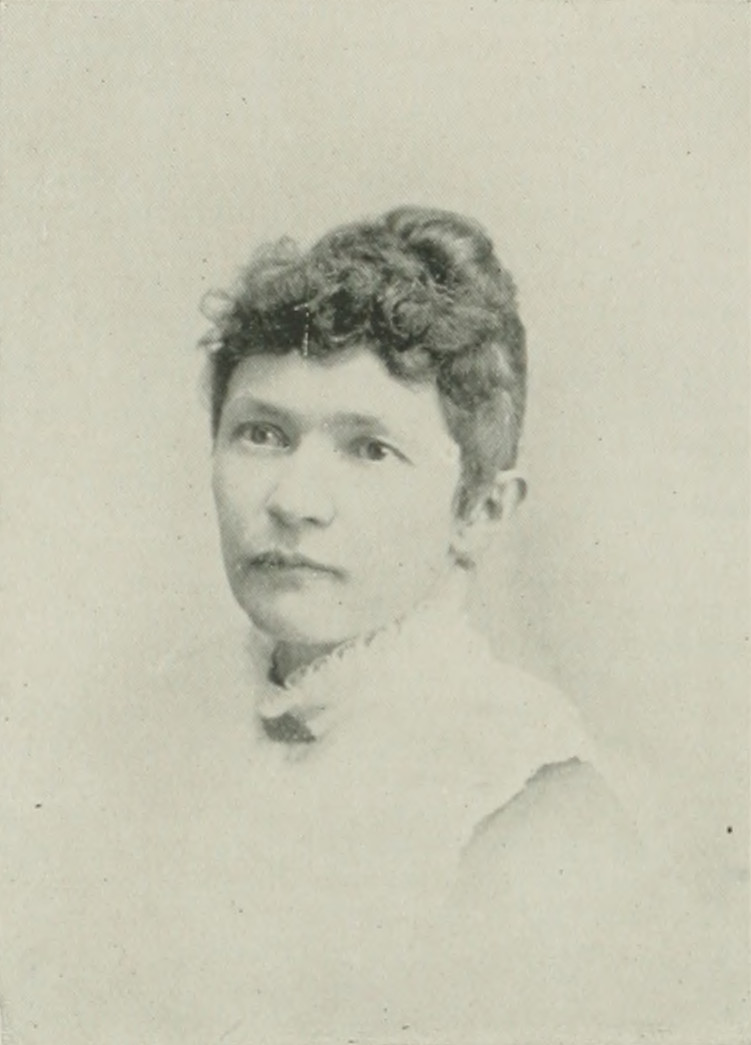
- Photo in A Woman of the Century
- Born: Marjánka Knížková; April 1, 1849 Ondreor, Bohemia
- Died: 28 December 1901 (aged 52) Traverse City, Michigan, U.S.
- Occupation: Short story writer
- Spouse: Charles Kimball Buck (m. 1874)
- Children: 3

Signature
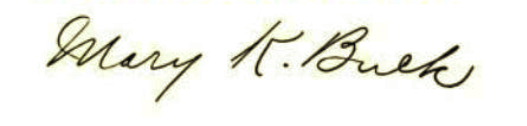

Mary K. Buck (née Knížková; 1849–1901) was a Bohemian-born American author. Independently and collaboratively, she authored two books, as well as being a contributor of fiction and essays to periodicals. An officer of the Michigan Woman's Press Association, Buck was active in literary and women’s organizations, and cultural and civic groups.

== Early life and education ==
Marjánka Knížková was born in Ondreor, Bohemia, April 1, 1849. Her parents, Josef Knížek (1819–1902) and Anna (Janoušková) Knížková (1828–?), emigrated to the U.S. when Mary was five years old and for several years, lived in New York City, where she went to school and acquired her knowledge of the English language. From New York, they removed to Traverse City, Michigan, which thereafter was her home.

From childhood, she was fond of books, reading eagerly whatever came to hand. English books were rare in her family home, but the town library, of which she was a patron, was well stocked. Early in life, she developed a talent for composition, especially of fiction, which was encouraged by her teachers and friends.

== Career ==
On June 7, 1874, in Traverse City, she married Charles Kimball Buck (1851–1906). They had three children. She was a shrewd business woman working dailly in her husband's office.

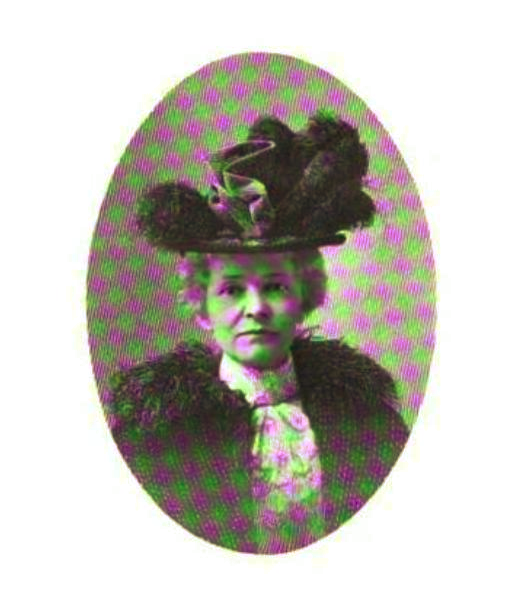
(undated)

Buck wrote much for publication. During the summer of 1891, she published, together with M. E. C. Bates, a book of short sketches entitled Along Traverse Shores. She contributed to the Congregationalist, the Advance, the Chicago Inter Ocean , the Portland Transcript, Good Housekeeping, St. Nicholas, and many other periodicals. Her husband published Songs of the Northland in 1902.

Buck was always interested in the advancement of women. In 1901, she served as vice-president of the Michigan Woman's Press Association. She was also a member of the Woman's Club, the Ladies' Literary Association, and the city library committee.

== Death ==
Mary K. Buck died of diabetes in Traverse City, Michigan, December 28, 1901.

== Selected works ==
- Along Traverse Shores, 1891 (with M. E. C. Bates)
- Songs from the Northland, 1902
