= Detroit Tribune =

Newspaper in Detroit, Michigan

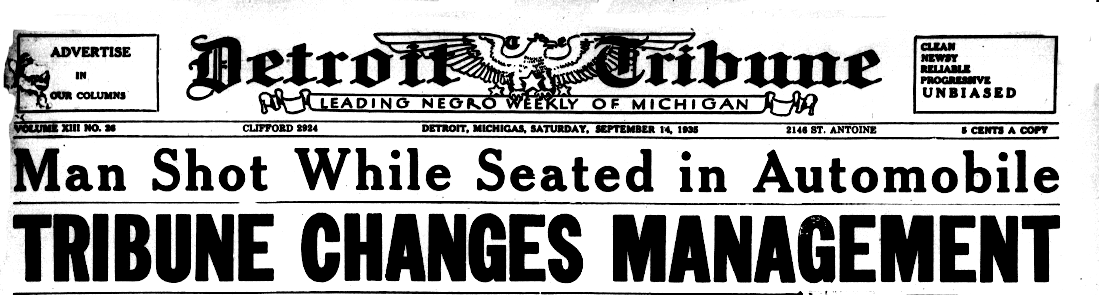
September 14, 1935 masthead

The Detroit Tribune was a newspaper in Detroit. It started as the Daily Tribune in 1849 and used the name until 1862, the same year the Tribune joined with the (Detroit) Daily Advertiser which then absorbed other papers, becoming the Advertiser and Tribune.

The newspaper acquired new management, including James E. Scripps, future founder of the Detroit News. In 1877, the Advertiser and Tribune merged with the 11-year-old Detroit Daily Post and became the Post and Tribune. In 1884 after more ownership changes the name was changed to the Daily Post. In 1885, the name was changed again to the Tribune.

In 1891, Scripps bought the remaining stock in the Tribune to secure an Associated Press connection. Scripps continued to run the Tribune as a morning paper until February 1, 1915 when it was merged with the News. The Tribune name was used on a Sunday paper, The Sunday News-Tribune, until October 15, 1917, when the name was changed to The Sunday News and the Tribune name was dropped completely.

== Detroit Tribune (weekly) ==
The weekly Detroit Tribune, published from 4864 Woodward Avenue in Detroit, published weekly from 1935 to 1966. Occasionally subtitled "Unswerving Dedication to the Truth" or "The Newsjournal of the Metropolitan Community"

The Detroit Tribune was the successor to the Tribune Independent of Michigan, itself the product of the 1933 merger of the Detroit Tribune (published only in 1933 from 2146 St. Antoine Street with the subhead "Leading Negro Weekly of Michigan") and the Detroit Independent (established 1907).

In April 1952, Andrew Fruehauf, heir to the Fruehauf Trailer Corporation, offered a bid of $15,000 to purchase a bankrupt newspaper, the Detroit Tribune. The Tribune was Michigan's oldest existing Negro newspaper and was put up for public auction in an attempt to clear up some of its accumulated debt. Fruehauf was the chief stockholder in the Midwest Publishing Company that happened to own the Tribune. A devout Christian Scientist, he dreamt about converting the paper into a Negro counterpart of the Christian Science Monitor. He won his bid and became publisher and served in that capacity until his death in December 1965. He devoted the last years of his life to the paper, promoting and encouraging the aspirations of Black Americans. A huge congregation of the friends he had made in the Black community attended his funeral.

The Afro American featured his obituary, which may have shocked his relatives on February 12, 1966: "The entire estate of Andrew Fruehauf, member of the wealthy trucking family, has been left in trust for the perpetuation of the Detroit Tribune, Michigan's oldest colored weekly newspaper. Fruehauf, who died December 4, 1965, in a will dated October 12, 1960, requested that his estate, now estimated to be in excess of a half million dollars, be left to the newspaper as long as it reflects the aspirations of colored Americans in the community. Fruehauf, who for more than a decade sponsored the newspaper, insisted that it carry on its pages material advocating the philosophy of the Christian Science movement of which he was a devoted believer."

== Notable people ==
- Martha E. Cram Bates (1839–1905), writer, journalist, newspaper editor
