= Ella Eaton Kellogg =

American philanthropist, pioneer in dietetics, editor (1853–1920)

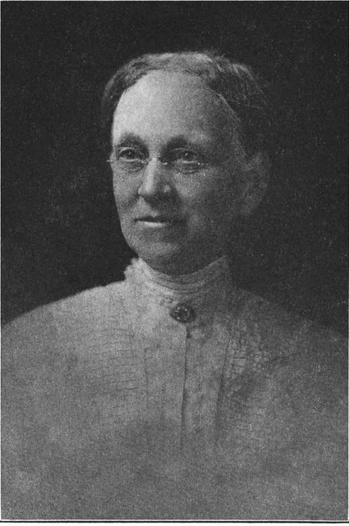
- Born: Ella Ervilla Eaton; April 7, 1853; Alfred, New York, U.S.
- Died: June 14, 1920 (aged 67); Battle Creek, Michigan
- Education: Alfred University
- Occupation: Pioneer in dietetics
- Spouse: John Harvey Kellogg (m. 1879)
- Writing career
- Notable work: Science in the Kitchen

Ella Eaton Kellogg (April 7, 1853 – June 14, 1920) was an American dietitian known for her work on home economics and vegetarian cooking. She was educated at Alfred University (B.A. 1872, A.M. 1875); and the American School Household Economics (1909). In 1875, Kellogg visited the Battle Creek Sanitarium, became interested in the subjects of sanitation and hygiene, and a year later enrolled in the Sanitarium School of Hygiene. Later on, she joined the editorial staff of Good Health magazine, and in 1879, married Dr. John Harvey Kellogg, superintendent of the Battle Creek Sanitarium.

Kellogg was prominently identified with the Woman's Christian Temperance Union (WCTU), in 1882 being appointed national superintendent of the Department of Hygiene. Three years later, she was appointed associate superintendent of the Social Purity department of the WCTU. Out of her experiences in the Social Purity work in the WCTU, grew a pamphlet, in 1890, entitled "Talks to Girls" which enjoyed an extended circulation. Other books written by Kellogg included Studies in Character Building (1905), and Science in the Kitchen (1892). Kellogg was a charter member of the Michigan Woman's Press Association.

== Early life and education ==
Ella Ervilla Eaton was born in 1853, in Alfred, New York. She was of Puritan ancestry. Her father, Joseph Clarke Eaton, traced his direct descent from John Eaton, an English pioneer, who, with Abigail, his wife, came to the United States from England in 1635 and settled in Dedham, Massachusetts. Her mother was Hannah Sophia (Coon) Eaton.

Kellogg attended the local schools before going to Alfred University, being continually in school, with the exception of one term of teaching, until her graduation at the age of 19, when she received the degree of A. L. (Laureate of Arts.). During her school life, she was an active member of the Alfredian Lyceum, one of the four literary societies of the university, taking many prominent places upon the programme of its public sessions. She was also for some time one of the editors of the Alfred Student, a college paper, and probably in the congenial atmosphere of these youthful experiences received her first inclination toward literary work. Being a quick and ready pupil, she was always in advance of those of her own age, and at her graduation was the youngest pupil who had ever won equal honors at that university.

== Career ==
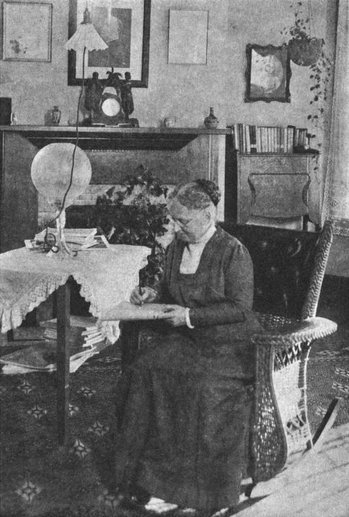
Ella Eaton Kellogg at work

The year following graduation was spent in teaching at a community school in Harmony, New Jersey, and then post-graduate work in the study of languages, particularly Latin, German, as well as music and drawing, and at the university commencement of 1875 she was given another degree, that of A. M. The young woman was, up to this time, planning to devote herself to teaching as a profession, but a visit to the Battle Creek Sanitarium in the summer of 1877 seems to have given an unconscious viewpoint to all her subsequent life.

After teaching in the school for three years, she left the school in order to help her aunt, who was ill, receiving help from the Battle Creek Sanitarium. During an epidemic of typhoid fever that occurred in the neighborhood during the early autumn, the number of patients being so great that trained nurses could not be obtained for them, she volunteered her services and carried safely through the disease several of the most critical cases. This experience led her to become interested in sanitary and hygienic subjects, and in the following year, she entered the Sanitarium School of Hygiene, in which she obtained a knowledge of anatomy, physiology, hygiene, and the practical care of the sick. The principal of the School of Hygiene, who was also the editor of Good Health, soon discovered her capabilities, and engaged her services as an editorial assistant. On February 22, 1879, she married John Harvey Kellogg, M.D., the president and superintendent of the Battle Creek Sanitarium.

At the national convention of the WCTU in Detroit in 1882, Kellogg was elected national superintendent of the department of hygiene, a position involving, among other duties, that of preparing and publishing a syllabus of lessons, together with the holding, from time to time, of numerous "health institutes" in different portions of the country.

In 1884, was instituted the Sanitarium Experimental Kitchen, a work demanding her constant personal supervision, undertaken in the interest of dietetic reform and the vegetarian cuisine of the Sanitarium, to prepare a thoroughly hygienic, yet ever-varying, attractive and appetizing menu for its guests, but which soon outgrew its bounds. From it evolved a distinct School of Domestic Economy, and an altogether new system of household cookery, besides a continued succession of cooking classes whose enthusiastic members became teachers to propagate the principles learned, and to teach a better way in diet.

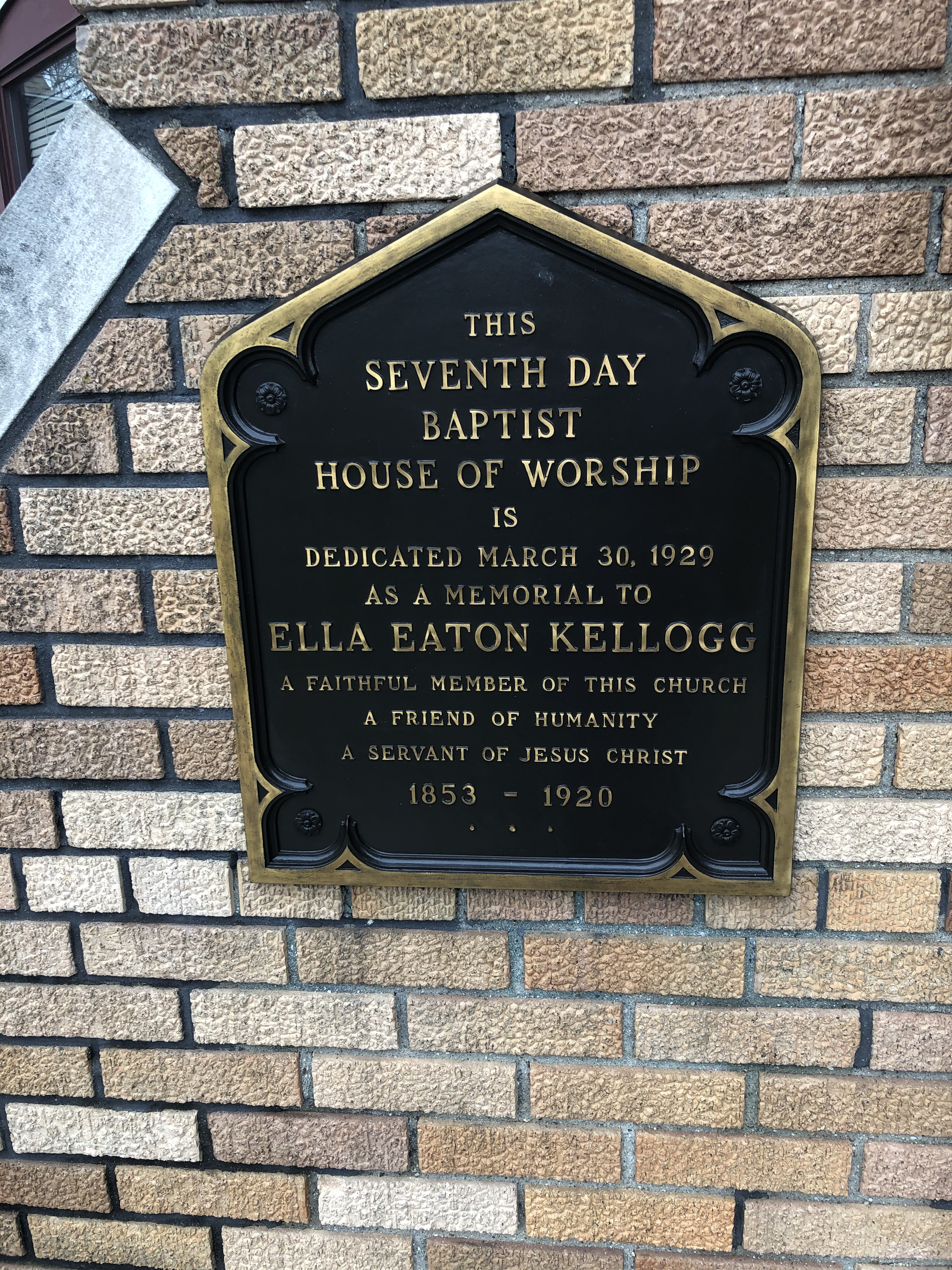
Plaque at Seventh Day Baptist Church in Battle Creek

The following year, in 1885, Kellogg became the associate superintendent of the social purity department of the National WCTU, in connection with Frances E. Willard. Her special charge was the department of Mothers' Meetings, and to her fell the task of arranging the plans of work and the preparing of topics for study.

She founded the School of Home Economics (later Battle Creek College). Working with the School of Domestic Economy founded by her and her husband, and other organizations, Kellogg wrote several books, including Science in the Kitchen. Science in the Kitchen, an illustrated cookbook of nearly 600 pages, was the outcome of the scientific and experimental investigation of Kellogg in the realm of dietetics, carried forward during a period of years. "Talks to Girls," a social purity pamphlet having a wide sale, was written in 1890.

The Kelloggs had no children of their own, but they adopted 12 children and raised several not adopted. She was one of the founders and for years manager of the Haskell Home for Orphan Children.

Kellogg, during the year, 1892, was named chairman of the World's Fair committee on food supplies for Michigan. She was a charter member and honorary president of the Michigan Women's Press Association; and a charter member of the American Dietetic Association. She was a member of the household economics department of the Federation of Women's Clubs. She was a member of the WCTU, Y.W.C.A., National Congress of Mothers, American Home Economic Association, and Woman's League,

== Personal life ==
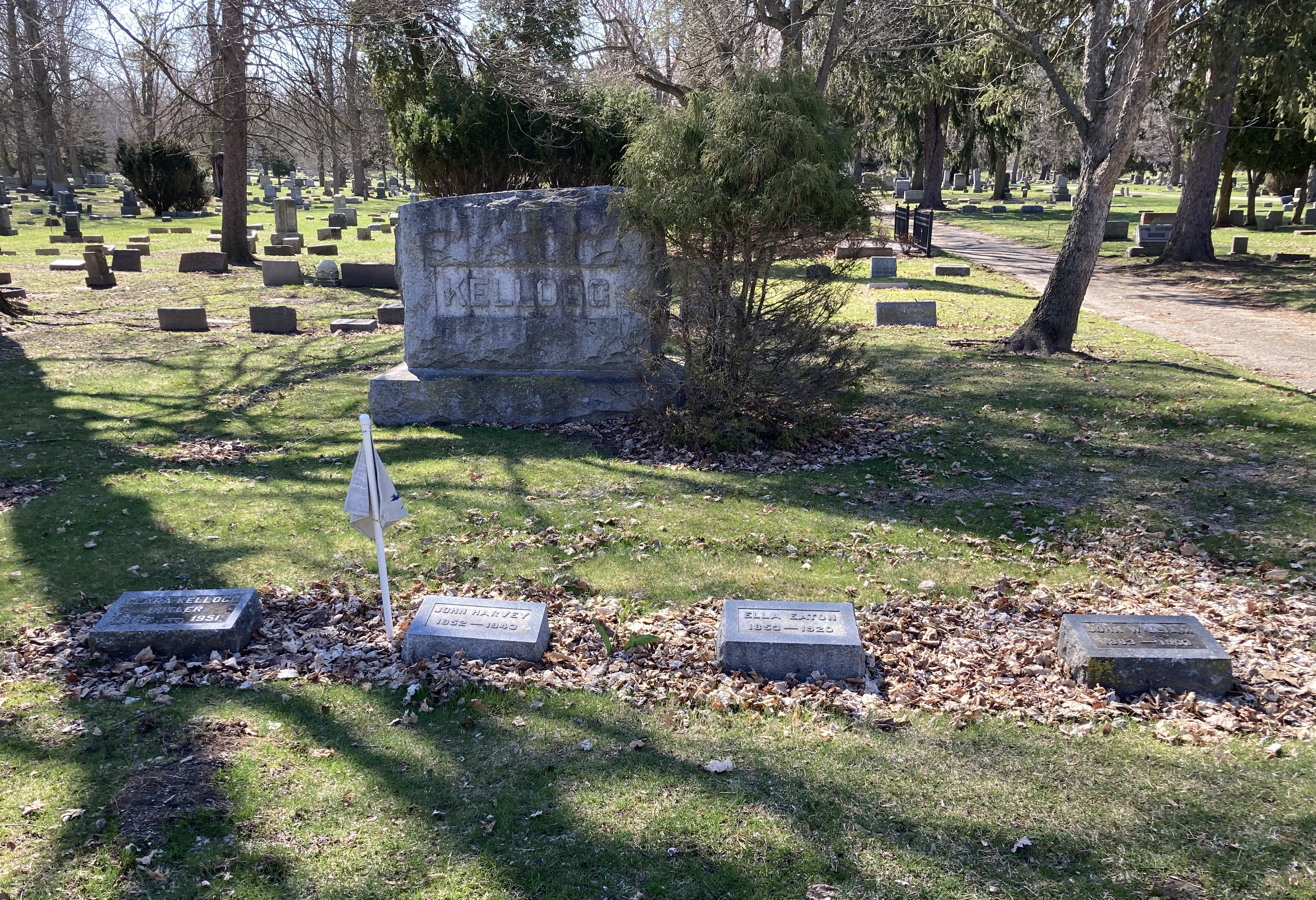
Kellogg's grave (third from left) at Oak Hill Cemetery

Kellogg favored woman suffrage. In religion, she was a lifelong Seventh Day Baptist. The Battle Creek Seventh Day Baptist Church building in Battle Creek, Michigan was dedicated in her honor after it was built in 1929 as seen by a plaque hanging on the outside of their church. Her portrait hangs inside right by the sanctuary. She traveled in Europe, made two trips to Mexico, and visited Cuba, Puerto Rico, California, Colorado, and Florida.

She died in Battle Creek on June 14, 1920, and was buried there at Oak Hill Cemetery.

== Selected works ==
- Every-Day Dishes and Every-Day Work (1897)
- Science in the Kitchen (1898)
- Healthful Cookery (1904)
- Studies in Character Building: A Book for Parents (1905)
- The Good Health Birthday Book: A Health Thought for Each Day (1907)
