= Second Annual Meeting of the National Woman's Christian Temperance Union =

- Status: Active
- Genre: Conference
- Date: November 17-19, 1875
- Frequency: Annually
- Venue: St. Paul's Methodist Episcopal church
- Locations: Cincinnati, Ohio, U.S.
- Most recent: 150th Annual N.W.C.T.U. Convention, Reno, Nevada, August 2023
- Previous event: First Woman's National Temperance Convention, Cleveland, Ohio, November 1874
- Next event: 1876, Newark, New Jersey
- Area: United States
- Major events: Temperance movement in the United States
- Leader: President, Annie Turner Wittenmyer

The Second Annual Meeting of the National Woman's Christian Temperance Union (N.W.C.T.U.) was held in St. Paul's Methodist Episcopal church, Cincinnati, Ohio, November 17-19, 1875.

== Background ==
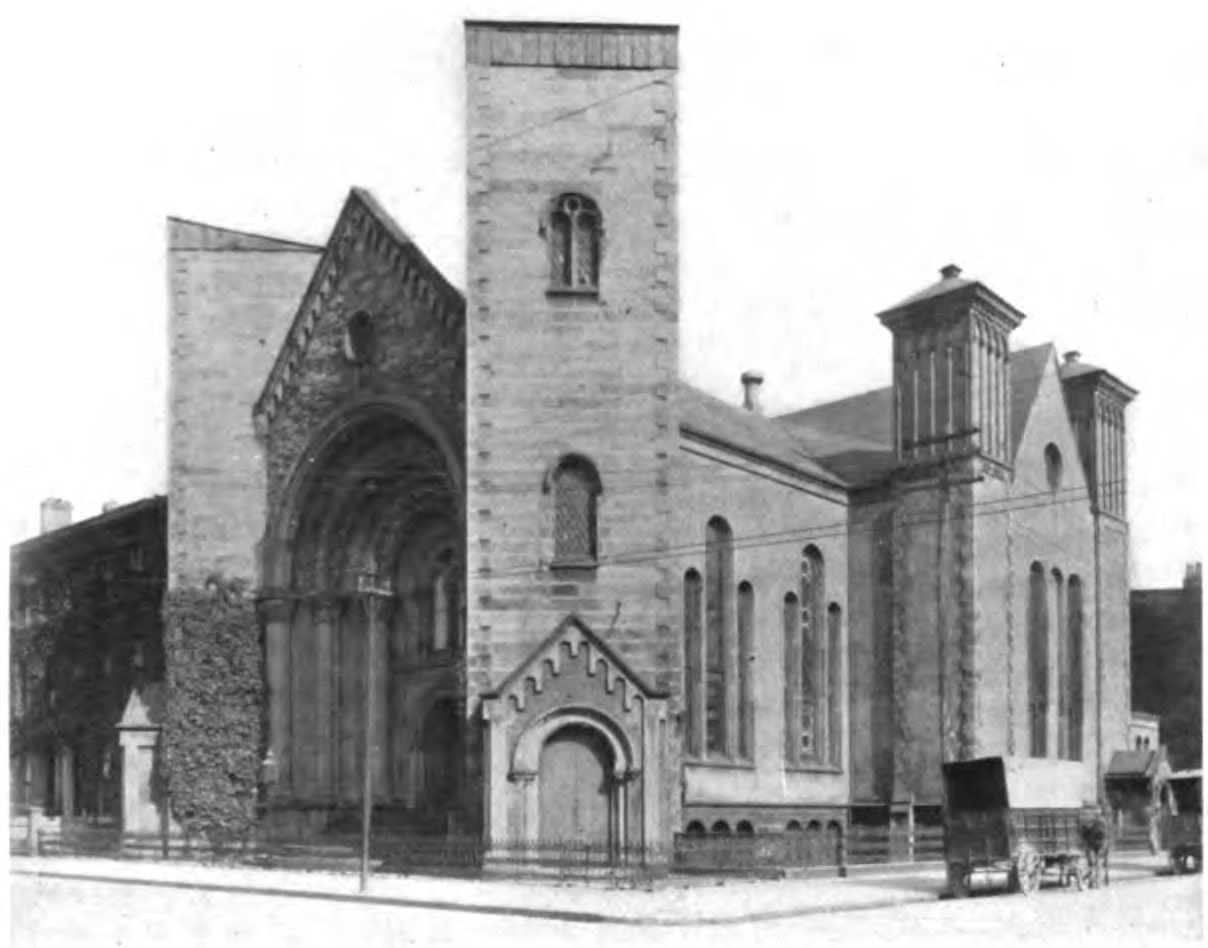
St. Paul Episcopal Cathedral (Cincinnati)

After the success of the First Woman's National Temperance Convention, in Cleveland, Ohio, in November 1874, the Second Annual meeting of the N.W.C.T.U. was convened 12 months later in Cincinnati's St. Paul's Methodist Episcopal church. Certain precedents seem to have been established and certain customs were adopted in the convention of 1875. Introductions of fraternal delegates and of kindred organizations may be noted. For example, the National Temperance Society of New York was represented by John Newton Stearns (1829-1895), and the woman's work in Canada, by Letitia Youmans, who was invited to meet with the Committee for International Convention. It was recorded that Stearns "spoke with warmth and fervor of the Women's Crusade and its results. He referred to the dearth of temperance literature prior to the present work of women. He stated that women are now writing three-fourths of the temperance tracts and books, his society having paid US$5,000 to women for the work of their pens in this behalf".

At this convention also the women of New Jersey, through one of their delegates, Mary R. Denman, asked that the members of the N.W.C.T.U. join with them in silent prayer in their mid-day meeting. This was the establishment of the organization's noon-time prayer.

== Elected officers ==
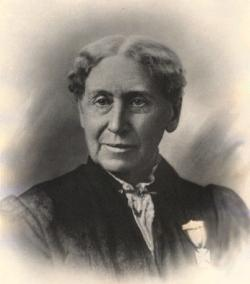
Annie Turner Wittenmyer, President

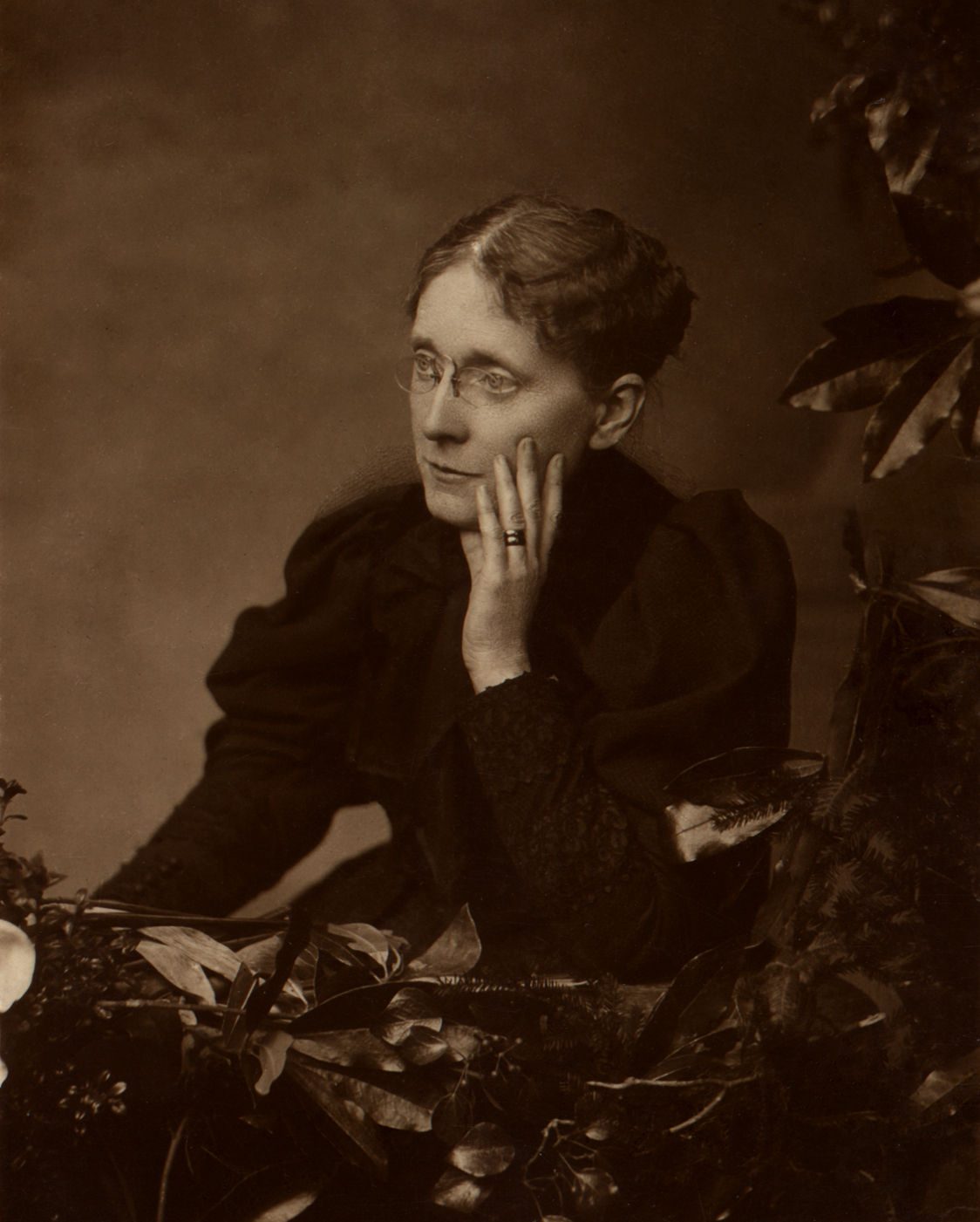
Frances Willard, Corresponding secretary

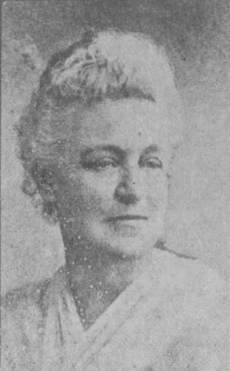
Mary Coffin Johnson, Recording secretary

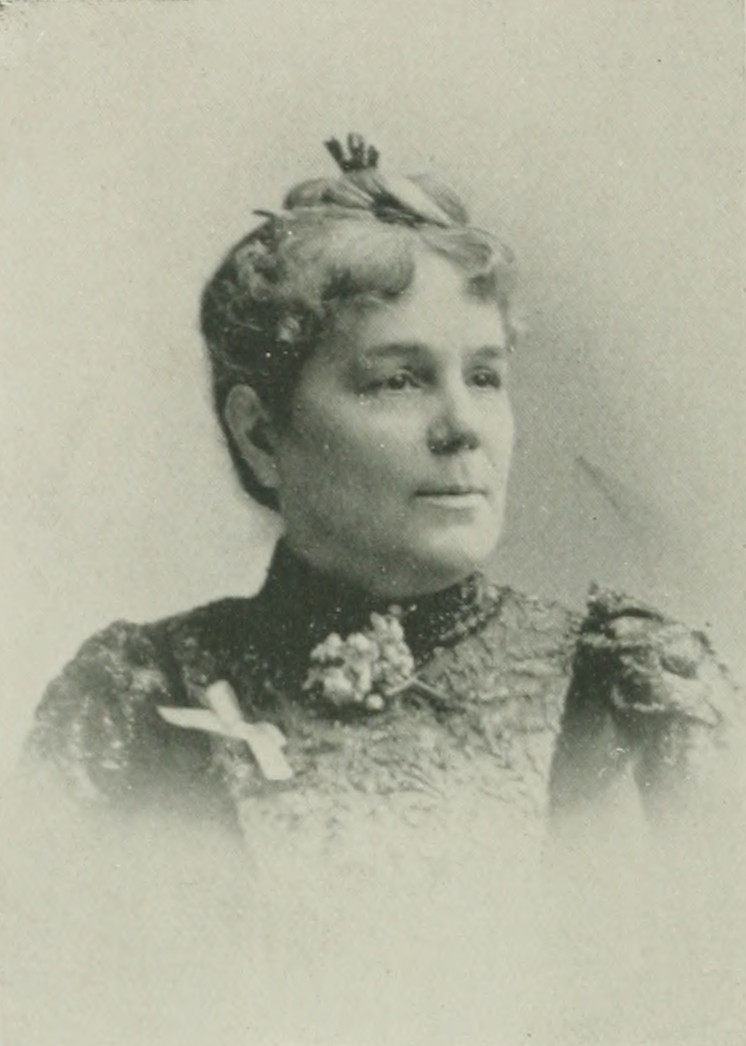
Mary Towne Burt, Assistant recording secretary

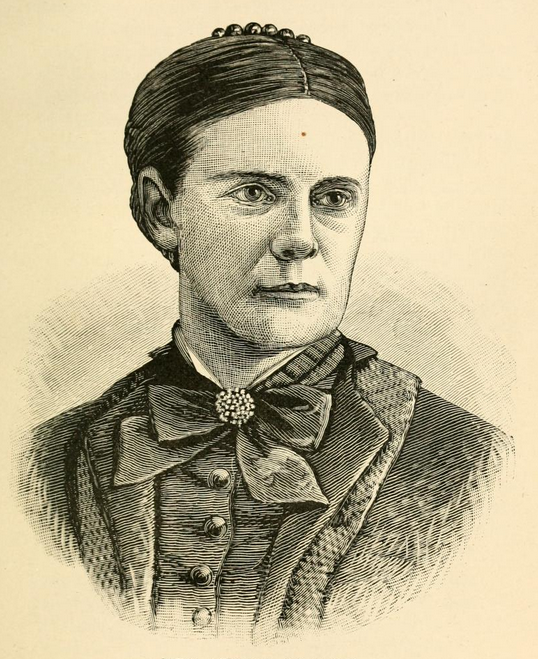
Abby Fisher Leavitt, Treasurer

The following list of officers was elected, all by acclamation and unanimous vote: President, Annie Turner Wittenmyer; corresponding secretary, Frances Willard; recording secretary, Mary Coffin Johnson; assistant recording secretary, Mary Towne Burt; treasurer, Abby Fisher Leavitt.

== Reports ==
The report of the corresponding secretary shows that there were 21 states auxiliary to the National society, but the report of the treasurer shows clearly that the basis of auxiliaryship at that early day was not a financial one, since nine only of the 21 states had paid dues into the National treasury, and the entire sum received for the year had been but US$381.83.

Important reports were given by Wittenmyer relative to the work done preparatory to the Centennial Exposition, and a memorial against the sale of intoxicating liquors on the Exposition grounds was unanimously adopted. S. M. I. Henry gave a report on Juvenile work which anticipated many of the methods afterward adopted by the Loyal Temperance Legion.

== Resolutions ==
The object of the N.W.C.T.U., as expressed in the original preamble to the plan of work was to unite the efforts of Christian women for the extinction of intemperance; and this object was more explicitly defined by the second National Convention, as follows:

RESOLVED, That whereas, the object of just government is to conserve the best interests of the governed; and whereas, the liquor traffic is not only a crime against God but subversive of every interest of society; therefore, in behalf of humanity, we call for such legislation as shall secure this end; and while we will continue to employ all moral agencies as indispensable, we hold Prohibition to be essential to the full triumph of this reform."

Zerelda G. Wallace of Indiana was chair of the Committee on Resolutions, and it is notable that the following resolution was passed, apparently without discussion:

RESOLVED, That since women are the greatest sufferers from the liquor traffic, and realizing that it is to be ultimately suppressed by means of the ballot, we, the Christian women of this land, in convention assembled, do pray Almighty God, and all good and true men, that the question of the prohibition of the liquor traffic shall be submitted to all adult citizens, irrespective of race, color or sex.

The existence of an official organ, The Woman's Temperance Union, was announced, and the cooperation of the entire organization was urged, by a resolution drafted by the Committee on Publication Interests:

Whereas, The paper published by the National Temperance Union as its organ is one of the strongest bonds to hold together our interests in separate localities, devoted as it is to our work,
Resolved, That we, as delegates, pledge ourselves a certain number of subscribers in our several states, and in case of failure, to raise money to cover the amount subscribed.

== Committees ==
The following committees were appointed: (a) Resolutions; (b) Juvenile Work; (c) Young Ladies' Leagues; (d) Lecture Bureau; (e) Medical Commission; (f) Bible Wines; (g) Visitation to Medical Associations and to Representative Religious Bodies; (h) Publication Interests; (1) Finance; and (j) International Convention.

Of the special committees appointed at the First Woman's National Temperance Convention, Wittenmyer reported that 10,000 copies of the Memorial to the United States Congress had been printed and distributed throughout the country. "They were speedily returned and the signatures counted until 40,000 were reached; but when the memorials were returned, measuring from 50–100 feet (15–30 m), the counting was discontinued, and they were marked "uncounted thousands". The document was taken to Washington, D.C. early in February 1975 and presented to the United States Senate by Senator Oliver P. Morton of Indiana. It was referred to the Committee on Finance, and both Wittenmyer and Mrs. Sidmore of Washington spoke before that Committee. The Committee reported favorably, but the Senate adjourned before the business was reached.

== Telegrams ==
The following telegram was received from the American Woman Suffrage Association , in session in Steinway Hall, New York City:

Frances E. Willard, Secretary Woman's National Temperance Convention: The American Woman's Suffrage Association bids your convention God-speed. Soon may women, armed with the ballot, help make the laws which concern human welfare.

MARY A. LIVERMORE, President.
LUCY STONE, Chairman Ex. Com.

Mother Thompson and Miss Willard were appointed a committee to reply to this telegram, and they sent the following characteristic answer:

The W. N. C. T. U. returns your kindly greeting and in Christian faith and charity abides God's will awaiting His future providence.

== Notable people ==
- Mary Towne Burt
- Mary R. Denman
- S. M. I. Henry
- Mary Coffin Johnson
- Abby Fisher Leavitt
- John Newton Stearns
- Mother Thompson
- Zerelda G. Wallace
- Frances Willard
- Annie Turner Wittenmyer
- Letitia Youmans

== See also ==
- First Woman's National Temperance Convention (1874)
- Third Annual Meeting of the National Woman's Christian Temperance Union (1876)
