= First Woman's National Temperance Convention =

The First Woman's National Temperance Convention was a founding event in the establishment of the American Woman's Christian Temperance Union (WCTU).

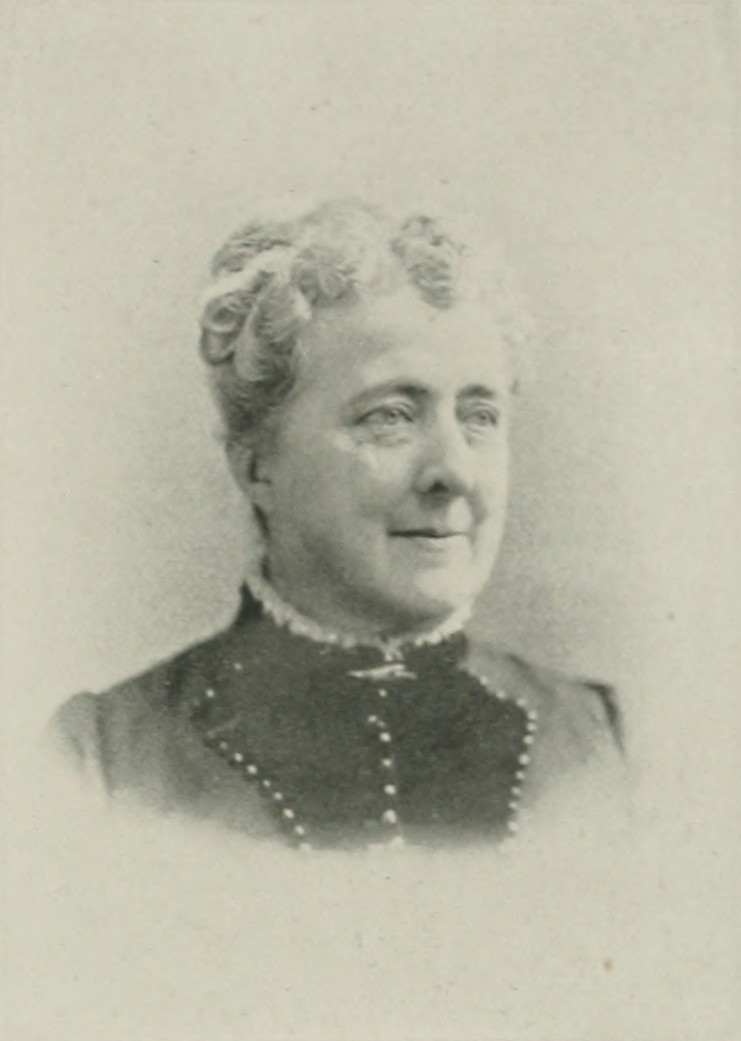
Jennie Fowler Willing

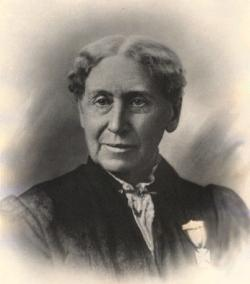
Annie Turner Wittenmyer

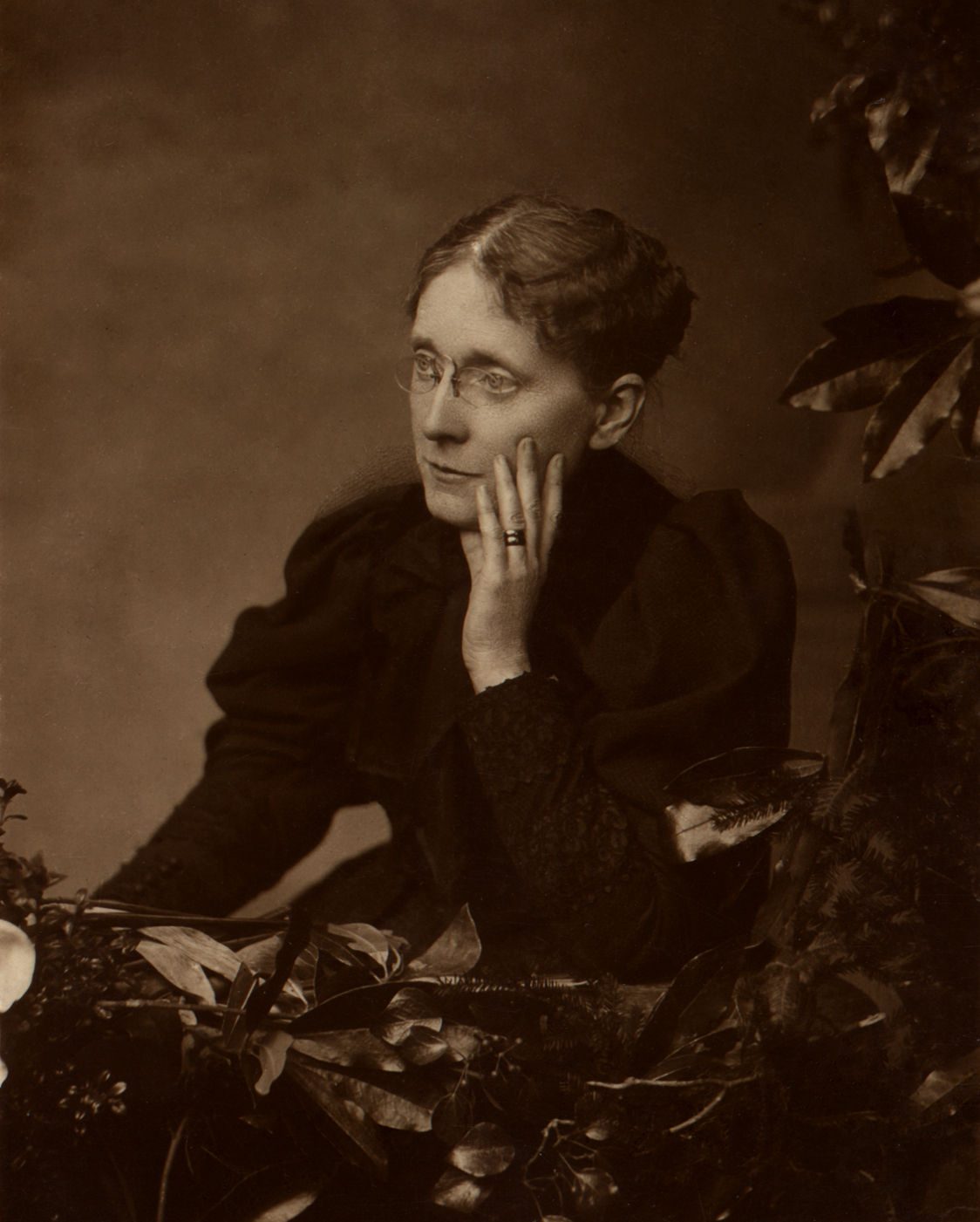
Frances Willard

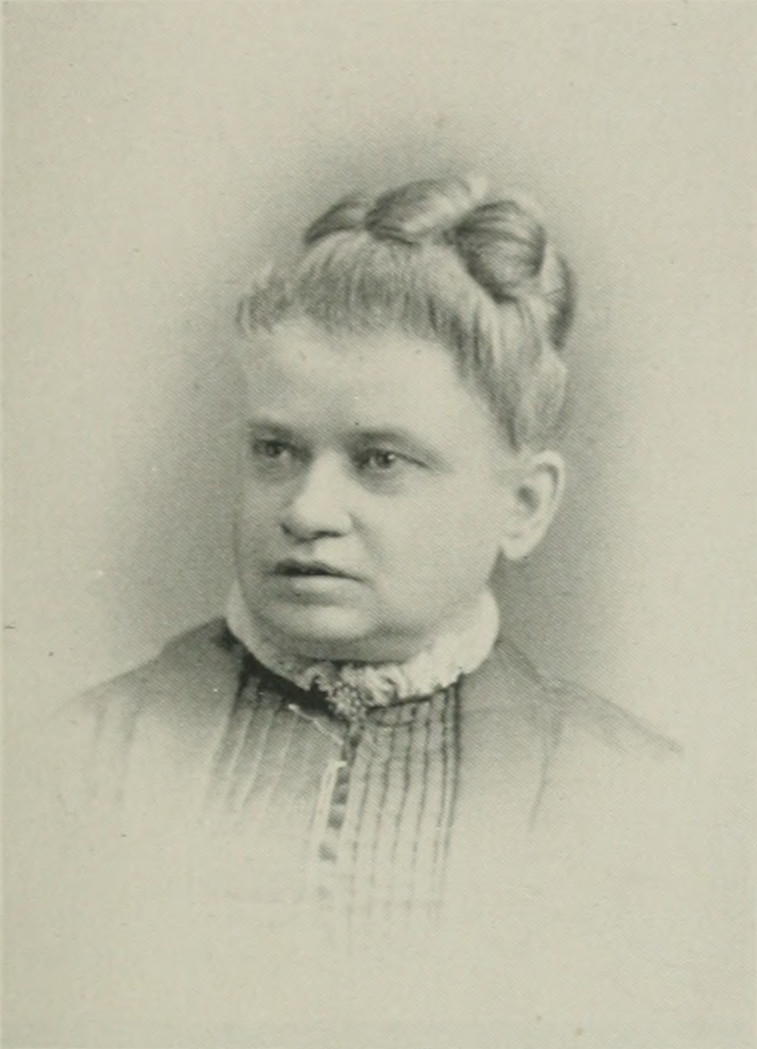
Mary Bigelow Ingham

In November 1874, a Woman's National Temperance Convention was held in Cleveland, Ohio, at which Jennie Fowler Willing presided, and to whose efforts this national organization is chiefly due. At this convention a constitution was adopted, and a plan of organization projected, which was to reach every city, town, and hamlet in the United States. Appeals to the women and girls of America, a letter to other countries, and a memorial to Congress, were in order. A national temperance paper, to be edited and published by women, was projected, whose financial basis was US$.01 per week, to be given by all the members of the Union. A special committee was appointed on temperance work, among the children.

The permanent officers of the society then organized were, Annie Turner Wittenmyer, President; Frances Willard, Corresponding Secretary; Mary Coffin Johnson, Recording Secretary; Mary Bigelow Ingham, Treasurer; with one vice-president from each of the States represented in the convention. The spirit of this assembly was shown in the closing resolutions adopted.

== Background ==
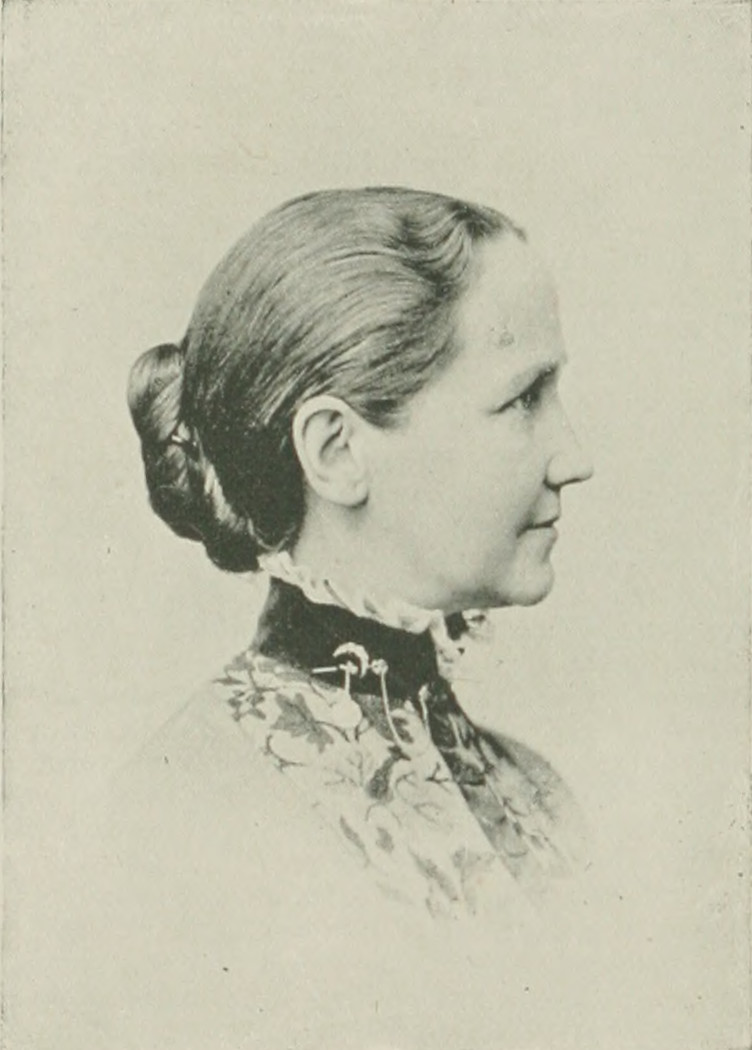
Martha McClellan Brown

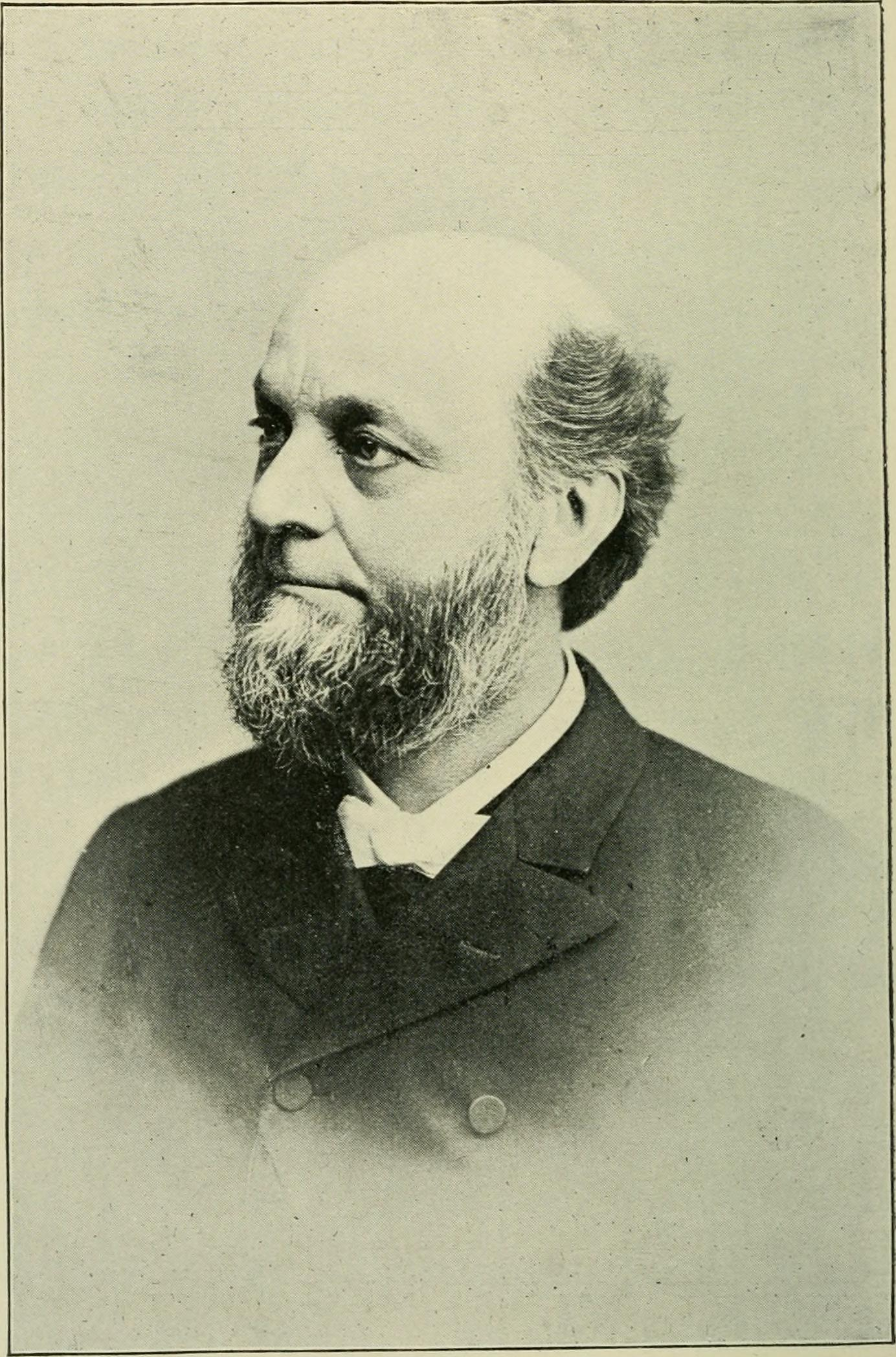
Rev. John H. Vincent

In the spring of 1874, the women who had been crusading in half a dozen States, notably in Ohio, Indiana, and Pennsylvania, called a convention for consultation, which resulted in State Temperance Leagues. The name was, however, soon changed to “Union," the latter word better emphasizing the non-sectarian spirit of the Women's Crusade.

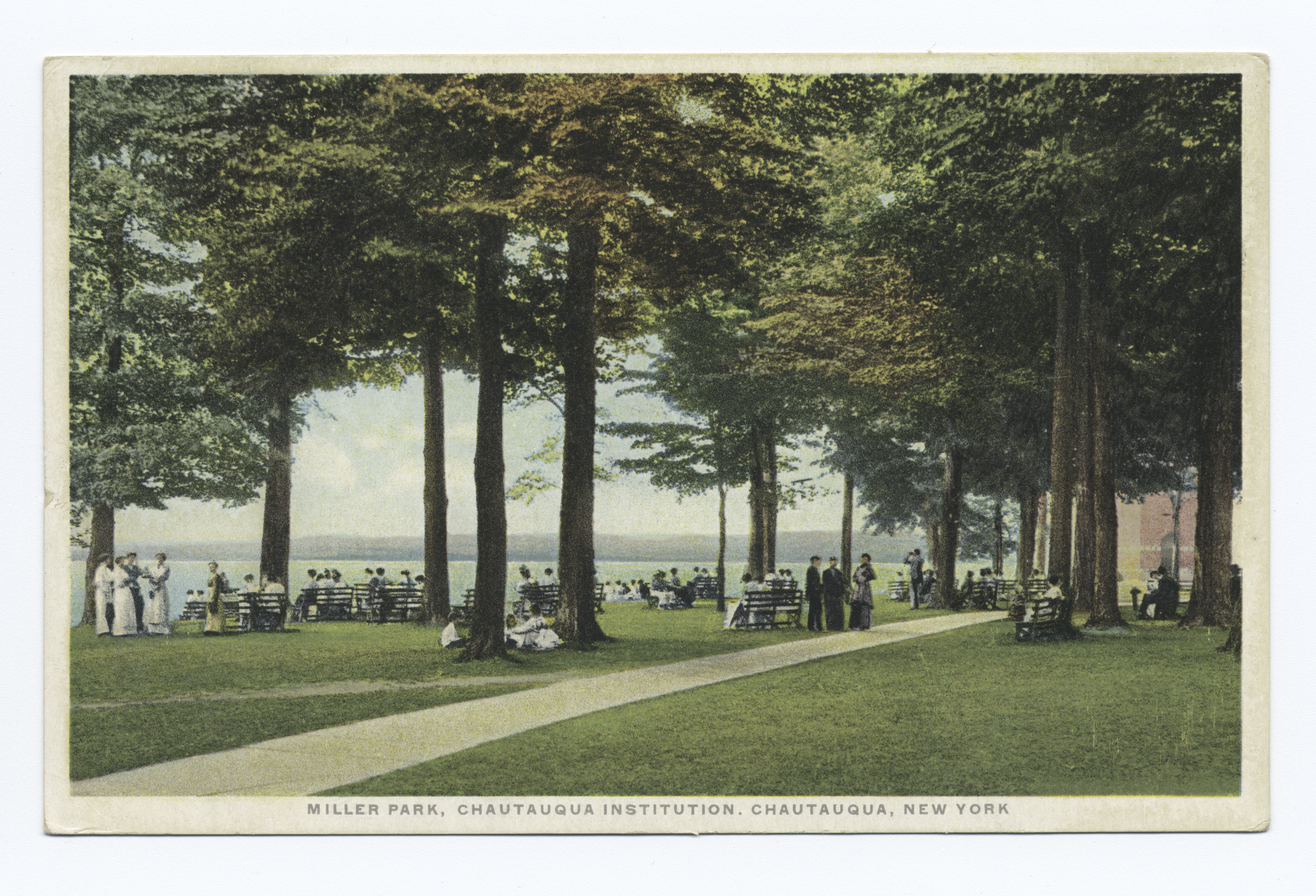
Miller Park, Chautauqua Lake

The idea of holding a national convention was formed during the "Chautauqua Lake Sunday School Assembly" in August 1874, at Miller Park, Chautauqua Lake, New York. There were 2,000–3,000 people in attendance at this assembly, including the wives of Methodist clergymen. While the women held a prayer meeting, Martha McClellan Brown came up with the idea of holding a temperance convention as she knelt in prayer next to Mrs. Russell, of Chicago, at Dr. John H. Vincent's camp-meeting. After bringing the idea before the prayer-meeting, prominent women, encouraged by men, moved forward in getting it before the women of the United States. Jennie Fowler Willing and Emily Huntington Miller were appointed to send out the invitations. Martha McClellan Brown, who became known as the "prime mover," and Mary Bigelow Ingham combined their efforts with those of Jennie Fowler Willing and Emily Huntington Miller. With temperance women from all over the U.S. embracing the idea, state conventions were held and delegates were appointed.

== Representative gathering ==
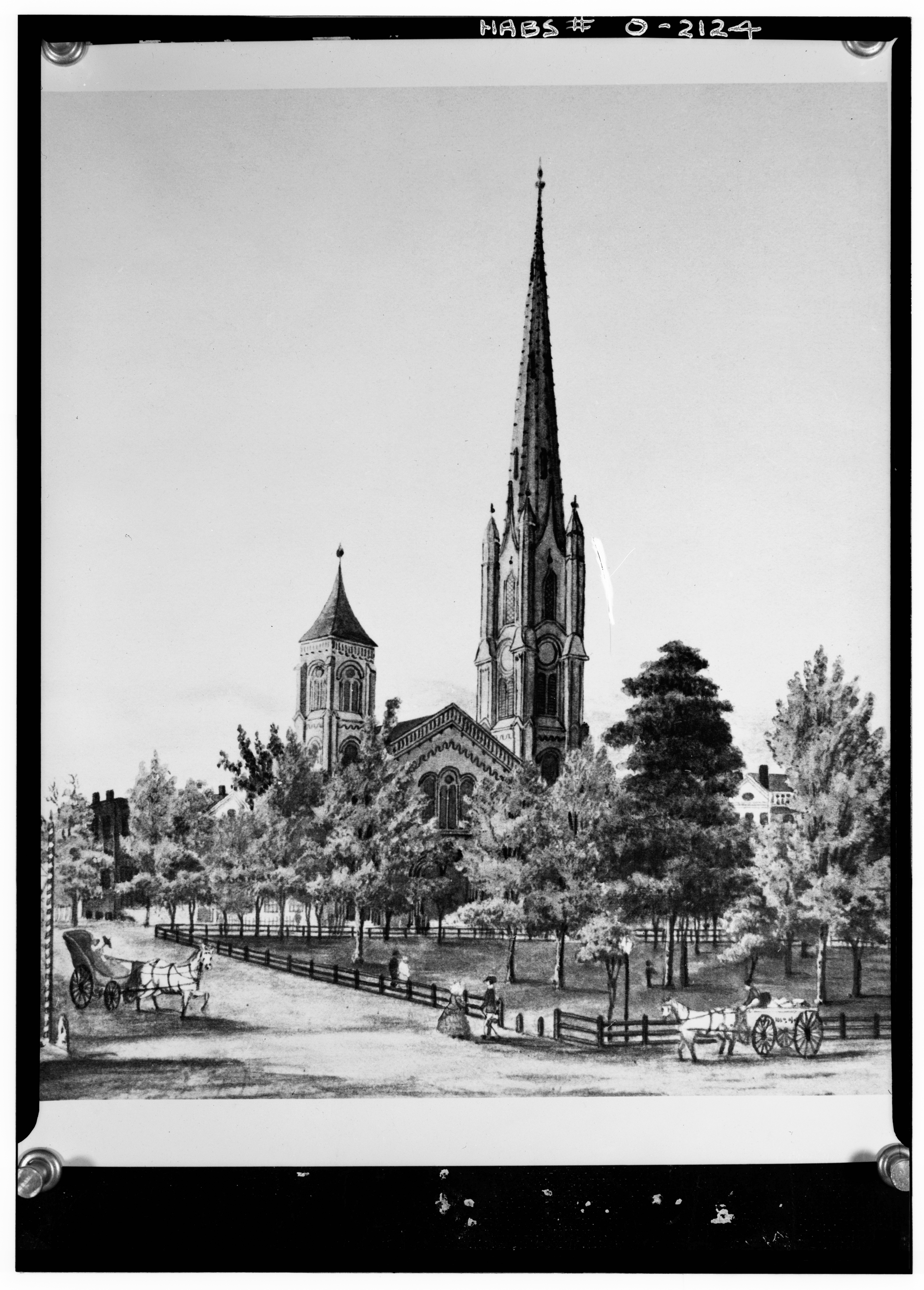
Old stone Presbyterian Church

The convention took place in the auditorium of Cleveland's Presbyterian church. This was a representative gathering, not only numerically and geographically, but in respect to character and to achievement. Judith Ellen Foster, a lawyer from Iowa, served as chief of the Committee on Constitution, to set the attendees right on legal points in general. Dr. Harriet Schneider French, a physician of Philadelphia, spoke about the relation of alcohol to medicine. There were three or four editors, a large quantity of teachers, two college professors, and Quaker ministers who wore dove-colored bonnets. Besides these, there were three licensed Methodist preachers, business women, and gray-haired matrons.

== Committees ==
=== Conference committee on temporary organization ===
The convention was called to order by Jennie Fowler Willing. The attendees were seated in delegations, according to their States and Congressional Districts, this being the most approved method by the attendees. They chose a committee on temporary organization, with one member from each State, which reported the following list of officers of the convention:

- President—Jennie Fowler Willing
- Vice-Presidents—Abby Fisher Leavitt; Zerelda G. Wallace; Mrs. J. Backus; Mrs. Matchett; Elizabeth Eunice Marcy; Susan A. Gifford; Susan J. Swift Steele; Mary Torrans Lathrap; Helen E. Brown; Emma A. Wheeler; Elizabeth Chamberlain Gibson; Lizzie Boyd
- Secretaries—Auretta Hoyt; Mary Towne Burt
- Treasurer—Mary Bigelow Ingham

These women were duly elected. Some discussion arose as to the rights of those who had not brought credentials, but a resolution, offered by Annie Turner Wittenmyer settled the question: "Retained, That the several State delegates be allowed to add to their number from representatives from each State, to the number of Congressional Districts in that State."

=== Others ===
After the committee on temporary organization was formed, the convention addressed itself to business and developed a list of committees indicating its general character:

- Committee on Credentials—Auretta Hoyt; Susan J. Swift Steele; Harriet Newell Kneeland Goff; Mary Bigelow Ingham; and Mrs. Joel Foster
- On Business—Almira Brackett; Mrs. E. R. Backus; Mrs. E. A. Bowers; Emma A. Wheeler; Mrs. A. M. Noe; Caroline H. Smoke Stryker; Mrs. H. M. Wilkin; Abbie Fisher Leavitt; Lizzie Boyd; Emma Janes; Mrs. J. A. Brown; Mary Torrans Lathrap; Fanny DuBois Chase
- On Circular Letter to Foreign Nations—Mary Torrans Lathrap; Fanny DuBois Chase; Emma Janes.
- On Resolutions—Eliza Daniel Stewart; Zerelda G. Wallace; Frances Willard; Mrs. Butler; Mrs. Collins; Mrs. Black; Martha McClellan Brown; Harriet Newell Kneeland Goff
- On Constitution—Judith Ellen Foster; Lydia M. Boise; Mrs. M. M. Finch; Annie Turner Wittenmyer; Mrs. Runyon; Lizzie Boyd; Susan A. Gifford; Mercy Ann Mann Kenyon; Mrs. J. A. Brown; Mrs. M. Davis; Mrs. J. Dickey
- On Finance—Abbie Fisher Leavitt; Caroline H. Smoke Stryker; Mrs. S. P. Robinson; Judith Ellen Foster; Mrs. M. Valentine
- On Memorial to Congress—Annie Turner Wittenmyer; Zerelda G. Wallace; Frances Willard
- On Constitution for National Temperance League—Mrs. M. M. Finch; Annie Turner Wittenmyer; Mrs. Runyon; Lydia M. Boise; Mrs. J. Dickey; Susan A. Gifford; Mrs. J. A. Brown; Mercy Ann Mann Kenyon; Judith Ellen Foster; Mrs. M. Davis; Lizzie Boyd
- On Address to the Young Women of America—Mary Torrans Lathrap, Chair
- On Letter to American Women—Elizabeth Eunice Smith Marcy; Mary Coffin Johnson; Abbie Fisher Leavitt
- On Juvenile Organizations—Eliza Thompson; Frances Willard; Mrs. A. M. Noe
- On Establishing a National Temperance Paper—Annie Turner Wittenmyer; Susan J. Swift Steele; Abbie Fisher Leavitt; Susan A. Gifford; Elizabeth Eunice Smith Marcy; Emma Janes; Mary Coffin Johnson

== Resolutions ==
Resolutions were adopted, embodying a sufficiently exhaustive "confession of faith": Whereas, Much of the evil by which this country is cursed comes from the fact that the men in power whose duty it is to make and administer the laws are either themselves intemperate men or controlled largely by the liquor power; therefore,

1. Resolved, That the women of the United States, in this convention represented, do hereby express their unqualified disapprobation of the custom so prevalent in political parties of placing intemperate men in office.
2. Resolved, That we will appeal to the House of Representatives, by petition, for their concurrence with the Senate bill providing a commission of inquiry into the effects and results of the liquor traffic in this country.
3. Resolved, That we respectfully ask the President of the United States, Senators, Representatives in Congress, Governors of States, and all public men, with their wives and daughters, to give the temperance cause the strength of their conspicuous example by banishing all wines and other intoxicating liquors from their banquets and their private tables.
4. Resolved, That we will endeavor to secure the co-operation of great manufacturing firms in our effort to pledge their employees to total abstinence, and that we will ask these firms to consider the advantages to sobriety of paying their men on Monday rather than on Saturday evening.
5. Resolved, That we respectfully request the physicians to exercise extreme and conscientious care in administering intoxicating liquors as a beverage.
6. Resolved, That as the National Temperance Society, and Publishing House in New York—J. N. Stearns, Publishing Agent—presents the best variety of temperance literature in the world, consisting of books, tracts, The National Temperance Advocate and The Youth't Temperance Banner, we hereby recommend the ladies of America to encourage the dissemination of this literature in connection with their work.
7. Resolved, That all temperance organizations of our land be invited to co-operate with us in our efforts for the overthrow of intemperance.
8. Resolved, That all good temperance women, without regard to sect or nationality, are cordially invited to unite with us in our great battle against the wrong and for the right.
9. Resolved, That in the conflict of moral ideas, we look to the pulpit and the press as our strongest earthly allies, and that we will, by our influence as Christian women and by our prayers, strive to increase the interest in our cause already manifested by their powerful instrumentalities, gratefully recognized by us.
10. Resolved, That we will pray and labor for a general revival of religion throughout our land, knowing that only through the action of the Holy Spirit on the hearts of the Church and the world will they be warmed to a vital interest in the temperance cause.
11. Resolved, That recognizing the fact that our cause is and will be combatted by mighty, determined, and relentless forces, we will, trusting in Him who is the Prince of Peace, meet argument with argument, misjudgment with patience, denunciation with kindness, and all our difficulties and dangers with prayer.

== Constitution and election of officers ==
A constitution was adopted and stated in part that this Association shall be known as the "Woman's National Christian Temperance Union." Thereafter, an election was held for the first officers of the WCTU. The newly elected officers were:

- President—Annie Turner Wittenmyer
- Vice-Presidents—Mary A. Gaines; Harriet Maria Haven; Susan A. Gifford; Mercy Ann Mann Kenyon; Fanny DuBois Chase; Eliza Thompson; Mrs. Rev. S. Reed; Elizabeth Eunice Smith Marcy; Susan J. Swift Steele; Zerelda G. Wallace; Mary Jane Aldrich; Caroline Batchelder Thompson
- Corresponding Secretary—Frances Willard
- Recording Secretary—Mary Coffin Johnson
- Treasurer—Mary Bigelow Ingham

== Mass meetings ==
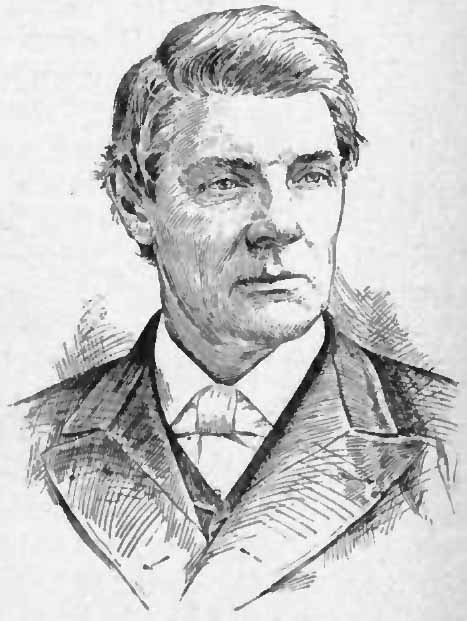
John Morgan Walden

Four mass-meetings were held during the convention. Dr. John Morgan Walden (Chief Knight of the new Crusade), presided at the first of these. It was an exceptional honor as no other man was allowed to speak throughout the whole convention. Abbie Fisher Leavitt conducted the second; Mrs. Dr. Donaldson, of Toledo, Ohio conducted the third; and Auretta Hoyt, carried on the fourth. Crowds filled these meetings, and Crusade hymns were interspersed with the music furnished by trained singers of Cleveland.

== Notable people ==
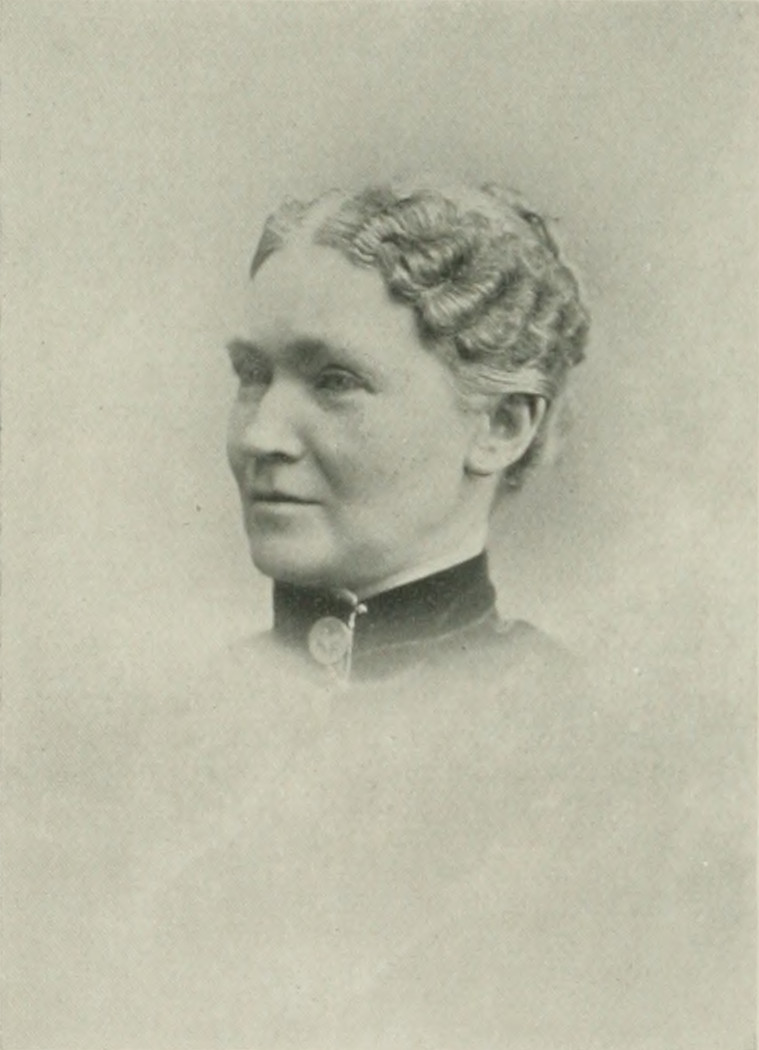
Emily Caroline Chandler Hodgin, Indiana

- Mary Jane Aldrich
- Mrs. J. Backus (Vermont)
- Mrs. E. R. Backus (Springfield, Vermont)
- Mrs. Black (Pennsylvania)
- Lydia Marie Kellogg Boise / Lydia Marie Kellogg Boies (1815, Worthington, MA - 1898, Grand Rapids, Michigan)
- Mrs. E. A. Bowers (Clinton, Massachusetts)
- Lizzie Boyd (Wheeling, West Virginia)
- Almira Brackett (Biddeford, Maine)
- Helen E. Brown (New York state)
- Mrs. J. A. Brown (Milwaukee, Wisconsin)
- Martha McClellan Brown
- Mary Towne Burt
- Mrs. Butler (New York)
- Fanny DuBois Chase
- Mrs. Collins (Pennsylvania)
- Mrs. M. Davis (Vermont)
- Mrs. J. Dickey (Illinois)
- Mrs. Dr. Donaldson (Toledo, Ohio)
- Mrs. M. M. Finch (Indiana)
- Mrs. Joel Foster (Montpelier, Vermont)
- Judith Ellen Foster
- Harriet Schneider French
- Mary A. Gaines (Saco, Maine)
- Elizabeth Chamberlain Gibson
- Susan A. Gifford (Worcester, Massachusetts)
- Harriet Newell Kneeland Goff
- Harriet Maria Haven (Mrs. Joel Mills Haven; Rutland, Vermont)
- Emily Caroline Chandler Hodgin (Indiana)
- Auretta Hoyt (Indianapolis, Indiana)
- Mary Bigelow Ingham
- Emma Janes (Oakland, California)
- Mary Coffin Johnson
- Mercy Ann Mann Kenyon (Mrs. Dr. Lorenzo Marcellus Kenyon of New York)
- Mary Torrans Lathrap
- Abby Fisher Leavitt
- Elizabeth Eunice Marcy
- Mrs. Matchett (Pennsylvania)
- Emily Huntington Miller
- Mrs. A. M. Noe (Indianapolis, Indiana)
- Mrs. Rev. S. Reed (Ann Arbor, Michigan)
- Mrs. S. P. Robinson (Pennsylvania)
- Mrs. Runyon (Ohio)
- Mrs. Russell (Chicago, Illinois)
- Susan J. Swift Steele
- Eliza Daniel Stewart
- Caroline H. Smoke Stryker (Mrs. Peter Stryker; Rome, New York)
- Caroline Batchelder Thompson (Mrs. Robert Thompson; San Francisco, California)
- Eliza Thompson
- Mrs. M. Valentine (Indiana)
- John H. Vincent
- John Morgan Walden
- Zerelda G. Wallace
- Emma A. Wheeler (Cedar Rapids, Iowa)
- Mrs. H. M. Wilkin (Paris, Illinois)
- Frances Willard
- Jennie Fowler Willing
- Annie Turner Wittenmyer

== See also ==
- Second Annual Meeting of the National Woman's Christian Temperance Union
- Third Annual Meeting of the National Woman's Christian Temperance Union
