= Third Annual Meeting of the National Woman's Christian Temperance Union =

- Status: Active
- Genre: Conference
- Date: October 25–28, 1876
- Frequency: Annually
- Venue: Central Methodist church
- Locations: Newark, New Jersey, U.S.
- Most recent: 150th Annual N.W.C.T.U. Convention, Reno, Nevada, August 2023
- Previous event: Second Annual Meeting of the N.W.C.T.U., Cincinnati, Ohio, November 1875
- Next event: 1877, Chicago, Illinois
- Area: United States
- Major events: Temperance movement in the United States
- Leader: President, Annie Turner Wittenmyer

The Third Annual Meeting of the National Woman's Christian Temperance Union (N.W.C.T.U.) was held in Newark, New Jersey, October 25–28, 1876. Twenty-two State unions were represented at this meeting, and local unions were reported as having been formed for the first time in Tennessee, Louisiana, and Arkansas, preparatory to State organizations. No officer of the N.W.C.T.U. received a dollar for services or traveling expenses during the year. Robert's Rules of Order was adopted as the parliamentary authority for the N.W.C.T.U.

== Background ==
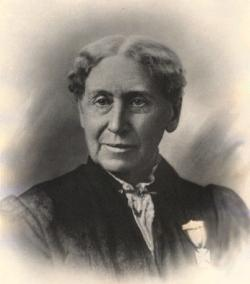
Annie Turner Wittenmyer, President

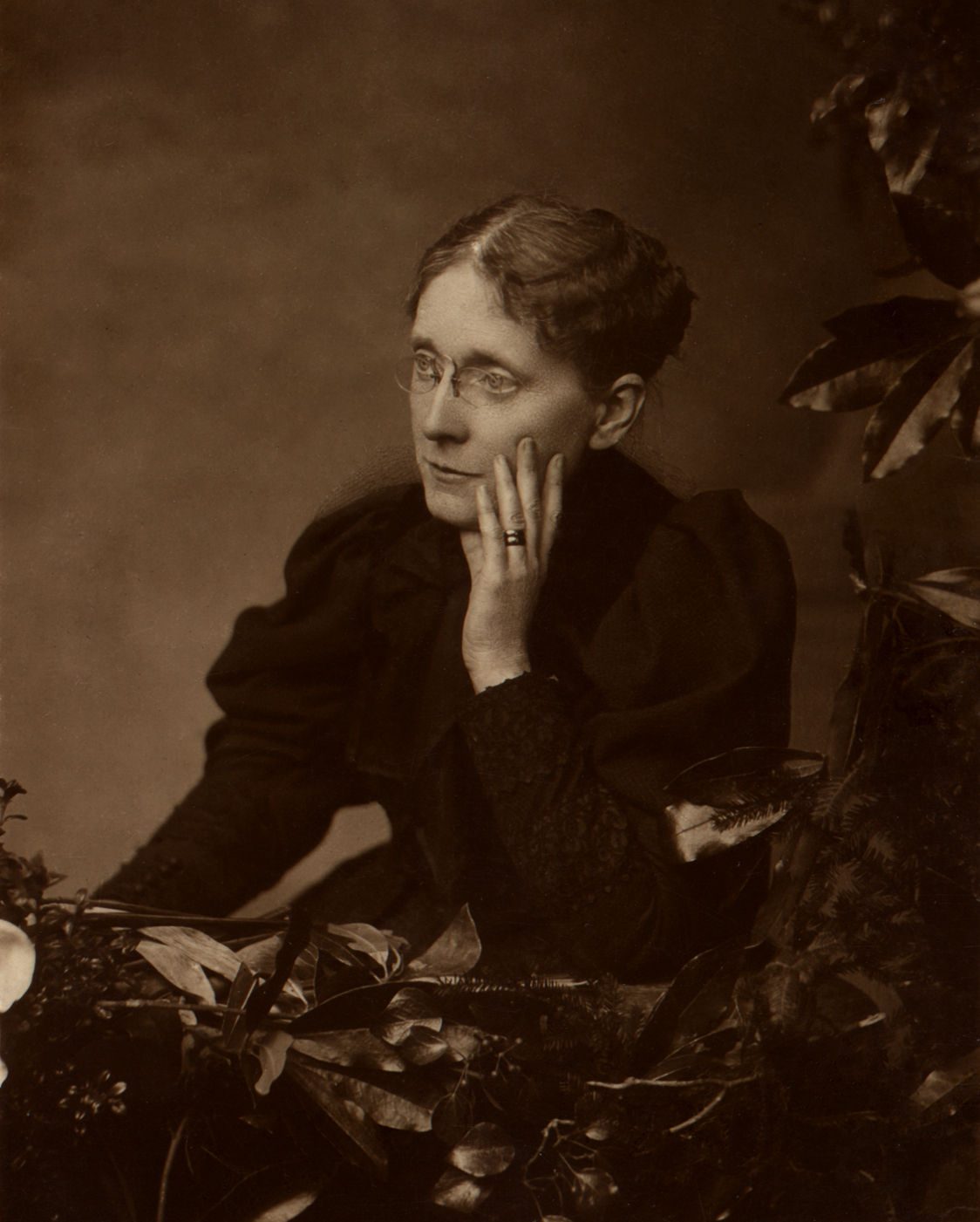
Frances Willard, Corresponding secretary

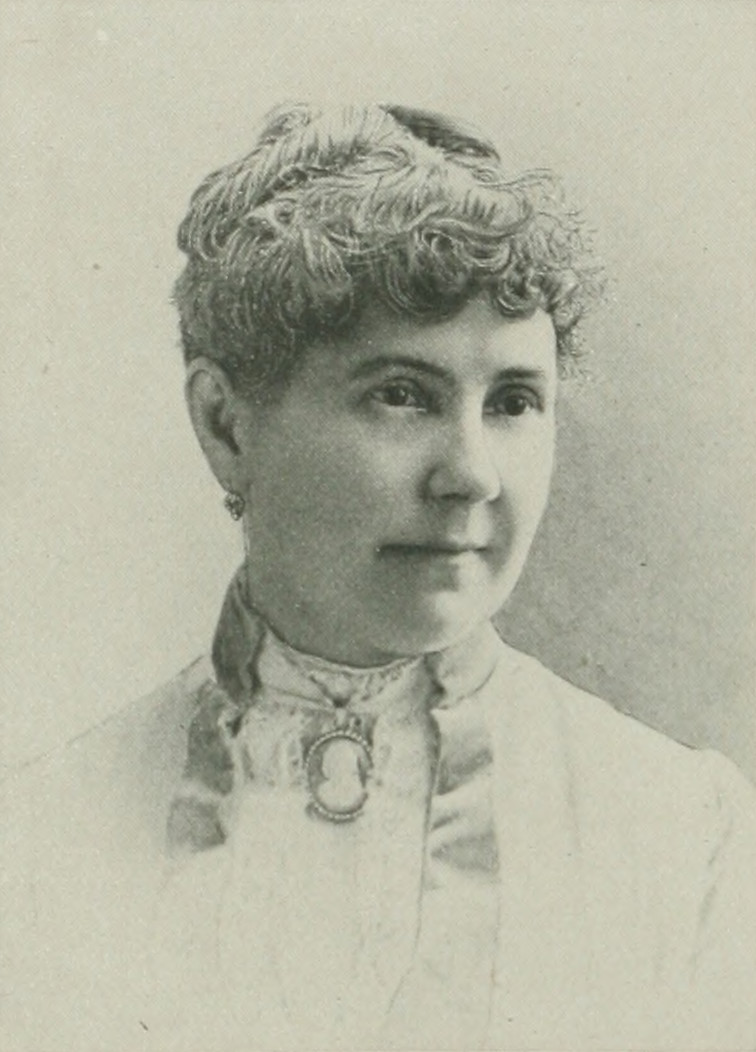
Sarah Knowles Bolton, Assistant corresponding secretary

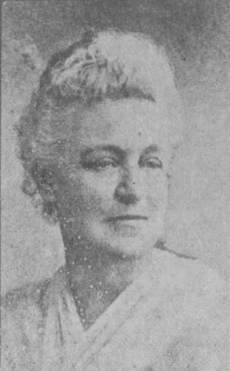
Mary Coffin Johnson, Recording secretary

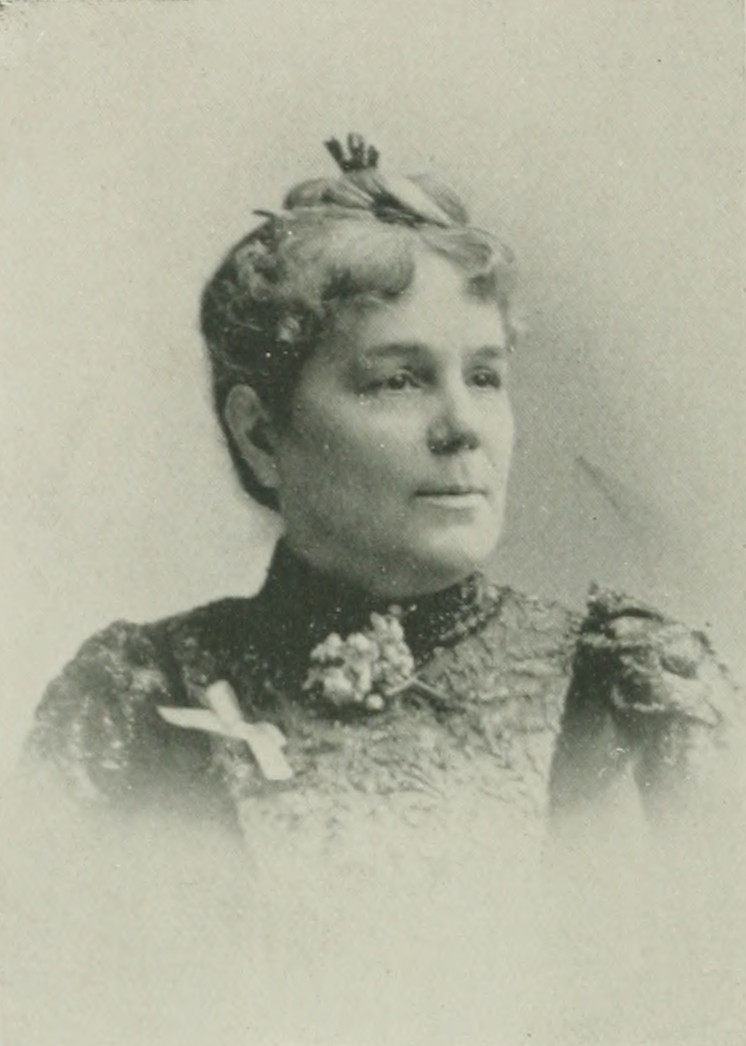
Mary Towne Burt, Assistant recording secretary

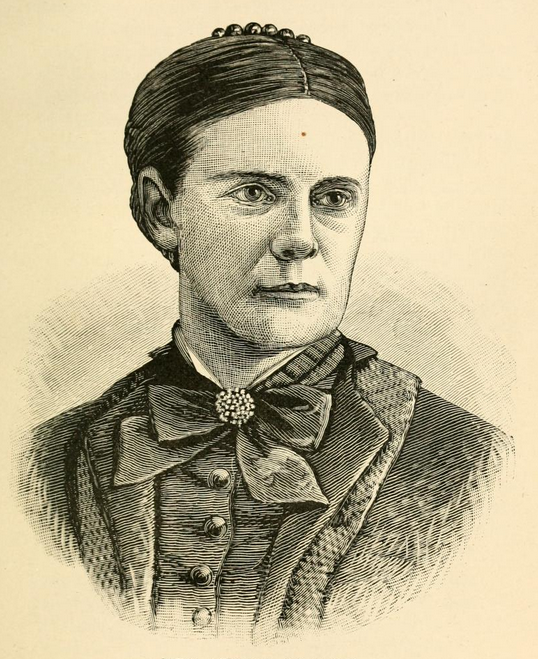
Abby Fisher Leavitt, Treasurer

The convention of the U.S. National Centennial year was held in Newark, New Jersey, in the Central Methodist church, October 25–28. On the first morning, a Bible Reading was conducted by Hannah Whitall Smith, whose name thus appears for the first time, in connection with the W.C.T.U. The addresses of welcome were given by "Mother Hill" of Newark, and Mary R. Denman, New Jersey state president, while the response was voiced by Mary Torrans Lathrap of Michigan. Robert's Rules of Order was adopted as the parliamentary authority for the N.W.C.T.U.

Disregarding the earnest pleading of her friends, Frances Willard repeated her "women's suffrage speech" at the packed church. Though she was applauded after finishing her speech, the conference chair, Annie Turner Wittenmyer came forward saying, "I wish it clearly understood that the speaker represents herself and not the Woman's Christian Temperance Union, for we do not propose to trail our skirts through the mire of politics."

It was at this Newark convention that the N.W.C.T.U. motto, "For God and Home and Native Land," was first endorsed. It had come to Frances Willar's thought early in the work and been accepted as the motto of the Chicago W.C.T.U., then of the State of Illinois, and lastly, of the nation. It was at the Newark convention that a majority of the members pledged themselves to pass the cup untasted at the sacramental table, if they knew that it held alcoholic wine.

At the Newark convention, the N.W.C.T.U. organ was found to be so heavily in debt that its committee of publication resigned, and Jane M. Geddes, of Michigan, Mary Towne Burt, of New York, Caroline Brown Buell, of Connecticut, and Frances Willard volunteered to save the day for this new journalistic venture and literary outgrowth of the Women's Crusade by putting in what money they had as a free-will offering, gathering up gifts from their friends, and agreeing to give several months' gratuitous work to the paper.

== Reports ==
The corresponding secretary gave reports from 26 states, not all of which were regularly organized. The treasurer reported receipts from 22 states and a total of US$657.85 during the year, with a balance of US$213.63 in the treasury. The report of the corresponding secretary was given by states, and showed marked progress. The following paragraphs sum up of the whole:

"Through the efforts of our committee appointed for that purpose, an International Temperance Convention of Women was held in the Academy of Music, Philadelphia (June 7 to 9 inclusive), which was attended by delegates from nearly all of the states, also from Canada, Great Britain and Japan, and from which resulted an International Woman's Temperance Union, the purpose of which is to bind the hearts and hands of women in all lands in earnest efforts for the overthrow of home's worst enemy.
Under the auspices of the National Temperance Society (Hon. William E. Dodge , president), an International Convention of temperance men and women immediately succeeded ours, in the same city, our delegates being welcomed to participate in all its deliberations, and several of their number furnishing essays, by special invitation."

Frances Willard also recorded the setting apart of special days for the W.C.T.U. at the large summer gatherings, Old Orchard Beach, Lake Bluff, Chautauqua, Thousand Island Park, and others. The fact that Annie Turner Wittenmyer and Mary Denman had made a trip to Kentucky, Tennessee, and Louisiana in the interests of the organization, and that Mary Coffin Johnson and Mother Stewart had visited Great Britain under the auspices of the International Organisation of Good Templars, was chronicled. Willard also said:

"Our Union has circulated the petition to Congress for a Commission of Inquiry into the cost and results of the liquor traffic in America. The desired Commission of Inquiry has been ordered by the Senate, in response to the wish of the united temperance societies of the land, but the subject did not come before the House at the last session."

Certain practical recommendations were given by the secretary. They were: 1. Industrial and evening schools. 2. Work for young women in schools and colleges. 3. A unification of the juvenile work. 4. Union church temperance prayer meetings once a quarter to be secured through the influence of local unions. 5. The circulation of a petition for Home Protection, asking that the ballot on the license question be given to women, also that liquor dealers be required to obtain the signatures of the majority of voters and of women over eighteen years of age before opening shops for the sale of intoxicating drinks.

The report was accepted, copies were ordered to be published at once for distribution among the delegates, and the recommendations were referred to the Business Committee. Important reports were presented by the Committee on Medical Commission (Wittenmyer, chair), by the standing committee on Young Ladies' Leagues (Willard, chair), by the Lyceum Bureau (Sarah A. McClees, chair), by the Committee on Juvenile Work (Mrs. Dr. Crane, chair), by the Standing Committee on Bible Wines (Wittenmyer, chair), and by Hannah Whitall Smith, chair of the Committee on Resolutions. The first and second resolutions were as follows:

Resolved, That by prayer, persuasion and petition, we will seek to influence those strongholds of power, the National Congress, state legislatures, and municipal authorities whence the rum-shop derives its safeguards and its guarantees, and
Resolved, That to this end we will combine our efforts to secure such legislation as shall require the liquor dealers in every state, except in such states as have a prohibition law in actual force, to obtain the signatures of a majority of the women over twenty-one years of age, as well as that of the voters of any locality, before opening a place for the sale of intoxicating drinks.

This resolution was adopted and a committee appointed to prepare the Home Protection Petition, Caroline Brown Buell, chair.

== Notable people ==
The officers elected were the same as the preceding year, (President, Annie Turner Wittenmyer; corresponding secretary, Frances Willard; recording secretary, Mary Coffin Johnson; assistant recording secretary, Mary Towne Burt; treasurer, Abby Fisher Leavitt) with the addition of Sarah Knowles Bolton, who, at Willard's request, was made assistant corresponding secretary.

At this convention, the name of Lillian M. N. Stevens of Maine was first recorded. She was made chair of the Press Committee. Rhoda A. Esmond represented New York at this national convention and those in 1887 and 1888.

== See also ==
- First Woman's National Temperance Convention (1874)
- Second Annual Meeting of the National Woman's Christian Temperance Union (1876)
