= Henry Ryan =

Henry Ryan may refer to:

- Henry Ryan (minister) (1775–1794), US-Canadian Methodist minister
- Henry Ryan (politician) (1873–1943), member of the Queensland Legislative Assembly

== See also ==
- Harry Ryan (disambiguation)
