= Harriet Schneider French =

American physician and temperance movement activist

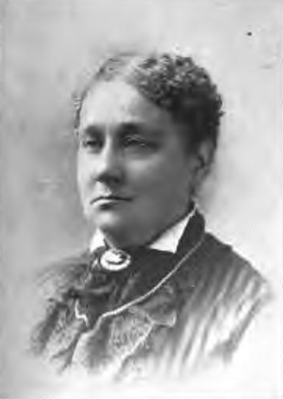

Harriet Schneider French (1824 – September 5, 1906) was an American physician and temperance movement activist. She was one of Philadelphia's pioneering women in the medical profession, and one of the earliest women in the United States to obtain a diploma as a physician. When she died in 1906, she was the oldest woman physician in the country.

== Early life and education ==
French was born in Philadelphia in 1824. She was a member of the Schneider family, a representative of whom was for several generations grand tyler at the Masonic Temple in Philadelphia, and well known to Allentown Masons.

She received her early education in the public schools of her city.

Sources vary regarding her medical school education. French's obituary in The Allentown Leader states that she was the second woman to receive the degree of M.D. from Hahnemann College. Kirschmann (2004) offers a footnotes that French may have attended Hahnemann College (now known as Drexel University College of Medicine. Drexel University College of Medicine records indicate that French received her medical degree in 1864 but doesn't name the institution, only that it was in Pennsylvania. However, The Woman's Medical Journal (1907) states that French received her Medical Degree (M.D.) from Penn Medical University.

== Career ==
French began her career as a public school teacher.

After completing medical school, she first practiced Allopathic medicine, but changed to Homeopathy.

French spoke about the relation of alcohol to medicine during the First Woman's National Temperance Convention. She served as president of the Women's Homeopathic Society of Pittsburgh, and for 50 years of the Philadelphia County branch of the Woman's Christian Temperance Union (WCTU). In 1871, she was admitted into the American Institute of Homeopathy. In addition to her work against alcohol consumption, French called on the WCTU to fight the cigarette habit.

Around 1900, while crossing a street in the vicinity of her home, she was knocked down by a bicycle and severely injured. A year later, heart trouble had aggravated her physical condition. French died at her home in Philadelphia, from cerebral hemorrhage, September 5, 1906, aged 83.
