= Martha McClellan Brown =

American lecturer, reformer and editor (1838-1916)

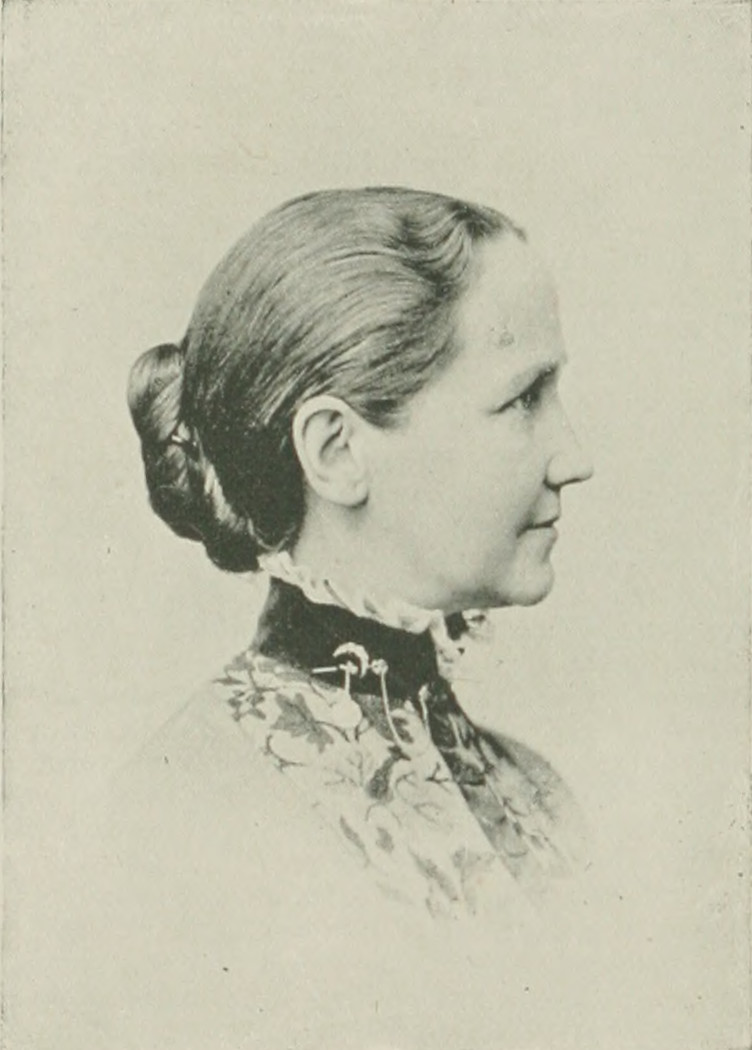
Photo portrait from A Woman of the Century

Martha McClellan Brown (April 16, 1838 – August 31, 1916) was an American lecturer, educator, reformer, newspaper editor, and major leader in the temperance movement in Ohio.

In 1861, Brown joined the fraternal organization Independent Order of Good Templars, beginning her temperance career. The organization promoted total abstinence and state prohibition. In 1868, she was editor of a local newspaper in Alliance, Ohio, The Alliance Monitor, where she and her husband turned it into a temperance publication during their tenure until 1878. She served as Grand Templar of Ohio from 1872 to 1873. Brown helped form the Women's Temperance Association of Ohio in 1874 by drafting a plan and called for the First Woman's National Temperance Convention in November 1874 after realizing new supporters of the temperance movement were unwilling to join the Good Templars. At the convention, the Woman's Christian Temperance Union (WCTU) was founded. She wanted to be president of the new organization, but the post went to Annie Turner Wittenmyer because of Brown's ties to the Good Templars. In 1876, Brown was named vice president of the Prohibition Party and advocated for women's suffrage as part of the platform. She moved to New York City in 1877, leaving her family in Pittsburgh and spending her time as secretary of the National Prohibition Alliance. Brown broke with the party in 1896 when the party dropped its commitment to suffrage.

Brown served as vice-president of the Cincinnati Wesleyan Women's College from 1882 to 1892. In Cincinnati, she became prominent in civic affairs, including organizing school mothers’ clubs; launching a summer program from the city's poor children; and president of the Woman's Rotary Club in 1914. She was a contributor of current articles to dallies and monthlies.

== Early life and education ==
Martha ("Mattie") McClellan was born in Baltimore, Maryland, on April 16, 1838. Her parents were David and Jane Manypenny McClellan. On the father's side she is descended from the McClellans, Covenanters of Scotland, and on the mother's side from the old Maryland families of Manypenny and Hight. In 1840, the family relocated to Cambridge, Ohio. She was orphaned at eight years old. Martha and an only older sister were admitted to full family privileges in the home of neighbors, Thomas and Nancy Cummings Cranston, the husband a Protestant Irishman, and the wife of the old Quaker Cummings family, of Philadelphia, Pennsylvania.

In the fall of 1860, she was a pupil in the Pittsburgh Female College, and in 1862, was graduated at the head of her class.

== Career ==
At the age of 20, Martha made the acquaintance of Reverend W. Kennedy Brown, of the Pittsburgh Methodist Episcopal Conference, and on November 15, 1858, they were married. The young people were imbued with a strong purpose of educating and projecting woman personally along religious lines.

=== 1860s ===
In 1864, Brown appeared in a public lecture in support of the American Civil War in the courthouse hall of the strong Democratic county of Westmoreland County, Pennsylvania, where her husband was pastor. That movement was followed by public lectures in Philadelphia, Pittsburgh and many smaller places. In 1866, Brown, owing to the unexpected death of the principal of the public schools in the county-seat of Columbiana County, Ohio, where her husband had been appointed pastor, was engaged as associate principal with her husband. She was elected superintendent of the Sunday school, although the Methodist Church had not at that time arranged its law to admit women to such responsibility. She delivered temperance and literary lectures. In 1867, she was elected to a place in the executive committee of Ohio Good Templary, and immediately founded the temperance lecture system. That position she held from 1867, through the organization of the Prohibition party in 1869, the Ohio Woman's Crusade in 1873, and the founding of the National WCTU in 1874, in each of which movements she was a leader. In 1868, she took editorial charge of the Republican newspaper of Alliance, Ohio.

At that time, the Republican party was known to weaken before the demands of the German Brewers' Beer Congress, and Brown openly denounced the demands of the brewers as "un-American." She also sharply criticised the efforts of what she recognized as the rum oligarchy at political domination, and she reprimanded the truculent spirit and conduct of many politicians. Julius A. Spencer, of Cleveland, secretary of Ohio Good Templary in 1868, proposed to Brown the formation of an independent political party, and she extended her hand to assist him. The question being further discussed, Brown's husband required that, before his wife should unite in the movement for a new party, there must be an agreement to place woman on an equal status with man. Spencer finally agreed that woman should have equal status in the new party, and that a plank asserting this fact should be inserted in the platform, provided they were not expected to discuss that issue before the people. The Prohibition party was organized in Ohio early in the following year, 1860. The name of the party was suggested by Brown's husband as more appropriate than "Anti-Dram-Shop," the name proposed by another friend of the cause. Brown was present in Oswego, New York, in May, 1869, at the first caucus for a national organization of the new temperance party.

=== 1870s ===
In 1870, Mr. Brown purchased the political newspaper, of which his wife was editor, and for years that paper was made the vehicle of vigorous warfare against the liquor traffic. As a member of the executive committee of Good Templars in Ohio, she had almost constant opportunity, apart from her position as editor of a local city paper, for the circulation of her views. Her family had increased until the number of the children was four, two sons and two daughters. Elizabeth Cady Stanton desired to enlist Brown in her efforts for the suffrage reform, but both Mr. and Mrs. Brown refused; and they steadily avoided, from policy, the discussion of the question or any identification with the woman suffrage workers. In 1872, Mrs. Brown was elected a delegate of Good Templars to Great Britain. Very shortly thereafter, she was called to the headship of the order in the State of Ohio. When she appeared upon the platform in Scotland and England in 1873, audiences of from 5,000 to 10,000 greeted the American temperance woman, and her title of Grand Chief Templar of Ohio was a passport to recognitions of royalty, even so far remote as Milan, Italy.

Returning from the European tour, her services were in constant demand. She was elected at the State Grand Lodge of Ohio, held in Columbus in 1873, to succeed herself in the office she held. When Brown heard of the work of the new revival, she hastened to examine and determine its spirit. Believing that it was a visitation from the Lord in answer to years of work and much prayer, she in her capacity of Chief Templar issued an order in January, 1874, for a day of fasting and prayer in the 300 lodges of Ohio under her jurisdiction, and encouraged that all ministers of religion favorable to the order and the cause of temperance be invited to unite with the Good Templars in a day of humiliation and worship for enlightenment and power for a dispensation of a much-needed temperance revival.

During the year of the Women's Crusade of 1873–74, she received 3,000 letters. Finding that the women who had become active in the out door work of the crusade were not satisfied to enter the Good Templar lodges, Brown, at the suggestion of her husband, prepared a plan for the organization of crusaders in a national society without passwords or symbols, under which plan open religious temperance meetings and work should be pursued, women being the chief instruments of such work. It was her purpose to project this effort of organization at a proposed visit to the first meeting of the Chautauqua Assembly, which was carried out August 12, 1874. in 1874, during which Jane Fowler Willing, a staff member at Wesleyan university, Emily Huntington Miller, who worked in Northwestern university, and McClellan Brown met together at Fairpoint, New York for a national Sunday school assembly. They believed that they could cure society's ills better than men could, and decided to combat liquor trafficking to prove that they could do it better than men.

She afterwards was chiefly instrumental in gathering the women in the first national convention in Cleveland, Ohio, where she largely assisted in developing her plan, which was made the basis of the permanent organization of the National WCTU.

Just after the founding of the WCTU in August, 1874, Brown was elected Right Grand Vice-Templar of the International Order of Good Templars, in Boston, Massachusetts. That gave her a place in a board of five, which held supervision over upwards of 800,000 pledged temperance workers. When nominated for the president of their union by the women in Cleveland. Ohio, the ladies were sarcastically reminded that Brown was an active official of the Prohibition Party, Chief Templar of Ohio, and a member of the International Executive of Good Templary, and ought not to be made president of the Woman's Union. She immediately arose and withdrew her name, and Wittenmyer was elected to the place.

In 1876, Brown objected to the attitude of the majority of the Right Grand Lodge of Good Templars in rejecting lodges of African Americans, and so withdrew and united with the English delegates in constituting a more liberal body. After ten years of separation, the two bodies adjusted their issue by providing for regular lodges of African Americans, and Brown marched at the head of the English delegation on entering the hall for the re-union of the bodies of Good Templars, in 1886, in Saratoga Springs, New York.

In 1877, after repeated personal efforts with leading Republican officials, State and National, had failed to secure any actual, or even fairly promised political, antagonisms of the liquor interests, Brown went to New York City and assumed the management of the newly organized National Prohibition Alliance. She had also a secondary aim, which was to make that organization a barrier and corrective against the growing defection of temperance workers from radical measures of reform. Hence, she gave herself for five years to the projection of prohibition reform by means of the National Prohibition Alliance, which she caused to be operated chiefly in the churches and independent of party policy. Through those years, she maintained an office in New York City without salary, while her husband continued in the ministry and, with their family of five children, remained at his work in Pittsburgh.

=== 1880s and beyond ===
In the winter of 1881–82, from a caucus of Republicans, directed by Simon Cameron, she received the tender of the highly remunerative position of Superintendent of Public Instruction in the State of Pennsylvania. To have accepted that offer, she would have been compelled to abandon her work with the Prohibition Alliance, without any one to take her place; hence she did not accept.

In October, 1881, Brown gathered through personal letters, special circulars, and press notices a large National Conference of leading Prohibitionists and reformers in the Central Methodist Episcopal Church, New York City. Before that Conference, she made one of her most impassioned appeals for unity among temperance workers, whereby the National Prohibition Alliance was led to unite formally with the Prohibition Reform Party. The success of the New York conference led to a similar conference in Chicago the following year, August, 1882, which was arranged for by Brown, and which was more successful than the one held in New York. Many of the old leaders of the Prohibition Reform Party were induced to attend the Chicago conference. At that conference, Frances E. Willard and her immediate following of Home Protectionists and the WCTU were brought into the Prohibition Party, besides many local organizations of temperance workers. Brown thereupon dropped the non-partisan National Prohibition Alliance, believing that it had served its purpose.

In the summer of 1882, Dr. and Mrs. Brown were elected to the presidency and vice-presidency of the Cincinnati Wesleyan College. The entire management of the institution thereafter devolved upon them, with Brown holding a professorship as well as the vice-presidency of the college, having previously received the degrees of Ph.D. and LL.D. During that time, she twice visited Europe and was warmly received among reformers and scholars abroad. In Cincinnati, she became prominent in civic affairs, including organizing school mothers’ clubs; launching a summer program from the city's poor children; establishing the Fresh Air Movement; and serving as president of the Woman's Rotary Club in 1914. In 1886, her son Orvan Graff Brown founded the Twin Valley College in Germantown, Ohio. Mr. And Mrs. Brown were on the school's board of directors for the remainder of their lives. In 1894, at Mrs. Brown's suggestion, the school was converted into the Miami Military Institute.

== Personal life ==
In 1858, she married Reverend W. Kennedy Brown. Together, they had six children: Orvon Graff (1863), Westanna O’Neil, Charme, Richard McClellan, Marie, and Kleon Thaw (1886).

After four days of illness, Brown died on August 31, 1916, in Dayton, Ohio of ptomaine poisoning, after being ill for four days. Her papers are held in a collection by Wright State University.
