= Jennie Fowler Willing =

Canadian-American educator & author (1834–1916)

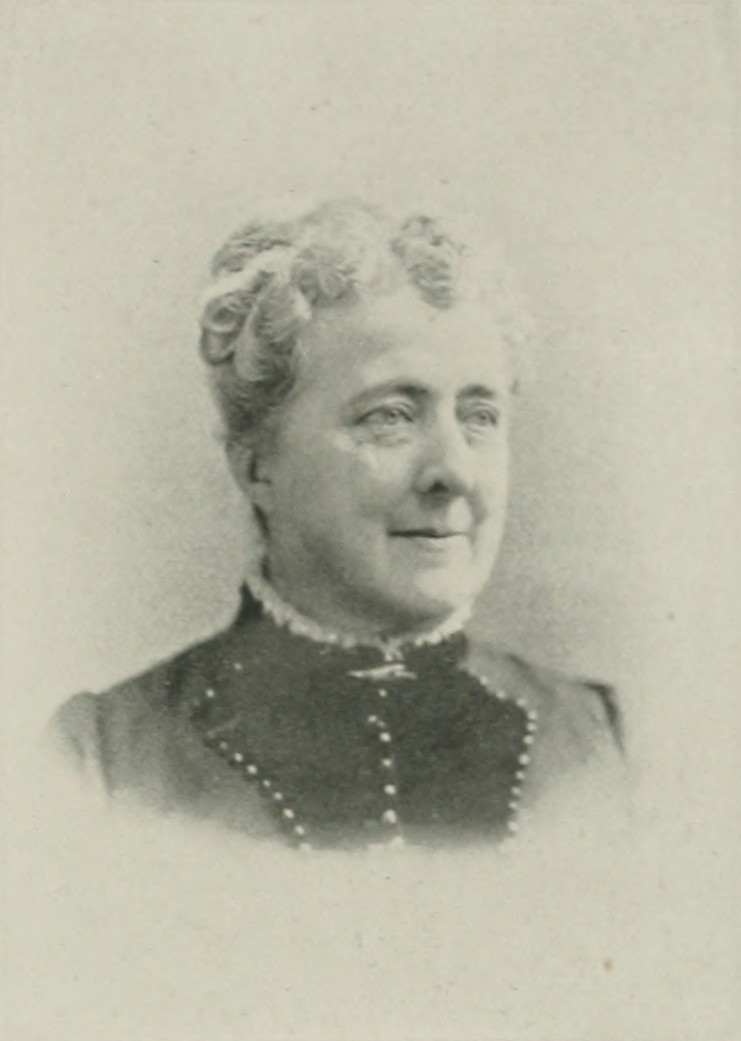
- from a book titled "A woman of the century"
- Born: January 22, 1834; Burford, Upper Canada
- Died: October 6, 1916 (aged 82); New York City, New York, U.S.
- Education: Evanston College for Ladies
- Occupations: educator, author, preacher, social reformer
- Spouse: William Crossgrove Willing (m. 1853)
- Relatives: Charles Henry Fowler (brother), Henry Ryan (grandfather)
- Writing career
- Language: English
- Notable work: From Fifteen to Twenty-five: A Book for Young Men

Jennie Fowler Willing (January 22, 1834 – October 6, 1916) was a Canadian-born American educator, author, preacher, social reformer, and suffragist. She married a lawyer and Methodist pastor at age 19. In 1873, she and her husband became professors at Illinois Wesleyan University. In addition to teaching, she was a leader in the temperance movement. Willing came to notice when she joined the Illinois Woman's State Temperance Union, serving as its leader for some years. She and Emily Huntington Miller were involved with creating and presiding over the First Woman's National Temperance Convention of 1874 in Cleveland where the National Woman's Christian Temperance Union was formed. She served as the editor of the national organization's journal for a period. In 1895, she created the New York Evangelistic Training School. Willing wrote several books including From Fifteen to Twenty-five: A Book for Young Men and serials for newspapers.

== Early life and education ==
Jennie Fowler was born in 1834 in Burford, Upper Canada. Her parents, Horatio and Harriet (Ryan) Fowler, were of English, Scotch and Irish descent. Her maternal grandmother was disinherited because she chose to share the wilderness perils with an itinerant minister, Henry Ryan. Her father was a Canadian "patriot," who lost all in an attempt to secure national independence. He was glad to escape to the States with his life and his family, and to begin life again in the new West. He could give his children little more than a hatred of tyranny, constant industry, careful economy and good morals.

Willing fell into a well at the age of two, and had long-term health problems. In 1842, the family removed to Newark, Illinois. Here, her brother Charles Henry Fowler, was engaged for a period to Frances Willard.

She received the honorary university degree of A.M. degree (Evanston College for Ladies, 1872 or 1873).

== Career ==
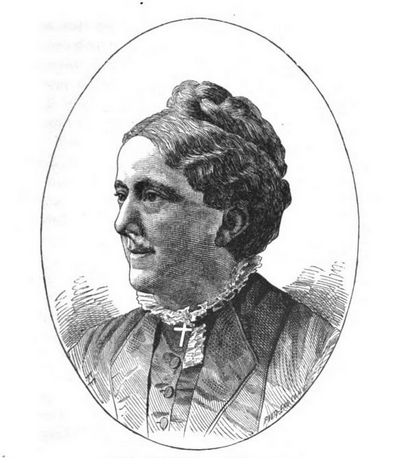
Jennie Fowler Willing

=== Educator, writer ===
She began teaching school when she was 15 years old. The next year, she finished teaching the winter term of a village school, from which the "big boys" had "turned out" their young man teacher.

In 1853, at the age of 19, she married William Crossgrove Willing, a Methodist Episcopal Church minister, and went with him to western New York. The many duties of a pastor's wife left small time for study, but she continued to study language and a science. She began to write for the press at the age of 16, and, besides constant contributions to papers and magazines, she produced two serials for New York papers and 10 books. In 1873, she was elected professor of English language and literature in the Illinois Wesleyan University. After that, she was connected as trustee or teacher with several literary institutions. In 1874, she was nominated, with a fair prospect of election, to the superintendency of public instruction in the State of Illinois. On account of other duties, she was obliged to decline the nomination.

=== Social reformer ===
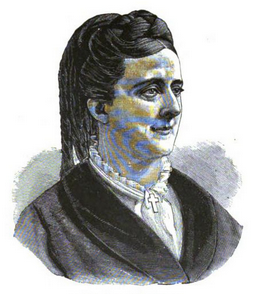
Jennie Fowler Willing

Her inherited love of reform brought her to the fore when the crusade swept over the United States. For several years, she was president of the Illinois Woman's State Temperance Union. With Miller, she issued the call for the Cleveland convention, and she presided over that body, in which the National Woman's Christian Temperance Union (NWCTU) was organized. She was the first editor of the NWCTU's organ, later titled The Union Signal. Willing was drawn into public speaking by her temperance zeal, and soon she found herself addressing immense audiences in all the large cities of the U.S.. As one of the corresponding secretaries of the Woman's Foreign Missionary Society, she presented the temperance claims at conferences of ministers, and in scores of large towns in different parts of the U.S., interesting thousands of people in its work. Her other roles included superintendent of the NWCTU's Evangelistic Training Department, and president of the Frances Willard WCTU.

For several years, she rendered similar service to the Woman's Home Missionary Society. As an evangelist, she held many large and important revival services, and with marked success. After her removal to New York City, in 1889, she was busy with her home mission work, her evangelistic services, her Italian mission and the bureau for immigrants, with its immigrant girls' home, in New York, Boston, and Philadelphia. She was a women's suffrage leader in Illinois.

== Personal life ==
Willing died a widow in New York City on October 6, 1916, and left her money to charities.
