= Emily Caroline Chandler Hodgin =

American temperance reformer (1838–1907)

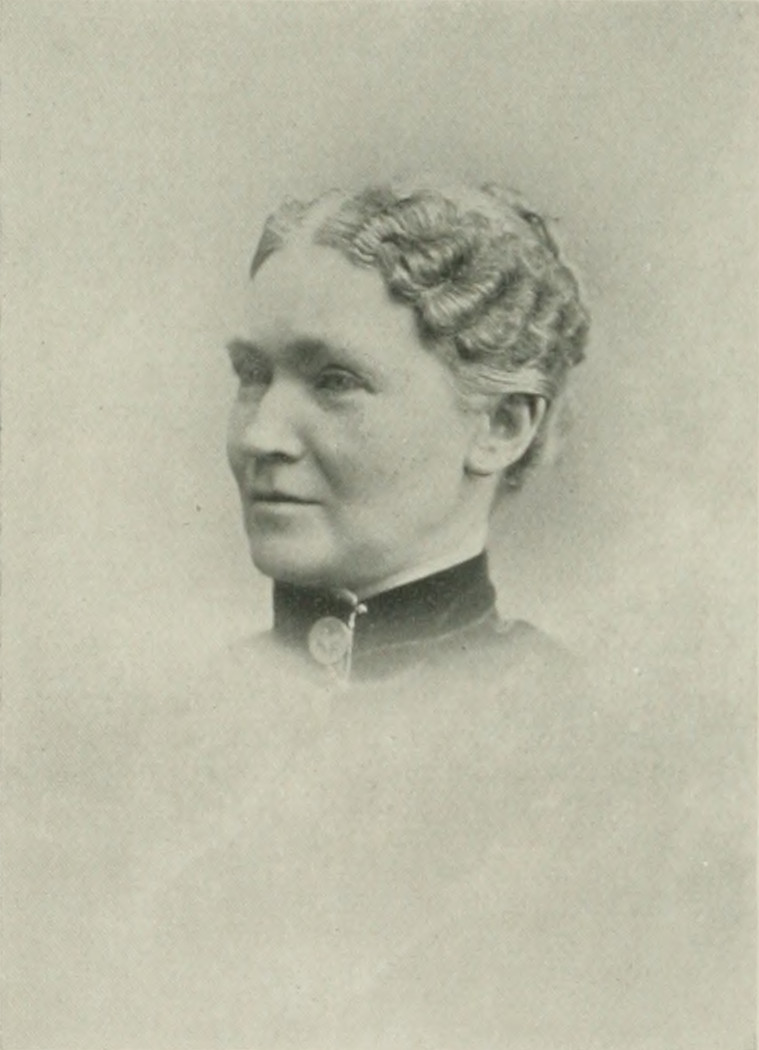
Emily Caroline Chandler Hodgin, "A Woman of the Century"

Emily Caroline Chandler Hodgin (April 12, 1838 – November 13, 1907) was an American temperance reformer. She was one of the leaders in the temperance crusade of Terre Haute, Indiana, in 1872, and was a delegate to the convention in Cleveland, Ohio, where the crusading movement developed into the organization of the Woman's Christian Temperance Union (WCTU). After that, she began the work of organizing forces in neighboring parts of Indiana. She became president of the WCTU in her own county and secretary of the State temperance association. She greatly aided the cause from the lecture platform, for though a member of the Society of Friends, she availed herself of the freedom accorded to the speaker in meetings.

== Early life and education ==
Emily Caroline Chandler was born in Williamsport, Indiana, April 12, 1838. Her father, Hon. Robert A. Chandler, who was of German descent, emigrated from New York to western Indiana while it was yet a wilderness. He was a self-made man and a scholarly lawyer. The mother was cultured and a member of the Dodd family, of Orange, New Jersey.

Hodgin had the advantage of the best schools of Williamsport and her father's large library. Accepting her father's doctrine that every one should learn to be self-supporting, she taught school at an early age, and paid her own way through the Illinois Normal University (now Illinois State University), graduating in 1867, and making a record as a strong student, especially in mathematics.

== Career ==
In 1867, after marriage, she settled in Richmond, Indiana where she served as principal of a ward school, 1867–68, and also taught at a private school in Marion, Indiana. In 1872, she removed to Terre Haute, Indiana, where for many years her husband was a teacher in the State Normal School.

It was in Terre Haute that Hodgin entered the field of work that thereafter chiefly occupied her time and thought. She was one of the leaders in the temperance crusade in the city, and was a delegate to the First Woman's National Temperance Convention in Cleveland, Ohio, in 1874, where the crusading spirit was crystallized by the organization of the WCTU. After that, she began the work of organizing the forces in neighboring parts of the State. In 1878, the strain upon her induced nervous exhaustion, from which she found relief by a six-months retirement in the Jackson Sanatorium in Dansville, Livingston County, New York.

In 1883, she returned to Richmond, and devoted much of her time to furthering the work of the WCTU. She was president of the WCTU in her own county, was secretary of the State Suffrage Association, and was one of the trustees of the Hadley Industrial Home for the education of poor girls. In addition to these lines of work, she received, in 1886, the Chautauqua diploma for a four-year course of study (1881–1885). In 1891–92, she completed a course of biblical and theological study in Earlham College.

== Personal life ==
On August 22, 1867, she married a classmate, Cyrus Wilburn Hodgin of Richmond, Indiana. His career included teaching at Chicago State University, 1892–1893; principal of Hadley's Acadademy, Richmond, Indiana, 1867–1868; principal, high school, Richmond, Indiana, 1868–1869; principal, township graded school, Dublin, Indiana, 1869–1872; teacher of history, Indiana State Normal School, 1872–1881; superintendent, Rushville, Indiana, 1882–1883; principal, Richmond Normal School, 1883–1887; professor of history and political science, Earlham College, Richmond, Indiana, 1887–?. He published Indiana and the Nation, a textbook on the civil government of Indiana, and a large number of articles on historical and educational subjects. In 1869, a daughter, her only child, was born.

Hodgin was a member of the Daughters of the American Revolution. In religion, she was a member of the Society of Friends and availed herself of the freedom accorded to the women of that church to "speak in meeting".

Emily Caroline Chandler Hodgin died at Lafayette Sanitarium, Lafayette, Indiana, November 13, 1907.
