= Harry Ryan =

Harry Ryan may refer to:

- Harry Ryan (cyclist) (1893–1961), British track cycling racer
- Harry Ryan (hurler) (1957–2020), Irish retired hurler
- Harry Ryan (American football) (1868–1953), early professional American football player

== See also ==
- Harold Ryan (disambiguation)
- Henry Ryan (disambiguation)
