= Miami Military Institute =

Coordinates: 39°37′33.3″N 84°22′27.7″W

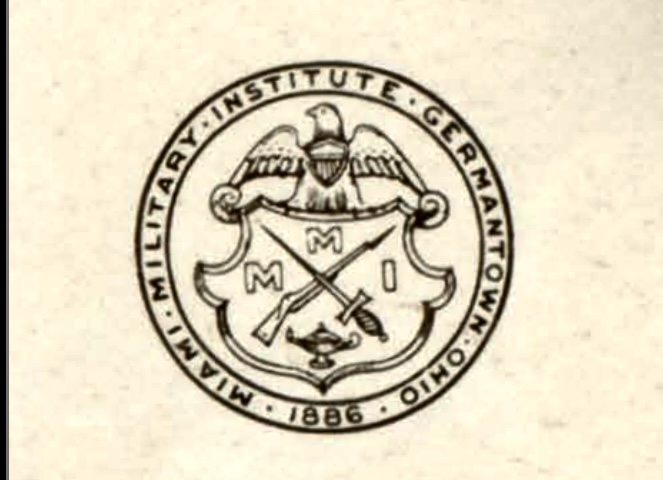

Location
- West Warren Street; Germantown, Ohio; United States

Information
- Type: Military boarding school Private
- Established: 1885 (Twin Valley College 1894 (Miami Military Institute))
- Founder: Col. Orvon Graff Brown
- Closed: 1935
- Grades: 7-12
- Campus: 24 acres (9.7 ha)
- Colors: Blue and white
- Newspaper: The Bayonet (1909-1934)

The Miami Military Institute (MMI) was a college preparatory military academy located in Germantown, Ohio. Originally founded as the Twin Valley College in 1885, the school was reorganized as the all-boys Miami Military Institute in 1894.

== History ==
In 1885, Orvon Graff Brown, a 22-year old professor at the Cincinnati Wesleyan Women's College, leased a disused building in Germantown. The building had been built in 1876 for the failed Germantown Institute and was currently being used as a Militia Armory. On February the 4th,1886, Brown opened the Twin Valley College & The Ohio Conservatory of Music. Initially the school was staffed by instructors from the Cincinnati Wesleyan Women's College, which was headed by Orvon's parents, Rev. W.K and Martha McClellan Brown. The Twin Valley College was a co-educational school with both college and preparatory departments, and the Ohio Conservatory of Music had three branches - one at the Twin Valley College, one in Middletown, Ohio, and one at the Cincinnati Wesleyan.

In 1892, the Browns lost control of the Wesleyan following allegations of mismanagement, resulting in Orvon running the Twin Valley College by himself, lacking the funds to pay a full staff. The colligate-level courses were dropped that year, and the school was turned into a boys-only preparatory school operating under the military educational model. In 1894 the school was officially renamed the Miami Military Institute.

In December 1903 a fire destroyed the original Germantown Institute building, and a new campus was completed by the start of the 1904 school year. The school was graded "A+" by the United States Department of War in 1905, placing it in the top twenty military schools in the country, and resulting in an official Junior Reserve Officers' Training Corps program being established at the school. The first regular United States Army officer assigned as commandant at the school was Benjamin Piatt Runkle, who was posted to the school for over four years. In 1909, the Cadet corps & faculty traveled to Washington D.C to participate in the Inauguration of William Howard Taft.

Almost 150 cadets of the academy served in World War I, more than half of them as commissioned officers. Seven of these cadets died in the conflict.

The school grew significantly throughout the 1910s and 1920s, but was significantly effected by the Great Depression. In 1932, the school declared bankruptcy. A new corporation, "The Miami Military Institute, Inc." was formed that year by Orvon's sons, Reed McClellan, Samuel Reed, and Orvon Graff Jr. The school tried to adapt, opening day student programs including shuttle services between Germantown and Dayton, Ohio, but these efforts proved too little. Orvon Graff Brown died in April, 1934, by which point only a half dozen full-time students were in attendance. Despite opening for the 1935 school year in September 1934, the school closed its doors for the last time by January 1935.

Following several years of liquidation, the Brown family sold the school campus in January 1939.

=== Post-M.M.I building history ===
From the 1945 to the 1990s, the buildings that were once M.M.I acted as a Methodist camp, and was affectionately known as "Camp Miami" by locals. The campus was utilized as a temporary annex by Germantown public schools during the 1950s, and for training exercises by the Ohio Army National Guard during the 1960s. Due to increasing maintenance costs, the former MMI Campus was sold in the 1990s and a new building was constructed nearby for Camp Miami, which continued to operate into 2001. It was later a very popular location for Urban exploration from the 1990s to 2015.

The Germantown Veterans Memorial Park is situated on M.M.I's former parade and athletic field.

By 2015, the building was in an extreme state of disrepair. Most of the exterior windows had been broken by vandals and urban explorers trying to gain entry, and the roof was on the verge of collapsing due to lack of maintenance. Restoration was deemed impossible, so during the summer of 2015, the buildings on the site were demolished, and the asphalt parking lot removed. As of 2016, the only remaining structure on the site is the M.M.I's flagpole. As of 2025, a public memorial park dedicated to M.M.I is being established on the former campus grounds.

== Museum displays ==
Artifacts from M.M.I can be found on display at both the Germantown historical society museum, located on West Center Street, and at the Veteran's Memorial Museum Foundation, located on South Main Street.
