= Harold Ryan =

Harold Ryan may refer to:

- Harold L. Ryan (1923–1995), U.S. federal judge from Idaho
- Harold M. Ryan (1911–2007), American politician and judge from Michigan
- Harold Ryan, former president of Bungie and CEO of ProbablyMonsters
- Harold Ryan, character in the Kurt Vonnegut play, Happy Birthday, Wanda June

== See also ==
- Harry Ryan (disambiguation)
