= Harriet Newell Kneeland Goff =

American temperance reformer (1828–1901)

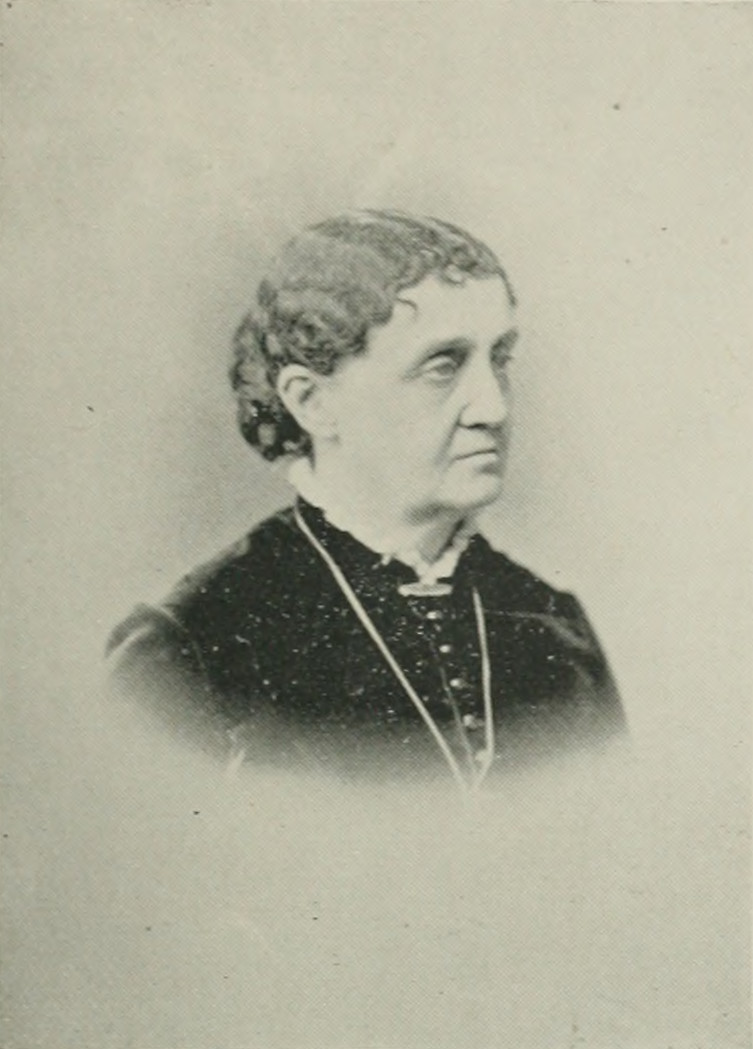
- Photo in A Woman of the Century
- Born: Harriet Newell Kneeland; October 10, 1828; Watertown, New York, U.S.
- Died: April 10, 1901 (aged 72); Washington, D.C., U.S.
- Resting place: Glenwood Cemetery
- Occupations: author, temperance reformer
- Spouse: Azro Goff
- Writing career
- Pen name: H. N. K. Goff
- Language: English

Harriet Newell Kneeland Goff (née, Kneeland; pen name, H. N. K. Goff; October 10, 1828 - April 10, 1901) was an American temperance reformer and author. For many years, she was a contributor to the public press, and three books followed, Was it an Inheritance? (1876), Other Fools and Their Doings, Or, Life Among the Freedmen (1880), and Who Cares (1887). Goff was elected Right Worthy Grand Vice-Templar of the British branch in the rupture of the International Organisation of Good Templars. She was an international temperance lecturer beginning in 1870, and for six years, her special work was for the employment of police matrons in Brooklyn, New York. Goff was the first woman ever placed upon a nominating committee to name candidates for the presidency and vice-presidency of the United States.

== Early life and education ==
Harriet Newell Kneeland was born in Watertown, New York, October 10, 1828, of New England ancestry. Her father, Mr. Kneeland, was a mechanic and a frequent contributor to the press of his day. He died while still young. Harriet was a quiet, thoughtful, old-fashioned child, with quaint speech, odd and original ideas, delicate health and extreme sensibility to criticism. When 11 years of age, she was received into the Presbyterian Church, and retained that connection. A year previously, her mother had removed to Pennsylvania and again married. In the stepfather's house, she often met itinerant lecturers upon temperance and anti-slavery. She read publications on those subjects, as well as Sunday school and other religious books.

== Career ==
At 16, she began to teach a public school in a country district, boarding among her pupils. During several years, teaching alternated with study, mainly in Grand River Institute (now Grand River Academy), Ohio. At 22, she relinquished her cherished purpose of becoming a missionary, and married Azro Goff, a young merchant and postmaster in the town of her residence, but continued her studies. A few years later, they were passengers upon the steamer Northern Indiana when it was burned upon Lake Erie, with the loss of over 30 lives; and while clinging to a floating plank new views of human relations and enforced isolations opened before her, and she there resolved henceforth to follow the leanings of her own conscience.

=== Social reformer ===
She devoted much time and effort to the unfortunate. She entered the temperance lecture field in 1870, and traveled throughout the United States, in Canada, New Brunswick, Nova Scotia, Newfoundland, England, Ireland, Scotland and Wales, speaking more or less extensively in all, and under various auspices. In 1872, she was delegated by three societies of Philadelphia, where she then resided, to attend the prohibition convention in Columbus, Ohio, and there, she became the first woman ever placed upon a nominating committee to name candidates for the presidency and vice-presidency of the United States. To her presence and influence was due the incorporation of woman's suffrage into the platform of that party at that time."Who Cares" (Philadelphia, 1887).

Adhering to the British branch in the rupture of the International Organisation of Good Templars, Goff was in 1878 elected Right Worthy Grand Vice-Templar, and the following year, was re-elected in Liverpool, England, over so popular a candidate as Margaret Bright Lucas, on account of her acceptable and still desired services in the supervision and secretaryship of the order in America. She joined and lectured for the Woman's Temperance Crusade early in 1874 in several States, was a leader in the organization and work of the Woman's Temperance Association of Philadelphia, afterwards rechristened the Woman's Christian Temperance Union. She was a delegate therefrom to the first national convention of the Woman's Christian Temperance Union in Cleveland, Ohio, and again from the New York State Union to the convention in Nashville, Tennessee, in 1887. Her especial work from 1886 to 1892 was for the employment of police matrons in Brooklyn, New York, her place of residence for the previous 14 years, whence she removed to Washington, D.C. in 1892. As committee of the New York State Union, she endeavored to procure such amendments of an ineffective law as would place every arrested woman in the State in care of an officer of her own sex. For this she labored with diligence, drafting and circulating petitions, originating bills, interviewing mayors, commissioners, councilmen, committees of senate and assembly, and individual members of those bodies, and governors on behalf of the measure, and by personal observations in station-house cells and lodging-rooms, jails and courts, originated or substantiated her every argument. She was a believer in the cause of woman suffrage.

=== Author ===
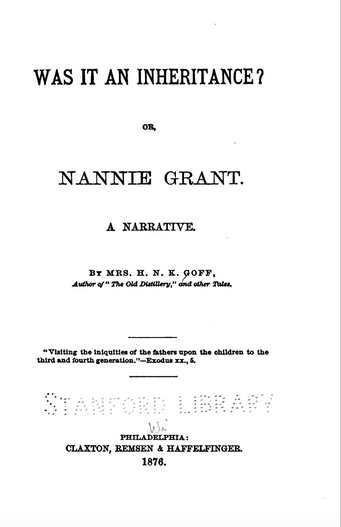
Was it an Inheritance?

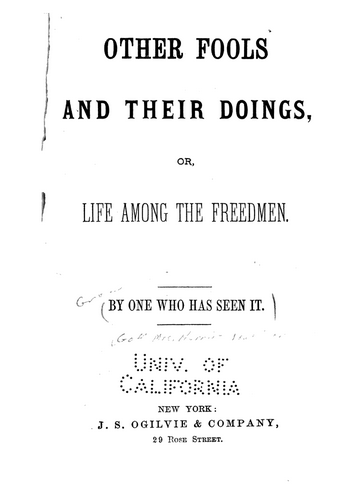
Other Fools and Their Doings

For many years, she was a contributor to the public press, her first article being published in the Knickerbocker News. In 1876, she published her first book, Was it an Inheritance? (Philadelphia, 1876) and early the next year, she became traveling correspondent of the New York Weekly Witness," besides contributing to Arthur's Lady's Home Magazine, the Sunday-school Times, the Independent and other journals. In 1880, she published her second book, Other Fools and Their Doings, Or, Life Among the Freedmen, issuing the sixth edition that year. Her third volume was, Who Cares (Philadelphia, 1887).

Goff acquired such fame as an advocate of reforms in the interest of women that her reputation as an author was lost sight of, but was recalled by her suit against T. B. Peterson & Bro., of Philadelphia, for US$135 and the interest on that sum. Goff alleged in her complaint that she wrote a story entitled Who Cares? and that when she turned the manuscript over to Peterson & Brother, she took their word that it would make 300 pages, and she covenanted and agreed to pay therefor the sum of $1.33 and 1/3 cent per stereotyped page. That was $400. After it was published, she claimed that it only came to 198 pages, and that the publisher would not return the difference. Further than this, although set forth as a cause of action, the story is about a poor erring girl, a Magdalen, who finds it very hard to lead a reformed life. Everybody's hand is raised, not to help her, but to push her back into the mud again. Peterson & Brother issued a circular to the newspapers saying that the story was "an autobiography in the form of a novel". Goff wrote back to have it turned end for end, "A novel in the form of an autobiography". But they went ahead, and Goff was wroth because it was advertised that this was the story of her life. She thought of beginning suit against Peterson & Brother in Pennsylvania, for libel, with large damages. There was one more issue: she wanted it published anonymously, and got Dr. Theodore L. Cuyler to write an introduction. But the publisher printed her name on the title page, and she didn't like that.

== Personal life ==
She died April 10, 1901, in Washington D.C., and was buried in Glenwood Cemetery of that city.

== Selected works ==
- Was it an Inheritance?; Or, Nannie Grant: A Narrative, 1876
- Other Fools and Their Doings, Or, Life Among the Freedmen, 1880
- Who Cares, 1887
