= Allentown Masonic Temple =

- U.S. National Register of Historic Places
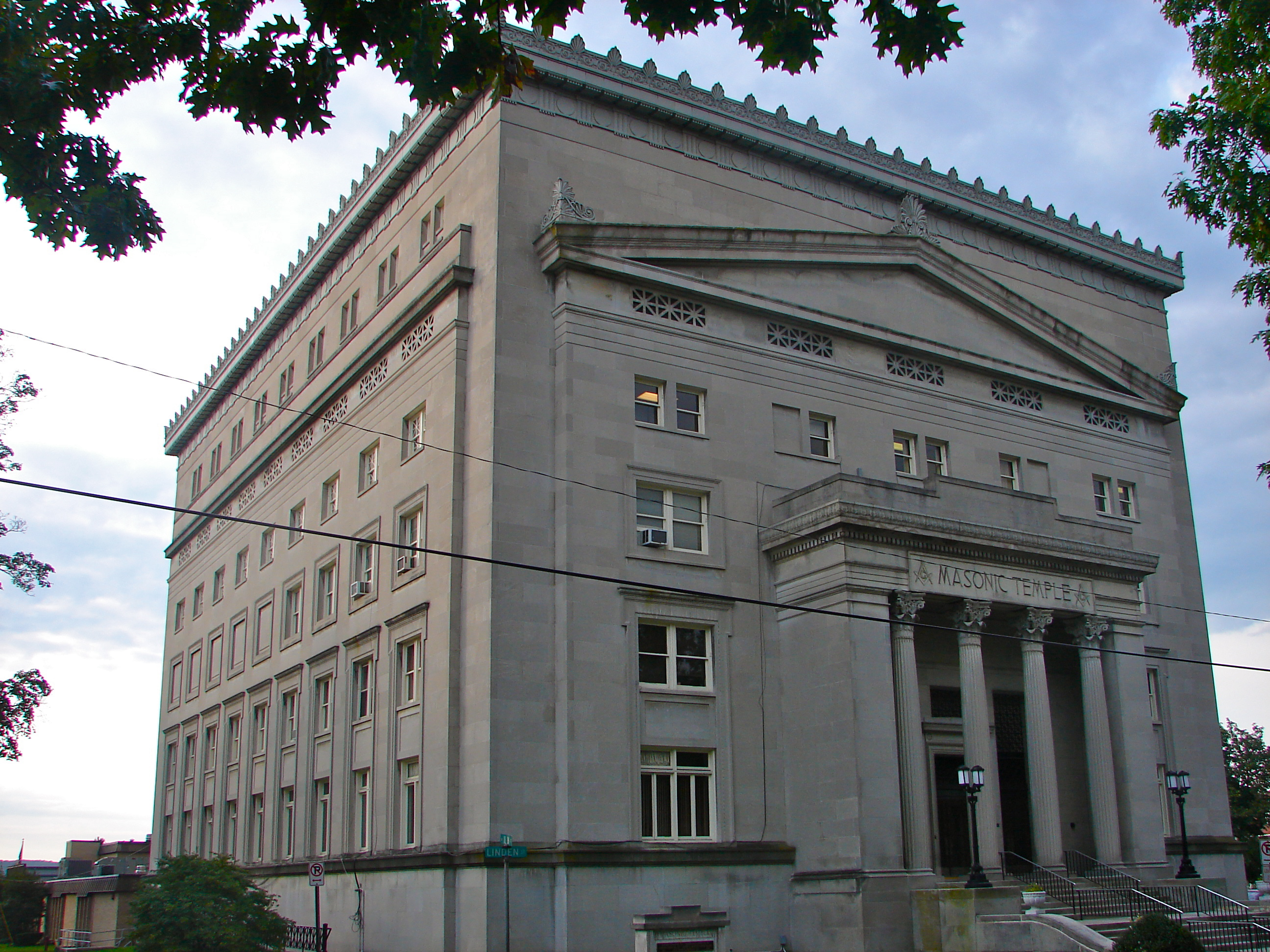
- Allentown Masonic Temple, October 2011

- Location within Pennsylvania Location within the United States
- Location: 1524 West Linden Street, Allentown, Pennsylvania, U.S.
- Coordinates: 40°35′55″N 75°29′25″W
- Area: Less than one acre
- Built: 1923-1925
- Architect: Schmid, Richard G.; William & Gangrene & Co.
- Architectural style: Classical Revival
- NRHP reference No.: 04000402
- Added to NRHP: May 05, 2004

The Allentown Masonic Temple is an historic Masonic building located in the city of Allentown in Lehigh County, Pennsylvania.

It was added to the National Register of Historic Places in 2004.

== History and architectural features ==
In March 1920, Allentown's Morning Call newspaper reported that five hundred and fifty members of the Masonic fraternity had gathered on March 8 at the Odd Fellows' Hall in Allentown to launch a campaign to raise $400,000 to fund the construction of a new Masonic temple. The newspaper described the planned building as one that would be "dedicated to Almighty God and for the purpose of developing he highest standards of and character in the manhood of the city."

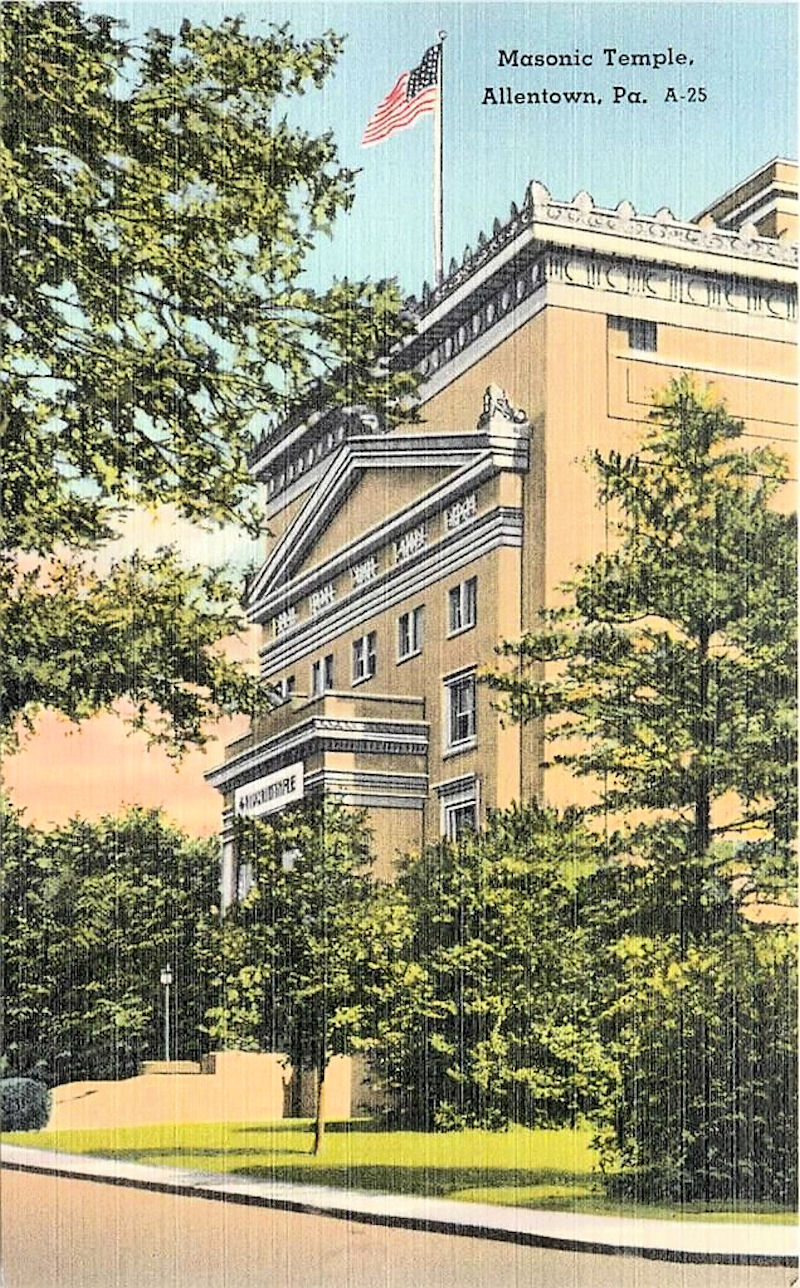
Postcard of facade

In October 1921, the Morning Call announced that construction of the new temple would begin "very shortly," explaining that the building committee had chosen R. G. Schmidt of R. G. Schmidt & Company to serve as both the architect and contractor for the project, and adding that leaders of the Masonic fraternity in Allentown had just made their final payment on the land for the building's planned location at the corner of Fulton and Linden streets within the past week.

Built between 1923 and 1925, this five-story structure made of limestone was erected on a reinforced concrete foundation, and was designed in the Neoclassical architectural style. The cornerstone was laid on July 16, 1923 in a special ceremony presided over by Abraham M. Beitler, the grandmaster of the Grand Lodge of Pennsylvania. By mid-1925, the estimated cost for construction was revised upward to a range of between $750,000 to more than $1,000,000.

The edifice measures ninety-seven feet, six inches wide and one hundred and fifty feet deep, and features elaborate stone and terra cotta trim, and four large and imposing fluted composite columns at its main entrance.

In early 1928, General Harry Clay Trexler donated two thousand Masonic-related books to the Allentown Masonic Temple to create "the largest and most complete private Masonic library in the State" that was "to be excelled by few, if any, private libraries anywhere, not only as to the condition of the works, but also as to the nature of the volumes." Trexler, who had been awarded the rank of general in the Pennsylvania National Guard during the Spanish–American War and World War I, and had become a prominent civic leader and industrialist, had achieved the rank of thirty-third degree Mason by the time of his death five years later. Newspapers at the time described him as having "an extensive knowledge of Masonic ideals."

The temple adjacent to the Scottish Rite Cathedral was built in 1968.

== See also ==
- List of historic places in Allentown, Pennsylvania
