= Mary R. Denman =

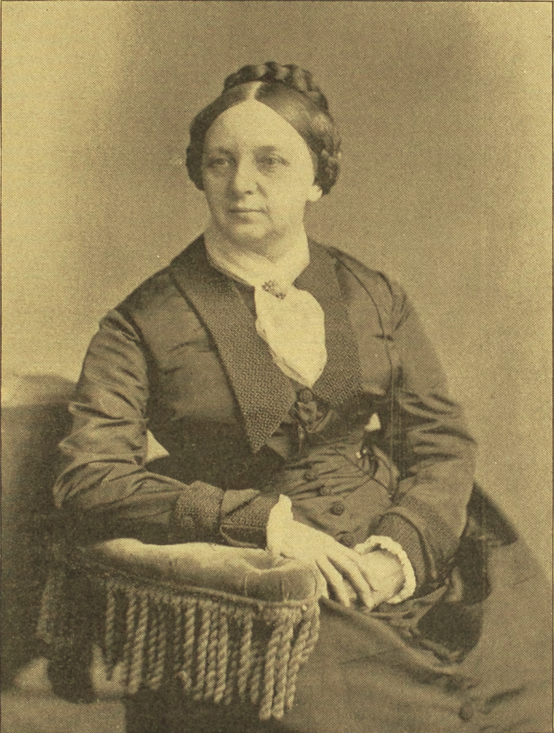
Mary R. Denman

Mary R. Denman (August 13/31, 1823 – November 23/27, 1899) was an American temperance activist and social reform leader. She was one of the organizers and served as the first president of the New Jersey Woman's Christian Temperance Union. She served as a member of the Board of Directors of the Home for the Friendless and was prominent and active in other charities.

== Early life ==
Mary Ransley Cross was born in Newark, New Jersey, August 13 or 31, 1823. She was adopted as a child by her uncle, Abram Cross, who lived at Mulberry and Park Streets.

== Career ==
Circa 1848, she married Isaac Marsh Denman (1821-1866), a carriage manufacturer, who had an extensive business in New Orleans. He was president of the Mechanics' Bank, Newark, when he died, on November 25, 1866. He left a large fortune. The couple had three sons: Isaac Rolfe, Abram Cross, and Frederick Arthur.

On 1873, Denman, having received a wonderful uplift in her spiritual life at the Methodist National Camp Meeting at Sea Cliff, New York, felt herself prepared special religious work. Denman was not a Methodist, but an earnest member of the Evangelical branch of the Protestant Episcopal church.

At one of Mrs. FitzGerald's Friday meetings, in Newark, Rev. Mr. See, a Presbyterian minister, told of a wonderful meeting he had attended in Brooklyn, conducted by women. Denman had read of the work of the Women's Crusade, and she was anxious to know what the women of Brooklyn were doing. Upon the first opportunity, she met with them at the YMCA. A large gathering was present, and the Rev. Mr. Boole introduced Denman to the Assembly. Listening to the reports of these women, of work accomplished, Denman felt condemned, knowing the great need of temperance work in Newark. Mrs. William P. Jube, of Newark, was also at that meeting, and they concluded to carry the subject to the eight o'clock daily morning prayer meeting, at the YMCA rooms. There they told their story, and a clergyman, affectionately called "Father Osborne," said: "It is high time such work was begun in Newark, and I appoint Mrs. Denman leader."

At this time a singular circumstance occurred. Someone (who was never known) put in the newspaper a call for a temperance meeting, to be held at the same place and hour as a women's holiness meeting was always held. Many saw the call and responded, and others came to attend the original meeting, among them, Denman. The leader appointed for the holiness meeting, not understanding the call for the temperance meeting, failed to put in an appearance, and Mrs. C. A. McCall was appointed leader, and upon her came the honor of leading the first woman's temperance meeting held in the state. Denman, coming in late, was astonished to find a stranger in the chair, and the subject — temperance.

After this the interest grew, and as many men were out of employment and attended the meetings, after meetings were instituted, which often lasted till nearly noon. About this time, a woman from Brooklyn came over and urged opening a four o'clock meeting, to be held daily. This was done in an unoccupied store on Newark's Broad Street. These meetings were never closed until about 1890, when many of the old people were dead and the evening meetings took the attention of the younger ones. Mary G. Hill, as long as she lived, and Denman, till poor health ended her ability to participate, stood by those meetings, commenced in a store-building with seats of boards, laid on empty boxes. They gave up their New Year days, and other public holidays, to gather the drunkards around them and talk about the temperance movement.

The time soon came when it was felt best to organize into a Temperance Union, still taking the Brooklyn women as their example. When the election for president came, there was a tie between Denman and Hill, but the former withdrew in favor of Hill, who became the President of Newark's first Union.

About the same time Julia Barker, of Rahway, New Jersey, organized in that city what became the second Union in the state. Now came the time, for New Jersey to take her place among the states on the temperance question. A circular letter was sent to every town where a YMCA was established, calling upon Christian women interested in the cause of temperance to meet in the Clinton Street Methodist Episcopal church, Newark, to organize a State Union, November 11, 1874. This first Convention lasted two days. Denman was unanimously elected State President.

The next state meeting was held at Rahway, in the spring of 1875, after which the conventions were held semi-annually, the fall meetings for business, the spring meetings of a more informal character, eminently spiritual, and for mutual encouragement in the work. Mrs. Brundage was Secretary; Miss Julia Barker, Treasurer, and Mrs. Nobles, State Vice-president. At the Rahway meeting, Mrs. Judge Haines became interested, and started the next Union in Elizabeth, New Jersey. Mrs. Haines afterwards became Corresponding Secretary, and at one time treasurer of the state. Mrs. Nobles and her husband, Rev. John Nobles, with Denman, now made the tour of the state, especially the southern part, and Unions were established, or the nucleus of them, at various places along the coast. Atlantic City, New Jersey, at that time consisting of only a few small houses and tents, was visited in 1877, and meetings were held there and in all the towns in that part of the state. With Mrs. Brundage, Denman visited Oxford Furnace, Belvidere, and towns away back in the country and among the mountains.

Annie Turner Wittenmyer, National President, hearing of New Jersey's work, appointed national meetings at Ocean Grove, which were held annually, till the state took up that work. Denman and Wittenmeyer went through the Southern States, holding meetings and opening the way for those who followed later on. Through all these years, Denman was in very frail health, many times returning from her trips to spend days or often weeks in her bed.

== Later life ==
In the winter of 1880, Denman was prostrated with paralysis, the result of her seven years' labor in the temperance cause. It then became necessary for her to resign her state position, and in the fall of 1881, Sarah Jane Corson Downs was elected to fill her place.

Mary R. Denman died November 23 or 27, 1899, Newark, New Jersey.
