= John Morgan Walden =

American bishop, newspaper editor and journalist

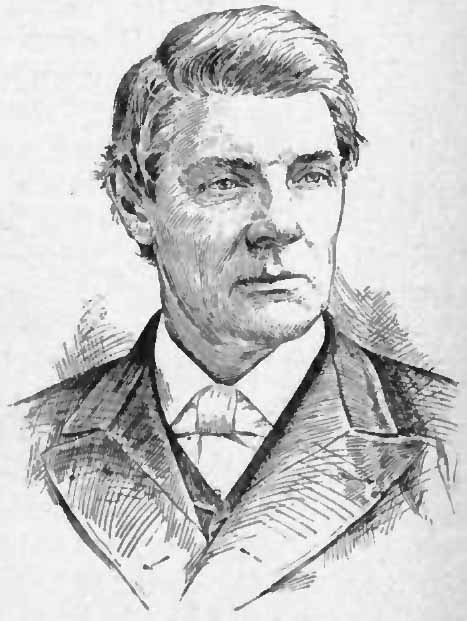
- Title: Bishop

Personal life
- Born: February 11, 1831 Lebanon, Ohio
- Died: January 21, 1914 (aged 82) Daytona Beach, Florida
- Resting place: Spring Grove Cemetery; Cincinnati, Ohio
- Spouse: Martha Young (m. 1859)
- Children: 5
- Pen name: Ned Law
- Occupation: Bishop, journalist, soldier

Religious life
- Religion: Methodism
- Denomination: Methodist Episcopal Church

Military service
- Allegiance: United States (Union)
- Service/branch: Union army
- Rank: Lieutenant colonel

John Morgan Walden (February 11, 1831 – January 21, 1914) was an American bishop of the Methodist Episcopal Church. He also gained notability as a newspaper editor and journalist, as a State Superintendent of Education in Kansas, as an officer in the Union Army, and as an Official in his Christian denomination.

== Birth and family ==
John Morgan Walden was born in Lebanon, Ohio, the son of Jesse and Matilda (née Morgan) Walden. The family moved to Hamilton County, Ohio in 1832. John was of Virginian ancestry, his great-grandfather Walden having moved from Culpeper County, Virginia to Kentucky in 1770, and his grandfather Benjamin to Ohio in 1802. After the death of his mother in 1833. John went to live with relatives near Cincinnati.

John married Martha Young of Cheviot, Ohio July 3, 1859. They had five children.

== Education and early life ==
Walden attended a local school in Cincinnati until 1844, when he went to work. Becoming a wandering laborer, he found employment as a carpenter. He became interested in the writings of Thomas Paine, whereby Walden became a skeptic. He read Sir Walter Scott and Oliver Goldsmith. His own early romantic stories were published under the pen name "Ned Law" in the Hamilton, Ohio Telegraph from 1849 until 1853.

After attending Farmers' College in College Hill, Ohio in 1849, Walden taught school for a year in Miami County, Ohio. It was there that he was converted by a Methodist Circuit Rider. Returning to Farmers' College, Walden graduated in 1852. He then continued to teach there for two years.

== Journalism career and Kansas ==
In 1854 John went to Fairfield, Illinois, where he published the Independent Press. In his editorials he opposed the liquor traffic and so-called "squatter sovereignty." Illinoisans starved him out by refusing to support his paper, and in 1855 he returned to Ohio, where he became a reporter with the Cincinnati Commercial.

John became deeply interested in the Kansas troubles while reporting from the Democratic National Convention of 1856. Indeed, he went to Kansas, where he established the Quindaro Chindowan, a Free-Soil paper in the Free State port-of-entry town of Quindaro. He was a delegate to five Free-State conventions, including the Leavenworth Constitutional Convention of 1858. That same year he campaigned over half the Territory, opposing the Lecompton Constitution.

John Morgan Walden served in the Kansas Territorial Legislature in 1857. He also was the State Superintendent of Education for a time.

== Ordained ministry ==
John returned again to Ohio, where on September 8, 1858, he was admitted on trial to the Cincinnati Annual Conference of the M.E. Church. His first two years of ministry were spent on various circuits. In 1860 he was admitted to the Conference in full connection and sent to the York Street Church in Cincinnati.

While he was there the American Civil War began. Rev. Walden became very active in the war effort, raising two regiments to defend the city against threatening attacks. He joined the Union Army, where he achieved the rank of lieutenant colonel.

Rev. Walden served with the Ladies' Home Mission in Cincinnati (1862–64). In the post-war years, he helped many African Americans through his work as corresponding secretary of the Western Freedman's Aid Commission and also with the Methodist Freedman's Aid Society.

In 1867 Walden was appointed Presiding Elder of the East Cincinnati District. In 1868 he was elected Publishing Agent of the Western Methodist Book Concern, also in Cincinnati. His penchant for statistics and organization, his business ability, and his sympathetic cooperation with the preachers made the Concern a financial success under his stewardship.

== Episcopal ministry ==
John Morgan Walden was elected a Bishop by the 1884 General Conference of the Methodist Episcopal Church. During his service he presided at some time or other over every Conference in the U.S.A. He also inspected missions in Mexico, South America, Europe, China and Japan. He did much to shape the missionary policy of his Church.

Walden was a delegate to the Ecumenical Conferences in London in 1881, in Washington in 1891 and in Toronto in 1911. With respect to church organization, he insisted on strict adherence to the written law of the church. Otherwise, he was more liberal in his views.

== Legacy and honors ==
- In recognition of his work for African Americans, in 1900 Central Tennessee College in Nashville was renamed in his honor as Walden University (Tennessee).

== Death and burial ==
Walden died on January 21, 1914, at Daytona Beach, Florida, and is buried in Spring Grove Cemetery in Cincinnati, Ohio. He was survived by his wife and three of their five children.

== See also ==
- List of bishops of the United Methodist Church
