= Henry Ryan (minister) =

American-Canadian minister (1775-1833)

- Title: Superintendent

Personal life
- Born: April 22, 1775 Massachusetts, United States
- Died: September 2, 1833 (aged 58) Gainsborough, Upper Canada
- Spouse: Huldah Laird

Religious life
- Religion: Christianity
- Church: Methodist Episcopal Church

Henry Ryan (22 April 1775 – 2 September 1833) was a US-Canadian Methodist minister. He was born in Massachusetts and died in Gainsborough, near Grimsby, Upper Canada.

In 1812, Ryan was appointed superintendent for Upper Canada, but also served de facto as superintendent for Lower Canada during the War of 1812.
