= Abby Fisher Leavitt =

American social reformer (1836–1897)

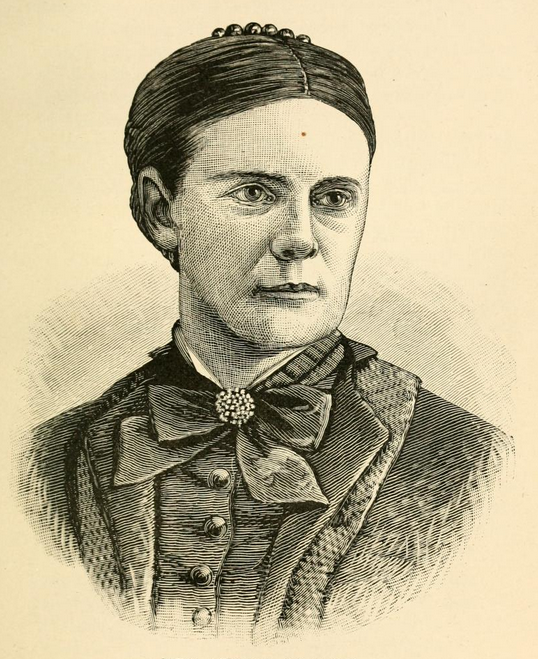
- Born: Abby Fisher; 1836; Bangor, Maine, U.S.
- Died: May 23, 1897 (aged 60–61); Santa Barbara, California, U.S.
- Occupations: social reformer; writer
- Spouse: Samuel K. Leavitt (m. 1866; died 1894)
- Writing career
- Language: English
- Subject: temperance

Abby Fisher Leavitt (née Fisher; 1836 – May 23, 1897) was an American social reformer and one of the prominent figures of the Ohio Women's Crusade. Leavitt also served as Secretary of the Baptist Women's Foreign Missionary Society of Ohio and Treasurer of the Women's Crusade Temperance Union. She was the leader of the "Praying Band", who, in the spring of 1874, daily marched down to the esplanade of Cincinnati, visiting saloons, and holding meetings inside or outside of liquor saloons, and on one occasion, was arrested and temporarily imprisoned for her temerity. She was a co-publisher of the newspaper of the National Woman's Christian Temperance Union (WCTU). In 1891, as the "Round the World Missionary of the WCTU", the World's WCTU elected Leavitt its life president.

== Early life and education ==
Abby (sometimes spelled, "Abbie") Fisher was born at Bangor, Maine, in 1836. Her home was situated at the corner of Harlow and Cumberland streets.

In 1854, at the age of nineteen, Leavitt graduated from the Young Ladies' High School of her native town.

== Career ==
She went South as a teacher soon after leaving school, remaining until the civil war broke out. In the autumn of 1861, she become principal of a grammar school in Evansville, Indiana, and remained there until 1866, when she married Samuel K. Leavitt, a lawyer of Evansville. He had served as Captain of Company H, 65th Indiana Infantry Regiment during the civil war.

In 1870, Mr. Leavitt was ordained a Baptist minister, and was immediately called to the charge of the First Baptist Church of Keokuk, Iowa, where he served a pastorate until 1872, when he was invited to the First Baptist Church of Cincinnati, where he and his wife labored side by side. Besides leading in plans for the promotion of home and foreign missionary work, teaching in Sunday-school, visiting the poor, and interesting herself particularly in the young people of the church, Leavitt was State Secretary of the Baptist Women's Foreign Missionary Society of Ohio, where her efforts resulted in a marked increase in contributions to the work.

When the crusade burst upon the women of Ohio, Leavitt was among the first to take her place in the ranks of workers, and, on the principle of the "survival of the fittest," was at once promoted to the leadership of the "Praying Band." Day after day, for weeks, accompanied by a long procession of Christian workers, she visited saloons, holding religious services within whenever permission was granted, but outside, if it was refused, and always closing up the day's work with an earnest Gospel meeting in the church from which the bands had gone out in the morning. The church would be filled to overflowing with crowds of men and women who wanted salvation. At these meetings, hundreds signed the pledge, and asked the prayers of Christians.

On May 16, 1874, while engaged in this work, Leavitt, with forty-two others, wives of clergymen and other leading citizens, was arrested and taken to jail. It was a strange story, but suffice it that the mayor said the women shouldn't pray upon the sidewalk's edge. Hardly believing the threat against them would be executed, they went out as usual. Being denied admission to a saloon, they knelt upon the pavement, and just as Leavitt began singing, "Rock of ages, cleft for me," a policeman laid his hand on her shoulder, saying, "You are my prisoner." They marched to jail, continuing the hymn. There, they held a prayermeeting, in the midst of which stood the mayor, unable to escape, while men were weeping on every side. They were locked into a corridor, and Leavitt talked through the grated doors with several of the prisoners. She found a woman who had been arrested because of drunkenness. "It is a curious conundrum," said Leavitt, "that here's one woman locked up for getting drunk, and another equally locked up for trying to get people not to be drunk. Curious country this is, anyway!" After their arrest, the women changed their plans of work, going to saloons in companies of two and three instead of by eighties and hundreds. Gospel temperance meetings were held in churches, jails, and hospitals, cottage prayer-meetings in neighborhoods, amid constant efforts made to extend the temperance work.

When the "Praying Band of Cincinnati" was reorganized into the WCTU, Leavitt was chosen president. The organization's headquarters of the Union on Vine street were open every day for a Gospel meeting, often conducted by her. For years, Leavitt served as treasurer of the National WCTU, and her appeals for help, considered witty and convincing, were among the humors of the First Woman's National Temperance Convention. She was the first woman elected at that convention for president of the WCTU, which position she at once declined.

Leavitt was associated with the National WCTU's paper, serving for two years as a member of its publishing committee. Much of Leavitt's later life was spent writing.

== Death ==
Leavitt died in Santa Barbara, California, May 23, 1897. Her husband preceded her in death, in the same city, April 18, 1894.
