= Annie Turner Wittenmyer =

American temperance activist

Annie Wittenmyer
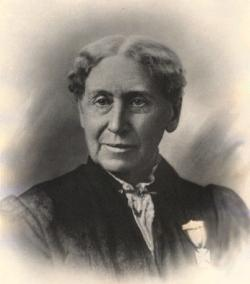
- Born: Sarah Turner; August 26, 1827 Adams County, Ohio, U.S.
- Died: February 2, 1900 (aged 72) Pottstown, Pennsylvania, U.S.
- Occupation: Social reformer; charitable organization leader
- Notable awards: Iowa Women's Hall of Fame
- Spouse: William Wittenmyer

Annie Turner Wittenmyer (August 26, 1827 – February 2, 1900) was an American charitable organization leader, known for social reform, relief work, and her writing. She served as the first National President of the Woman's Christian Temperance Union (WCTU), seventh National President of the Woman's Relief Corps (WRC), and also served as president of the Non-Partisan National Woman's Christian Temperance Union. In 2007, Wittenmyer was inducted into the Iowa Women's Hall of Fame.

== Early life and education ==
Sarah "Annie" Turner was born in Sandy Springs, Adams County, Ohio on the 26th of August, 1827, to John G. Turner and Elizabeth (Smith) Turner. At the age of twelve, Annie published her first poem and was regularly published in many different papers. Showing great talent in literature. She attended a seminary for girls. She married merchant William Wittenmyer at age 20. In 1850, they moved to Keokuk, Iowa, and she started a Sunday School and a tuition-free school for underprivileged children in 1853. She also developed a Methodist Episcopal Church (MEC) congregation from these children and wrote several hymns. Three of her four children died before reaching adulthood. Between 1860 and 1864, Annie divorced her husband on the grounds of abandonment.

== Career ==
=== Civil War ===
When the American Civil War began in April 1861 and reports of suffering soldiers reached the home front, Wittenmyer responded by traveling to military hospitals and describing the horrible conditions she witnessed, prompting local support. When the Keokuk Ladies' Soldiers' Aid Society began in May 1861, she became its "Corresponding Secretary" with the responsibility to maintain contact with sister organizations around the state. In 1862, Wittenmyer became the first woman mentioned by name in an Iowa legislative document when she was appointed as a Sanitary Agent for the Iowa State Sanitary Commission. In 1863, she began advocating for war orphans, helping to create several new Iowa orphanages, including the Iowa Soldiers' Orphans' Home, which was later, in 1948, renamed the Annie Wittenmyer Home. After she encountered public and prolonged disagreements between the Keokuk Ladies Aid Society and the Iowa Army Sanitary Commission, she resigned her local relief work in 1864 to work with the United States Christian Commission in developing their special diet kitchens for Civil War hospitals.

This program was designed both to improve the health of soldiers who were reportedly dying from inadequate diet in hospitals and also to provide a vehicle for women with an interest in missionary work to gain entry to Civil War hospitals and access to soldiers. Mary and Amanda Shelton and other "lady managers" created diet kitchens in a number of hospitals, not without encountering considerable resistance. After the war, Wittenmyer wrote Under the Guns, chronicling her relief work.

=== Post-war work ===
Following the war, she helped found the Woman's Home Missionary Society of the MEC and served as its first corresponding secretary in 1871. She edited the periodicals The Christian Woman and The Christian Child. She wrote several more hymns, and the book Woman's Work for Jesus.

During Wittenmyer's tenure as the first president of the WCTU (1874-79), the organization grew to over 1,000 local chapters. She edited the periodical Our Union and published two books on the topic: History of the Women's Temperance Crusade in 1878 and Women of the Reformation in 1884. She was succeeded by Frances Willard when the organization began to focus on women's suffrage. Wittenmyer strongly opposed women's suffrage; like some women, she believed that entering the corrupt world of partisan politics would greatly reduce women's moral authority. Wittenmyer then returned to medical advocacy for veterans and nurses.

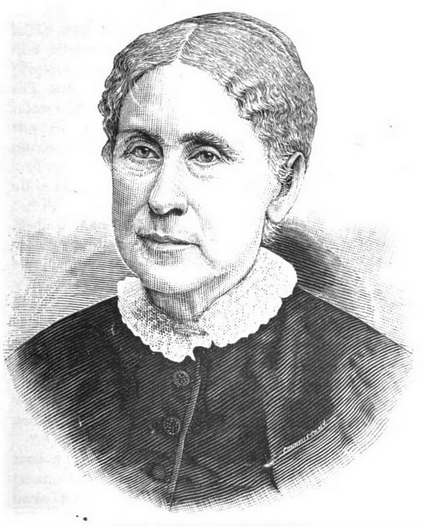
Annie Wittenmyer

In 1889, she was elected National President of the WRC and focused on providing retirement living for nurses and war widows. She lobbied for pensions for retired military nurses, leading to legislation passed in 1892. She published her autobiography Under the Guns in 1895 and received her own pension in 1898.

In 1898, she was elected president of the Non-Partisan National Woman's Christian Temperance Union.

== Death and legacy ==
Wittenmyer died of an asthma attack in Pottstown, Pennsylvania following a lecture and was buried in Sanatoga, Montgomery County.

The Woman's Christian Temperance Union's Annie Wittenmyer White Ribbon Award is named in her honor, and in 1949 the Iowa Soldiers' Orphans' Home was renamed the Annie Wittenmyer Home in her honor. It previously housed a branch of the Davenport Public Library and currently houses The Parks and Recreation Department and several children's organizations.

In 2007, Wittenmyer was inducted into the Iowa Women's Hall of Fame.
