= Sarah Jo Pender =

American murderer (born 1979)

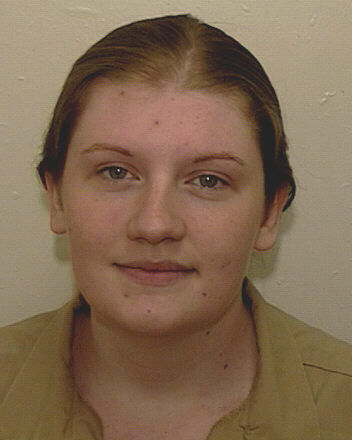
- Born: May 29, 1979 (age 47); Indiana, U.S.
- Conviction: Murder (2 counts)
- Penalty: 110 years imprisonment
- Accomplice: Richard Hull
- Escaped: August 4, 2008
- Escape end: December 22, 2008

Details
- Date: October 24, 2000
- Killed: 2
- Imprisoned at: Indiana Women's Prison

Sarah Jo Pender (born May 29, 1979) is an American woman convicted along with her former boyfriend, Richard Edward Hull, of murdering their roommates, Andrew Cataldi and Tricia Nordman, on October 24, 2000, in Indiana. She has claimed ever since that she is victim of a wrongful conviction. She came to national attention in August 2008 after she escaped from the Rockville Correctional Facility and was featured on America's Most Wanted. She was recaptured by police in December at a house in Chicago. Since spring of 2023, a team out of Georgetown University's "Making an Exoneree" program has been working to exonerate Pender. In January 2026, Pender's appeal was denied, with her earliest possible release date occurring in 2054 when she would be 75 years old.

== Crime ==
In 1997, Sarah Jo Pender graduated from Lawrence Central High School. She went on to attend Purdue University, but dropped out. She worked as a secretary at Carl E. Most and Sons. Richard Hull, her boyfriend, worked as a bouncer at a bar. He had a criminal history that included six misdemeanors and two felony convictions for auto theft and residential entry. Andrew Cataldi, 24, and Tricia Nordman, 25, were both fugitives from a Nevada Correctional Facility where Nordman was serving time for forgery and Cataldi for possession with intent to distribute methamphetamine. According to the police, Hull and Cataldi reportedly sold drugs from their place; this was confirmed by Hull.

=== The murders ===
According to neighbor, Jana Frederick, tensions had been growing for three weeks between the couples, as Hull and Cataldi had frequent arguments. At some point prior to the murders, Hull, who could not legally purchase firearms due to his criminal record, sought to purchase a weapon from the son of Frederick's boyfriend. He was unsuccessful in this attempt but on the morning of October 24, 2000, Hull drove Pender to a local Walmart to purchase a 12-gauge shotgun, ammunition, a soda, and condoms. The clerk who handled the sale of the weapon later reported seeing Hull select the ammunition and bring it to the counter, where Pender then paid for it. The couple then went for an outing with Pender's parents and returned home around 11 p.m. Shortly after returning, Pender left the building to take a walk.

Hull reported that while Pender was away, an argument broke out between Hull and Cataldi regarding money that Hull's sister, Tabitha, owed to Cataldi. Hull said that Cataldi, who knew about the recently purchased shotgun, went into Hull's room to attempt to retrieve the weapon. Hull later told detectives that Cataldi "said he was going to kill my f---ing family". Hull said he attempted to prevent Cataldi's actions, which resulted in a physical struggle between the two men that ended with Hull shooting Cataldi in the chest and also shooting Nordman in the head as well as the chest.

When Pender returned, both victims were dead and Hull had already placed one of their bodies in the back of a truck owned by his friend Ronnie Herron. Hull had borrowed the truck on October 23 to remove items from the basement of the building as part of a plan he had with Cataldi to create a methamphetamine lab in collaboration with a chemist from Las Vegas. Hull and Pender then drove a few blocks away and placed the bodies in a dumpster, where they were later found by Steve Stultz.

On October 25, Pender went to work while Hull borrowed equipment from neighbor, Jana Frederick, to clean up the blood in the house. On October 26, the couple went to Noblesville to return the truck to Herron. Hull then burned several bloodstained items at Herron's home. On the same day, detectives — who by now had identified the victims — searched Hull and Pender's home. They found traces of blood and observed that attempts had been made to conceal the murders. Hull was arrested in Noblesville on October 27, and confessed to both murders. On October 28, Pender gave police a pair of bloodstained pants belonging to Hull. DNA tests confirmed that the blood was that of Nordman and Cataldi. No DNA evidence was found that linked Pender to the murders for which both she and her boyfriend were charged. Pender stated later that "after he committed these murders, I did not call the police but, instead, stayed with him out of love, fear, loyalty and sheer stupidity”. Pender was 21 years old at the time of the murder.

== Murder conviction ==
=== Trial ===
Pender's trial was held at Marion Superior Court in July 2002, with James Nave as the defending attorney, Larry Sells as the prosecuting attorney, and presiding judge Jane Magnus-Stinson. Sells was known for his recently failed campaign to become prosecutor of Hamilton County, in which he had highlighted his success with convicting murderers and violent offenders.

Neither Pender nor Hull testified at the trial.

=== Evidence against Pender ===
Citing the fact that Pender had bought the murder weapon on the morning of the murders and that she later helped Hull dispose of the bodies, Sells told the jury that she had planned the murders and had manipulated Hull into committing them. According to Indianapolis Star journalist Vic Ryckaert, Sells "likened her influence over Hull to the control Manson had over his followers, who committed a string of murders in 1969." The "female Charles Manson" tag has stuck to Pender ever since.

To prove Pender's guilt, Sells relied chiefly on a letter allegedly sent to Hull by Pender in May 2001 and on the testimony of inmate Floyd Pennington. In the letter, Pender took responsibility for the murder. "I wish I could go back and change the events of that night," said the letter. "Drew was so mean that night. I just snapped. I didn't mean to kill them. It must have been the acid. [...] When you said you would try to take the blame, I knew then that you loved me deeply. At first I thought you would tell, but you stuck to your promise." The letter ended with a postscript: "Destroy this." Forensic Document Examiner Lee Ann Harmless testified the letter had been written by Pender. Defense attorney James Nave contended the letter was a fake. He said that Sarah Pender was no "clever criminal mastermind" and that the murder "was not a cleverly planned criminal act. It was an act of the moment." He argued that Richard Hull had shot Cataldi and Nordman because they were about to cut him out of a big drug deal.

Another piece of evidence presented to the jury was the testimony of fellow inmate Floyd Pennington, who had a pen relationship with Sarah Pender for several months. He testified that Pender had admitted her responsibility in the double homicide to him during a meeting they had arranged on September 22, 2001, at Wishard Hospital.

On August 22, 2002, Sarah Pender was found guilty and sentenced to 110 years in prison. Richard Hull pleaded guilty to avoid trial. His defense was that he had been influenced by Sarah Pender at the time of the murder, which was considered at the time by the court as a mitigating factor. He received two 45-year sentences.

=== Controversies ===
==== Letter ====
The only hard piece of evidence presented at Pender's trial as proof of her guilt was a letter that she allegedly wrote on May 16, 2001, and sent to Hull. Hull gave this letter to his attorney, who passed it on to Indianapolis detective Kenneth Martinez between September and October 2001. Pender, her lawyers and her supporters have always said that Hull had manufactured the evidence to shift the responsibility of the murder on her. Several elements support this claim:

1. Richard Hull himself, in a signed affidavit, has recanted and admitted the letter was a forgery. In it, he has explained that while he was detained at the Marion County Jail, he showed samples of Pender's handwriting to fellow inmate Steve Logan and asked him to write the letter for him, since Logan wrote more like a woman. In return, Hull would provide protection on the cell block for Logan, who was a small white guy. By producing the forged letter, Hull's goal was to get a shorter sentence. However, on May 4, 2004, when he appeared for re-sentencing, the court found as an aggravating factor the notarized affidavit in which he admitted the forgery, since it contradicted his earlier testimonies. The court found "an additional aggravating factor [that arose since the original sentencing], which, actually, is very serious. [Hull] appears to have committed perjury in an effort to help his co-defendant manipulate her way out of a criminal conviction for [the] very serious offenses of murder." While admitting the May 16 letter was a forgery resulted in a heavier sentence for Hull, it was of no benefit to Pender.
2. Fingerprints from both Hull and Logan were found on the letter, but not those of Pender.
3. Detective Kenneth Martinez could not find a sealed envelope to match the letter.
4. Most of the eighty letters sent by Pender to Hull were in cursive writing. The alleged self-incriminating letter was printed, which was less common.
5. While Logan has always stopped short of admitting he wrote the May 16 letter, he has testified that Hull showed him letters written by Pender, and also asked him to write some sort of letter as a way to reduce his charges or sentences, which Logan claims he did not do. On another occasion, according to Pender, Logan admitted to a private investigator hired by Pender that Richard Hull had requested for him to forge a letter incriminating her.
6. Between the alleged time of redaction of Pender's alleged self-incriminating letter (May 16, 2001), and the moment it was given to him by Hull's attorney, September–October 2001, pursuant to a search warrant, detective Kenneth Martinez seized all jail correspondence between Hull and Pender on July 17, 2001. He did not find the May 16 letter, although Hull allegedly had kept it during that time.

==== Pennington's testimony ====
At the beginning of September 2001, Floyd Pennington was a habitual offender and violent felon awaiting sentencing on a robbery conviction. He also had a previous record for child molestation, a crime for which he had received a five-year sentence in 1989. On September 20, 2001, he met with Detective Martinez, saying he could arrange a meeting and have Pender admit to him her responsibility for the murders. He had been involved in a correspondence with Pender, which at the time totaled 75 letters. This evolved into a long-distance relationship. After his meeting with Martinez, he wrote to Pender to arrange the date on which she would fake being sick so as to be sent to Wishard Hospital. On September 22, he faked having a kidney problem and both met as planned at the hospital. On September 28, 2001, Pennington gave a statement that he had been able to talk with Pender for three to four hours. He said that when they were left alone for half an hour, Pender admitted to him that she had planned the murders, coerced Hull to kill both Cataldi and Nordman, and that she was present in the house during the murders.

Eleven days after agreeing to testify against Sarah Pender, Pennington was sentenced for his robbery conviction. In 2008, he was released and within months he committed rape. In 2006, Detective Martinez moved to Idaho where he worked for the Ketchum Police Department. In 2008, he had to hand over his resignation following an evidence mishandling scandal.

In 2009, while helping journalist Steve Miller with research on the Sarah Pender case, former prosecutor Larry Sells became aware of the existence of a "snitch list" written by Floyd Pennington and given to Detective Ken Martinez. On that list, Pennington, who was waiting for sentencing, offered to provide information against 17 different persons besides Pender. He wrote "I will help to make buys, wear wire, talk on phone taps or whatever I have to do to make busts on all these crimes."

According to Joel Schumm, a criminal law professor at the Indiana University Robert H. McKinney School of Law, "If Pennington's testimony was important in convicting her and this list seriously undermined his credibility, a judge may well order a new trial because the verdict would no longer be worthy of confidence."

== Escape from prison ==
Pender escaped from Rockville Correctional Center, a maximum-security prison 50 miles (80 km) west of Indianapolis, on August 4, 2008, with the aid of prison guard Scott Spitler and former cellmate Jamie Long.

=== Accomplices ===
At the time of Pender's evasion, Spitler had been a corrections officer at Rockville Correctional Facility for five years. The previous month, he had been placed in a pre-trial diversion program for a misdemeanor charge of battery. Although he was married with children, he was also engaged in an ongoing sexual relationship with Pender behind bars.

Long was an older married woman. She had a criminal history of two felonies and 12 to 15 other convictions. Pender and Long met in 2007 while inmates at the Marion County Jail. They formed an intimate relationship, and Long referred to Pender as her "wife" while they served time at the Indiana Women's Prison in Indianapolis. After being released, Long frequently visited Pender.

=== Circumstances ===
In April 2007, Pender submitted a petition for writ of habeas corpus. On September 5, 2008, in a closing judgment, her petition was dismissed. She later wrote: "Once my appeals were exhausted, I had no hope left and I chose to create my own justice. I served the equivalent of 21 years of my sentence and I felt that was enough. I escaped because I felt justified in doing so."

=== Prison escape ===
Pender reportedly planned her escape with a cell phone provided to her by prison guard Spitler. Pender and Spitler had agreed that he would be paid $15,000 to help her escape. On August 4, 2008, Pender went to the facility's gymnasium, where she changed clothes, hiding her prison uniform above the ceiling tiles, and putting on civilian clothes Spitler had given to her. She then walked toward the fueling area where they had agreed to meet. Spitler told her to get in the van and hide under the seat. He then drove to the prison's gate where he knew from experience that the guard would not search his vehicle. Spitler dropped off Pender at one of the facility's parking lots, where Long picked her up, gave her $140 and drove her to Indianapolis. An inmate count revealed that Pender was missing, and the prison was immediately put on maximum security lock down.

After viewing video surveillance tapes and consulting the guard shack log, investigators identified Spitler as Pender's accomplice. He was arrested on August 5, 2008, and charged with assisting a criminal, official misconduct, sexual misconduct, and trafficking with an inmate. In February 2009, he was sentenced to eight years in prison. Long was arrested on August 7, 2008, after Spitler told investigators that she was the person who had picked up Pender. She was charged with aiding an escape, a class C felony, and sentenced to seven years in prison.

In September 2008, TV show America's Most Wanted ran a feature on Pender. In October 2008, Pender was added to the U.S. Marshals 15 most wanted fugitives list. She was the only woman on the list at the time.

In the meantime, Pender had settled in a North Side Chicago neighborhood where she went under the name Ashley Thompson. She found a job as an estimator for a contractor.

On December 22, 2008, two hours after a rerun of the America's Most Wanted episode, her neighbor identified her and called the Chicago police, who arrested her at her apartment. She denied being Sarah Pender.

Pender was held in solitary confinement at the Indiana Women's Prison in Indianapolis from December 2008 to January 30, 2014, for a total of 1,870 days. She will be eligible for parole on April 4, 2054, at age 75. On January 25, 2018, Pender was transferred back to Rockville Correctional Facility.

== Current appeals ==
During the summer of 2013, Cara Wieneke, Pender's lawyer, filed a motion with the Marion County prosecutors office, requesting a deal that would free Pender. If granted, Pender would plead guilty to a class C felony of assisting a criminal, which carries a maximum prison sentence of 8 years. The request was based on the new evidence that had surfaced, such as Pennington's "snitch list." However, Marion County Prosecutor Terry Curry refused to sign off on a reduced sentence. Citing the new evidence, he explained that "If she believes this information justifies a new trial, then their remedy is to file a new post-conviction relief petition."

In October 2013, Wieneke filed a request for a new trial on Pender's behalf. The request was based on Pennington's snitch list, as well as a newly discovered second snitch list by Pennington, and the testimony from a forensic linguist. On February 17, 2014, the Indiana Court of Appeals denied the request explaining that the "petitioner has failed to establish a reasonable possibility that he is entitled to post-conviction relief." Controversy arose when information surfaced that a judge sitting on the reviewing panel was Cale J. Bradford. Bradford had been judge during both of Richard Hull's 2000 and 2005 appeals, raising questions about the court's impartiality in reviewing Pender's request.

A team out of Georgetown University's "Making an Exoneree" program is working to exonerate Pender, as of spring 2023.

== "Female Charles Manson" label ==
In 2002, during her trial, Marion County Deputy Prosecutor Larry Sells likened Pender to a "Female Charles Manson" to describe her alleged influence over Hull. This comparison was relayed by the media on several occasions, and it has regularly resurfaced since in the online media.

In 2009 and during his trial, Spitler explained that he had been manipulated by Pender. At the time of the escape, Indiana Department of Correction Commissioner Edwin Buss told the media that Pender had "manipulated him to the point where [he had planned his day] to get a vehicle inside the facility and take her outside the facility." Detectives said that she had first seduced, and then coerced, Spitler into helping her to escape. Interviewed by America's Most Wanted, Sells said (concerning Pender) that "Lurking within is a dark evil demon [...] she has the ability to seduce people into committing atrocious acts [...] she has a Charles Manson-like ability to manipulate people." The America's Most Wanted website made a particularly dramatic depiction of Pender, labeling her a "cunning and dangerous fugitive" and asking viewers to call "before she has the opportunity to kill again." It said that "Pender used her body to get what she desired most -- Freedom." The show also talked about "her manipulative ways." In a controversial book about Pender, journalist Steve Miller also compared her to an evil, supernatural being and wrote, "Vampires, as the lore has it, exist on the essence of others. Sarah Pender was a vampire in the emotional and mental sense."

Pender has written that "the media, including 'America's Most Wanted,' has selectively used facts in order to manipulate the viewers to believe I am a degenerate, dangerous criminal in return for sensational story and higher ratings under the guise of bringing justice." Supporters of Pender claim that Spitler was aware of the media's depiction of Pender and used it to minimize his responsibility. They point out that Spitler did not act out of a misguided love for a femme fatale when he helped Pender to escape Rockville Correctional Facility; rather, he was expecting a $15,000 payment for his services, a fact that the media did not report, neither during Pender's escape, nor before, during or after Spitler's trial. Pender's supporters further point out that the relationship between Pender and Spitler was not an exception at Rockville. Two months after her escape, in October 2008, Roger Heitzman, another correctional officer at Rockville, was arrested by the state police for trafficking and engaging in sex acts with at least one female inmate. Because the case was not high profile, no one claimed that Heitzman was a victim who was manipulated by the inmate involved. Supporters of Pender also claim that the Department of Corrections had an interest in exaggerating Pender's abilities in order to minimize the media damage and their own responsibilities. The Rockville Correctional Facility's hiring policy had already received bad media publicity in February 2008, when it was revealed that mass murderer Steven Kazmierczak had been hired there in 2007 to work as a correctional officer.

== Media ==
A book on her escape, Girl, Wanted: The Chase for Sarah Pender was released June 7, 2011. The book, written by Steve Miller, has been criticized as inaccurate and deliberately quoting key documents in a misleading way. Miller's investigation, however, brought to light Pennington's "snitch list." According to former prosecutor Sells, reading the book led him to reconsider his position on the fairness of Pender's 2002 trial.

In April 2011, a Mail-Art Project, "Send us YOUR Hand" was launched by Pender, her family and her friends under the organization "Art for Humanity" to raise support and help Pender, who had been in solitary confinement since 2008, so she could remain connected to the outside world.

On April 1, 2012, her case was profiled on an episode of the Oxygen TV series, Snapped. The TV show features interviews of Pender and her relatives, as well as those of many persons involved in the case.

Lifetime produced a movie based on the Pender case titled She Made Them Do It, starring Jenna Dewan. The movie sparked interest for the Pender case; the Wikipedia page about Pender was visited 100,000 times within three days following the movie's December 29, 2012, premiere on the Lifetime channel.

On September 22, 2013, the case was featured on the Investigation Discovery show, Deadline: Crime with Tamron Hall.

On September 26, 2013, Pender was interviewed on the British documentary, Women Behind Bars with Trevor McDonald.

On April 15, 2016, her case was on Investigation Discovery's show, A Stranger in My Home. Her episode is titled "Master Manipulators."

On February 19, 2026, Hulu/Disney+ released a 3 episode docuseries covering Pender's escape called Girl On The Run: The Hunt For America's Most Wanted Woman.
