= Murder of Shanda Sharer =

1992 child murder in Jefferson County, Indiana, US

- Victim Shanda Sharer c. November 1991
- Date: January 11, 1992
- Location: Shelby Township, Jefferson County, Indiana, U.S.; 38°53′56.7″N 85°19′10.2″W
- Type: Child-on-child murder and torture murder by immolation, stabbing, beating, ligature strangulation, sexual assault, kidnapping, arson
- Motive: Revenge against Sharer for dating Loveless' ex-girlfriend
- Deaths: Shanda Renée Sharer, aged 12
- Convicted: Melinda Loveless; Mary Laurine "Laurie" Tackett; Hope Anna Rippey; Toni Lawrence
- Verdict: All four pleaded guilty
- Convictions: Loveless, Tackett, Rippey: Murder, criminal confinement, arson; Lawrence: Criminal confinement
- Sentence: Loveless and Tackett: 60 years imprisonment (Loveless released after 26 years, Tackett released after 25 years); Rippey: 35 years imprisonment (released after 14 years); Lawrence: 20 years imprisonment (released after 9 years)

Shanda Renee Sharer (June 6, 1979 – January 11, 1992) was an American girl who, at the age of 12, was kidnapped from her father's home in Jeffersonville, Clark County, Indiana, and tortured before being burned to death in Shelby Township, Jefferson County, by four teenage girls. The crime attracted international attention due to both its brutality and the youth of the perpetrators; aged between 15 and 17 years old at the time of the murder, the perpetrators have all since been released from prison, each one having served less than half her original sentence. The case was covered by national news and talk shows and has inspired several episodes of crime fiction TV shows.

== Victim ==
Shanda Sharer was born in the Pineville Community Hospital in Pineville, Kentucky, on June 6, 1979, to Stephen and Jacqueline "Jacque" Sharer (later Vaught). After Shanda's parents divorced, her mother remarried and the family relocated to Louisville, Kentucky. There, Shanda attended fifth and sixth grades at St. Paul School, where she was on the cheerleading, volleyball, and softball teams. In June 1991, after her mother divorced again, the family relocated to New Albany, Indiana, and Shanda enrolled at Hazelwood Middle School. Early in the school year, she transferred to Our Lady of Perpetual Help School, a Catholic school in New Albany, where she joined the girls' basketball team.

== Perpetrators ==
=== Melinda Loveless ===
Melinda Loveless was born in New Albany, Indiana, on October 28, 1975, the youngest of three daughters to Marjorie and Larry Loveless. Larry was drafted into the U.S. Army during the Vietnam War, attaining the rank of Sergeant, and although allegedly harmed emotionally, he was treated as a hero upon his return. Marjorie later described him as a sexual deviant who would wear her and her daughters' underwear and makeup, was incapable of staying monogamous, and had a mixture of jealousy and fascination with seeing her have sex with other men and women. They lived in or near New Albany throughout Melinda's childhood.

Larry worked irregularly for the Southern Railway after his military service; his profession allowed him to work whenever most convenient for him. In 1965, Larry became a probationary officer with the New Albany Police Department, but was dismissed after eight months when he and his partner assaulted an African-American man whom Larry accused of a sexual relationship with his wife. In 1988, Larry briefly worked as a mail carrier, but quit after three months and did very little work, having brought most of his mail home to destroy it.

Marjorie had worked intermittently since 1974. When both parents were working, the family was comfortable financially and lived in the upper-middle-class suburb of Floyds Knobs, Indiana. But Larry, who was violent and abusive, did not usually share his income with the family and impulsively spent any money he earned on himself, usually purchasing firearms, motorcycles, and cars. He filed for bankruptcy in 1980. Extended family members often described the marriage as loveless, and the daughters as visiting their homes hungry, apparently not getting enough to eat.

The Loveless parents would often visit taverns in Louisville, where Larry would pretend to be a doctor or a dentist and introduce Marjorie as his girlfriend. He would also "share" her with some of his friends from work, which she found disgusting. During an orgy with another couple at their house, Marjorie tried to commit suicide, an act she would repeat several times throughout her daughters' childhoods. When Melinda was nine years old, Larry had Marjorie gang raped, after which she tried to drown herself. After that incident, she refused to have sex with him for a month until he raped her as their daughters overheard the event through a closed door. During the summer of 1986, after she would not let him go home with two women he met at a tavern, Larry beat Marjorie so severely that she was hospitalized; he was convicted of battery.

The extent of Larry's abuse of his daughters and other children is unclear. Various court testimonies claimed he fondled Melinda as an infant, molested Marjorie's 13-year-old sister early in the marriage, and molested the girls' cousin Teddy from age 10 to 14. Both older girls said he molested them, though Melinda did not claim that this ever happened to her. She slept in bed with him until he abandoned his family when she was 14 years old. In court, Teddy described an incident in which Larry tied up all three sisters in a garage and raped them in succession; however, the sisters did not confirm this account. Larry was verbally abusive to his daughters and fired a handgun in the direction of Melinda's older sister Michelle when she was seven, intentionally missing her. He would also embarrass his children by finding their underwear and smelling it in front of other family members.

For two years, beginning when Melinda was five, the family was very involved with the Graceland Baptist Church. Larry and Marjorie gave a full confession and renounced drinking and swinging while they were members. Larry became a baptist lay preacher, and Marjorie became the school nurse. The church later arranged for Melinda to be taken to a motel room with a 50-year-old man for a five-hour exorcism. Larry became a marriage counselor with the church and acquired a reputation for being too forward with women, eventually attempting to rape one of them. After that incident, the Loveless parents quit the church and returned to their former professions and drinking.

In November 1990, after Larry was caught spying on Melinda and a friend, Marjorie attacked him with a knife; he was sent to the hospital after he attempted to grab it. She then attempted suicide again, and her daughters telephoned the authorities. After this incident, Larry filed for divorce and relocated to Avon Park, Florida. Melinda felt bereft, especially when Larry remarried. He sent letters to her for a while, but eventually severed all contact with her. Larry was killed in a car crash in St. Louis, Missouri, on December 16, 1998.

=== Mary Laurine "Laurie" Tackett ===
Laurie Tackett was born in Madison, Indiana, on October 5, 1974. Her mother was a fundamentalist Pentecostal Christian, and her father was a factory worker with two felony convictions in the 1960s. Tackett claimed that she was molested at least twice as a child at ages 5 and 12. In May 1989, her mother discovered that Tackett was changing from a dress into jeans at school, and, after a confrontation that night, attempted to strangle her. Social workers became involved, and Tackett's parents agreed to unannounced visits to ensure that child abuse was not occurring. Tackett and her mother had periodic conflicts. At one point, her mother went to Hope Rippey's house after learning that Rippey's father had purchased a Ouija board for the girls. She demanded that the board be burnt and that the Rippeys' house be exorcised.

Tackett became increasingly rebellious after her 15th birthday and was also fascinated by the occult. She would often attempt to impress her friends by pretending to be possessed by the spirit of "Deanna the Vampire". Tackett began to engage in self-harm early in 1991 when she began dating a girl who was involved with the occult. Her parents discovered the self-harm and checked her into a hospital on March 19, 1991. She was prescribed an anti-depressant and released. Two days later, with her girlfriend and Toni Lawrence, Tackett cut her wrists deeply and was returned to the hospital. After treatment of her wounds, she was admitted to the hospital's psychiatric ward. Tackett was diagnosed with borderline personality disorder and confessed that she had experienced hallucinations since she was a young child. She was discharged on April 12. She quit high school in September 1991.

Tackett stayed in Louisville in October 1991 to live with various friends. There, she met Loveless; the two became friends in late November. In December, Tackett moved back to Madison on the premise that her father would buy her a car. She still spent most of her time in Louisville and New Albany, and by December, spent most of it with Loveless.

=== Hope Rippey ===
Hope Anna Rippey was born in Madison on June 9, 1976. Her father was an engineer at a power plant. Her parents divorced in February 1984, and she moved with her mother and siblings to Quincy, Michigan, for three years. She claimed that living with her family in Michigan was somewhat turbulent. Her parents resumed their relationship in Madison in 1987. She was reunited with friends Tackett and Toni Lawrence, whom she had known since childhood, although her parents saw Tackett as a bad influence. As with the other girls, Rippey began to self-harm at age 15.

=== Toni Lawrence ===
Toni Lawrence was born in Madison on February 14, 1976. Her father was a boilermaker. She was close friends with Rippey from childhood. She was abused by a relative at age 9 and raped by a teenage boy at age 14, although the police only issued an order for the boy to keep away from Lawrence. She began attending counseling after the incident, but did not continue. She became promiscuous, began to self-harm, and attempted suicide in eighth grade.

== Events prior to the murder ==
In 1990, 15-year-old Loveless began dating a 13-year-old named Amanda Heavrin. After Loveless's father left the family and her mother remarried, Loveless began behaving increasingly erratically. She got into fights at school and reported being depressed, resulting in her receiving professional counseling. In March 1991, Loveless came out to her mother as a lesbian (as her two older sisters had done). Her mother was initially furious but eventually accepted it. As the year progressed, Loveless's relationship with Heavrin deteriorated.

Heavrin met Shanda Sharer early in the fall semester at Hazelwood Middle School when Heavrin started a fight with Sharer; however, they became friends while in detention for the altercation and later exchanged romantic letters. Loveless immediately grew jealous of Heavrin and Sharer's close friendship. In early October 1991, Heavrin took Sharer as her date to a school dance, where Loveless found and confronted Sharer. Although Heavrin and Loveless never actually broke up, Loveless started dating an older girl.

After Heavrin and Sharer attended a festival together in late October, Loveless began to discuss killing Sharer and threatened her in public. Concerned about the effects of their daughter's relationship with Heavrin, Sharer's parents arranged for her to transfer to a Catholic school in late November. Heavrin later claimed she gave letters Loveless sent her containing death threats towards Sharer to a "youth prosecutor", but the youth prosecutor never did anything about it as far as she knew.

== Events of January 10–11, 1992 ==
=== Pre-abduction ===
On the night of January 10, 1992, Lawrence (age 15), Rippey (15), and Tackett (17) drove in Tackett's car from Madison to Loveless's house in New Albany. Rippey and Lawrence, while both friends of Tackett, had not previously met Loveless (16). Upon arrival, Lawrence, Rippey and Tackett borrowed some clothes from Loveless, who showed them a knife and spoke of an intention to scare Sharer with it. While Tackett, Rippey, and Lawrence had never met Sharer before that night, Tackett already knew of the plan to murder the 12-year-old girl. Loveless explained to Lawrence and Rippey that she disliked Sharer for being a "copycat" and for stealing her girlfriend.

Tackett let Rippey drive the four teenagers to Sharer's father's house in Jeffersonville—where the 12-year-old spent weekends—stopping at a McDonald's restaurant en route to ask for directions. They arrived at Sharer's house shortly before dark. Loveless instructed Rippey and Lawrence to go to the door and introduce themselves as friends of Heavrin. The 12-year-old answered the door, telling Rippey and Lawrence who she was when they asked for Shanda. Rippey and Lawrence asked Sharer to come with them to see Heavrin, who was waiting for them at "the Witch's Castle", or Mistletoe Falls, a ruined stone house located on an isolated hill overlooking the Ohio River. Sharer was reluctant to go out, told Rippey and Lawrence she had a party to attend, and suggested the teenagers come back around midnight, a few hours later. Loveless was angry at first, but Rippey and Lawrence assured Loveless about returning for Sharer later.

The four teenagers crossed the river to Louisville and attended a punk rock show by the band Sunspring at the Audubon Skate Park near Interstate 65. Lawrence and Rippey quickly lost interest in the music and went to the parking lot outside, where they engaged in sexual activities with two boys in Tackett's car. Eventually, the four teenage girls returned to Sharer's house. During the ride, Loveless said that she "[could not] wait to kill" Sharer, while also saying the knife would only be used to frighten the 12-year-old. When the teenagers arrived at Sharer's house at 12:30 a.m., Lawrence refused to retrieve Sharer, so Tackett went with Rippey to the door instead. Loveless hid under a blanket in the back seat of the car with the knife.

=== Abduction ===
Sharer's father and stepmother had gone to bed while the 12-year-old stayed downstairs to watch television. When Sharer opened the door to Rippey and Tackett, Rippey told Sharer that Heavrin was still at the Witch's Castle. Sharer was reluctant to go with them, yet agreed after changing her clothes. As they got in the car, Rippey began asking Sharer questions about her relationship with Heavrin. Loveless then sprang out from the back seat, held the knife to Sharer's throat, and began interrogating Sharer about her sexual relationship with Heavrin. They drove towards Utica and the Witch's Castle. Tackett told the other girls that a local legend said the house was once a castle owned by nine witches, and that the townspeople burned it down to get rid of the witches, leaving a small stone house in its place.

At the Witch's Castle, the kidnappers took a sobbing Sharer inside and bound her arms and legs with rope. There, Loveless taunted Sharer, saying Sharer had "pretty hair" and talking about cutting it, which frightened Sharer even more. Loveless began taking off Sharer's rings and handing them to the other teenagers. Rippey took Sharer's Mickey Mouse watch and danced to the tune it played. Tackett further taunted Sharer, claiming that the Witch's Castle was filled with human remains and saying Sharer's would be put there. To further threaten Sharer, Tackett then retrieved a shirt with a smiley design from the car and lit it on fire, but immediately feared that the fire would be spotted by passing cars, so the kidnappers took Sharer back inside the car and drove off.

During the car ride, Sharer continued begging her kidnappers to take her back home. Eventually, they became lost, so they stopped at a gas station and covered Sharer in a blanket. While Tackett went inside to ask for directions, Lawrence called a boy she knew in Louisville and chatted for several minutes to ease her worries, but did not mention Sharer's abduction. They returned to the car but got lost again and pulled into another gas station. There, Lawrence and Rippey spotted a couple of boys and talked to them before once again getting back into the car and leaving, arriving some time later at the edge of some woods near Tackett's home in Madison.

=== Torture ===
Tackett led the other girls to a dark abandoned building off a logging road in a densely forested area. Lawrence and Rippey were frightened and stayed in the car. Loveless and Tackett forced Sharer to strip down to her underwear before Loveless beat Sharer with her fists and repeatedly slammed Sharer's face into her knee, which cut Sharer's mouth on her own braces. Loveless attempted to slash Sharer's throat, but the knife was too dull. Rippey came out of the car to hold down Sharer, and Loveless and Tackett took turns stabbing Sharer in the chest. Loveless and Tackett then choked Sharer with a rope until she was unconscious, placed her in the trunk of the car, and told Rippey and Lawrence that Sharer was dead.

The teenagers drove to Tackett's nearby home and went inside to drink soda and clean themselves. When they heard Sharer screaming in the trunk, Tackett went out with a paring knife and stabbed Sharer several more times, coming back a few minutes later covered with blood. After washing, Tackett told the girls' futures with her "runestones". At 2:30 a.m., Tackett and Loveless left to go "country cruising", driving to the nearby town of Canaan with Sharer still in the trunk of the car, while Lawrence and Rippey stayed behind. During the ride, Sharer continued to make crying and gurgling noises, so Tackett stopped the car and beat the 12-year-old with a tire iron until she fell silent. Tackett, saying she felt Sharer's head caving in, told Loveless to "smell it". The two teenagers repeatedly stopped the car to sexually abuse Sharer with the tire iron during their joyride through the countryside.

Loveless and Tackett returned to Tackett's house just before daybreak to clean themselves again and woke up Rippey and Lawrence. Rippey asked about Sharer, and Tackett laughingly described the torture. The conversation woke up Tackett's mother, who was initially angry with her daughter for being out so late, but also offered to cook breakfast for the girls. Tackett declined, saying she needed to drive the other girls home. Tackett drove to the burn pile, where the teenagers opened the trunk to look at Sharer. Lawrence refused to look, while Rippey sprayed Sharer with Windex and taunted, "You're not looking so hot now, are you?"

=== Immolation ===
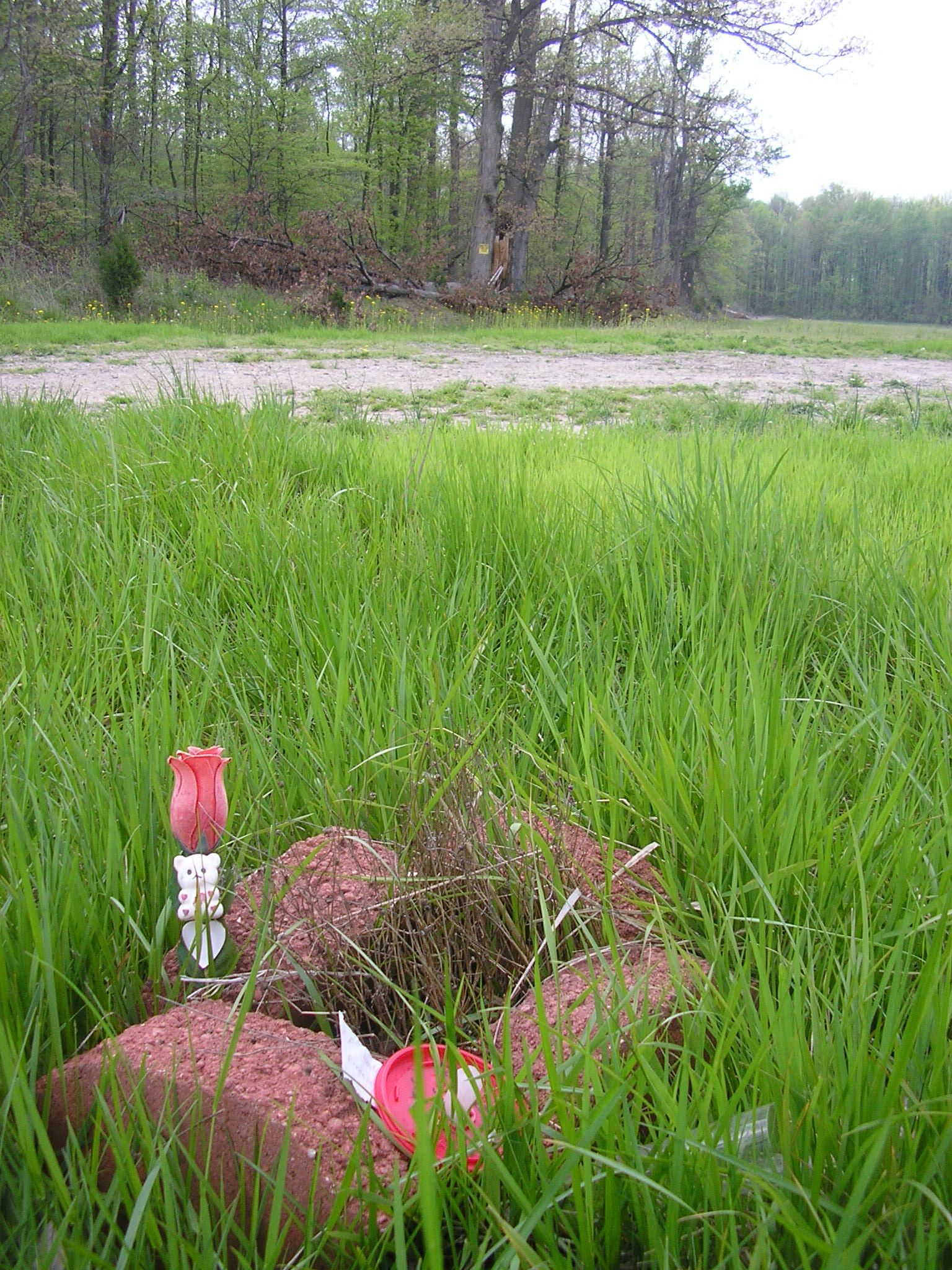
Memorial to Sharer at the location where she died.

The teenagers drove to a gas station near Madison Consolidated High School, pumped some gasoline into the car, and bought a two-liter bottle of Pepsi. Tackett emptied the bottle before refilling it with gasoline. They drove north of Madison, past Jefferson Proving Ground to Lemon Road off U.S. Route 421 in Shelby Township, a place known to Rippey. Lawrence remained in the car while Tackett and Rippey wrapped Sharer, who was still alive, in a blanket, and carried her to a field by the gravel country road. Rippey poured some of the gasoline on Sharer, and then they set the 12-year-old on fire. Loveless was not convinced Sharer was dead, so the teenagers returned a few minutes later to pour the rest of the gasoline on her.

The girls went to a McDonald's restaurant at 9:30 a.m. for breakfast, where they laughed about Sharer's badly burned body looking like one of the sausages they were eating. Lawrence then phoned a friend and told her about the murder. Tackett then dropped off Lawrence and Rippey at their homes and finally returned to her own home with Loveless. Loveless told Heavrin that they had killed Sharer and arranged to pick up Heavrin later that day with Tackett.

A friend of Loveless, Crystal Wathen, came over to Loveless's house, where Loveless and Tackett told Wathen what had happened. The three girls drove to pick up Heavrin and take her back to the Loveless home, where they told Heavrin the story. Both Heavrin and Wathen were reluctant to believe the story until Tackett showed them the trunk of the car with Sharer's bloody handprints and socks still present. Heavrin was horrified and asked to be taken home. When they pulled up in front of Heavrin's house, Loveless kissed Heavrin, told her she loved her and pleaded with her not to tell anyone. Heavrin promised she would not before entering her house.

== Investigation ==
Later on the morning of January 11, 1992, two brothers from Canaan, Donn and Ralph Foley, were driving toward Jefferson Proving Ground to go hunting when their attention was drawn to the side of the road. They initially thought a mannequin of some sort was lying there, but upon exiting the vehicle, they realized that it was the burned body of a child. They telephoned the police at 10:55 a.m. and were asked to return to the corpse. State trooper David Camm and Jefferson County Sheriff Buck Shipley and detectives began an investigation, collecting forensic evidence at the scene. They initially suspected a drug deal gone wrong and did not believe the crime had been committed by locals. The body was posed in a suggestive position, indicating this was done on purpose. The face and hands were burnt, indicating intent to render the body unrecognizable and unidentifiable. The arms were outstretched and the fists were clenched as a result of death by burning.

Sharer's father, Steven, noticed his daughter was nowhere to be found early on January 11. After telephoning neighbors and friends all morning, he called his ex-wife, Sharer's mother, at 1:45 p.m.; they met and filed a missing person report with the Clark County sheriff.

At 8:20 p.m., Lawrence and Rippey went to the Jefferson County Sheriff's office with their parents. They both gave very rambling statements, identifying the victim as "Shanda", naming the two other girls involved as best as they could, and describing the main events of the previous night. After an inter-county investigation, Shipley contacted the Clark County sheriff and was finally able to match the body to Sharer's missing person report.

Detectives obtained dental records that positively identified Sharer as the victim. Loveless and Tackett were arrested on January 12. The bulk of the evidence for the arrest warrant came from the statements of Lawrence and Rippey. The prosecution immediately declared its intention to try both Loveless and Tackett as adults. For several months, the prosecutors and defense attorneys did not release any information about the case, giving the news media only the statements by Lawrence and Rippey.

== Judicial process ==
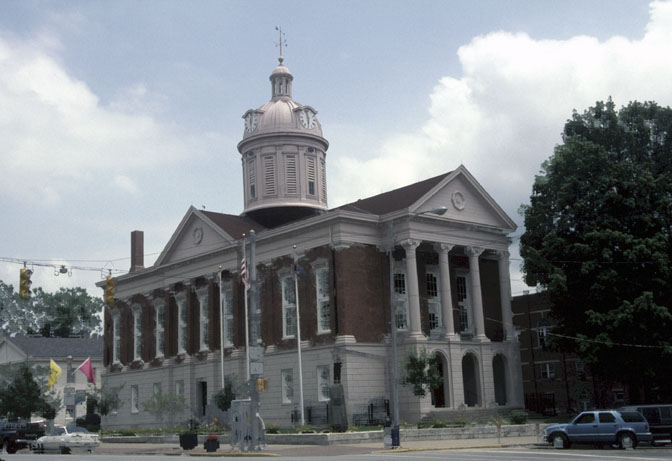
Jefferson County Courthouse in Madison, Indiana

Timeline
January 11, 1992	Body of Shanda Sharer found in rural Jefferson County, Indiana
April 22, 1992	Lawrence accepts plea bargain
September 21, 1992	Loveless and Tackett accept plea bargains
January 4, 1993	Loveless sentenced to 60 years
December 14, 2000	Lawrence released from prison
November 3, 2004	A judge reduces Rippey's 60-year sentence to 35 years
April 28, 2006	Rippey released from prison
January 11, 2018	Tackett released from prison
September 5, 2019	Loveless released from prison

All four girls were charged as adults. To avoid the death penalty, the girls accepted plea bargains.

=== Mitigating factors ===
Some of the girls allegedly had troubled home lives, with claims of physical or sexual abuse committed by a parent or other adult. Lawrence, Rippey, and Tackett all had histories of self-harm. Tackett was diagnosed with borderline personality disorder and suffering from hallucinations. Loveless, often described as the ringleader of the attack, had the most extensive history of abuse and mental health issues.

=== Sentences ===
Tackett and Loveless were sentenced to 60 years in the Indiana Women's Prison in Indianapolis. Tackett was released in January 2018, and served probation for one year. Loveless was released in September 2019. Rippey was sentenced to 60 years, with 10 years suspended for mitigating circumstances, plus 10 years of medium-supervision probation. On appeal, a judge reduced the sentence to 35 years. In exchange for her cooperation, Lawrence was allowed to plead guilty to one count of criminal confinement and was sentenced to a maximum of 20 years.

=== Appeals ===
Loveless appealed her sentence, but it was upheld by the Indiana Supreme Court in 1994.

In October 2007, Loveless's attorney, Mark Small, sought post-conviction relief from the Jefferson Circuit Court that originally sentenced her. He argued that Loveless had been "profoundly retarded" by childhood abuse. Moreover, she had not been represented competently by counsel during her sentencing, which caused her to accept a plea bargain in the face of exaggerated claims about her chances of receiving the death penalty. Small also argued that Loveless, who was 16 years old when she signed the plea agreement, was too young to enter into a contract in the state of Indiana without consent from a parent or guardian, which had not been obtained. If the judge accepted these arguments, Loveless could have been retried or released outright.

On January 8, 2008, Loveless's request was rejected by Jefferson Circuit Judge Ted Todd. Instead, Loveless would be eligible for release in 15 years, thus maintaining the original guilty plea. On November 14, 2008, Loveless's appeal was denied by the Indiana Court of Appeals, upholding Judge Todd's ruling. Small stated that he would seek to have jurisdiction over the case moved to the Indiana Supreme Court.

=== Releases ===
Lawrence was released on December 14, 2000, after serving nine years. She remained under supervision until December 2002.

On April 28, 2006, Rippey was released from the Indiana Women's Prison after serving fourteen years of her original sentence. She remained on supervised parole for five years until April 2011.

Tackett was released from Rockville Correctional Facility on January 11, 2018, the 26th anniversary of Sharer's death, after serving nearly 26 years, and completed an additional year of supervised release.

Loveless was released from Indiana Women's Prison on September 5, 2019. After serving more than 26 years in prison, she will serve her post-release supervision in Jefferson County, Kentucky.

== Aftermath ==
During Loveless's sentencing hearing, extensive open court testimony revealed that her father Larry had abused his wife, his daughters, and other children. Consequently, he was arrested in February 1993 on charges of rape, sodomy, and sexual battery. Most of the crimes occurred from 1968 to 1977. Larry remained in prison for over two years awaiting trial; however, a judge eventually ruled that all charges except one count of sexual battery had to be dropped due to the statute of limitations, which was five years in Indiana. Larry pleaded guilty to the one count of sexual battery. He received a sentence of time served and was released in June 1995. A few weeks following his release, Larry unsuccessfully sued the Floyd County Jail for $39 million in federal court, alleging he had suffered cruel and unusual punishment during his two-year incarceration. Among his complaints were that he was not allowed to sleep in his bed during the day or to read the newspaper.

Sharer's father, Steven Sharer, died of alcoholism in 2005 at the age of 53. In an interview with Shanda Sharer's mother, Jacque Vaught, on the Investigation Discovery series Deadly Women, Vaught stated that Sharer's father was so distraught by his daughter's murder that he "did everything he could to kill himself besides put a gun to his head" and that he "drank himself to death. The man definitely died from a broken heart".

The Shanda Sharer Scholarship Fund was established in January 2009. The fund planned to provide scholarships to two students per year from Prosser School of Technology in New Albany; one scholarship to a student who is continuing his or her education, and the other scholarship to a student who is beginning his or her career and must buy tools or other work equipment. By November 2018, Vaught stated that the scholarship fund had been depleted and was no longer accepting donations.

In 2012, Vaught made her first contact with Loveless since the trials, albeit indirectly. Vaught donated a dog named Angel in Shanda's name to Loveless to train for the Indiana Canine Assistance Network program (ICAN) through Project2heal, which provides service pets to people with disabilities. Loveless trained dogs for the program for several years. Vaught reported that she had endured criticism over the decision but defends it, saying, "It's my choice to make. [Shanda]'s my child. If you don't let good things come from bad things, nothing gets better. And I know what my child would want. My child would want this." Vaught stated that she hoped to donate a dog every year in honor of her daughter. A documentary produced by Episode 11 Productions, titled Charlie's Scars, captured Vaught's decision to allow Loveless to train dogs in Shanda's name. The film also has three interviews with Loveless.

== In popular culture ==
=== In literature and stage plays ===
The crime was documented in two true crime books, Little Lost Angel by Michael Quinlan and Cruel Sacrifice by Aphrodite Jones; Jones's book on the case became a New York Times Bestseller.

The story was adapted into a play by Rob Urbinati named Hazelwood Jr. High, which featured Chloë Sevigny as Tackett. The play was published by Samuel French, Inc. in September 2009.

The 2023 novel Penance by Eliza Clark, which is structured as a fictional true crime book, concerns a murder with details and characters based largely on Sharer's murder.

The poem In God's Arms by author Lacy Gray was dedicated to the family of Sharer. It was published on February 8, 1993, and May 11, 1995, in the Jeffersonville Evening News. The 2008 book kissing dead girls includes the Daphne Gottlieb poem The Whole World Is Singing, told from the point of view of Sharer and includes lines from notes written from Sharer to Heavrin.

=== In film ===
In the 2019 film The World Is Full of Secrets, teenage girls at a sleepover trade horror stories - all of which are nonfictional accounts of the murders of girls and young women. The third of these stories is an account of the murder of Sharer, though the participants are referred to by pseudonyms.

=== On television ===
"Mean", an episode from the fifth season of Law & Order: Special Victims Unit, is based on the murder.

The Cold Case second-season episode "The Sleepover" is loosely based on the crime.

In May 2011, Dr. Phil broadcast a two-part series concerning the crime, which featured Sharer's mother and sister confronting Rippey about her involvement in the murder and the appeal she made that led to her early release, and an interview with Heavrin.

The murder was covered in the first of two segments in the Lifetime series Killer Kids, episode "Jealousy", aired: July 2014.

The Investigation Discovery series The 1990s: The Deadliest Decade, episode "The New Girl" interviews Sharer's mother along with lead police officers, broadcast: November 2018.

Episode 3 of Mean Girl Murders (2024) is about the case.

=== In art ===
American artist Marlene McCarty used the murder as one of the subjects for her Murder Girls series of drawings about teenage female murderers, their sexuality and their relationships. McCarty's drawing titled Melinda Loveless, Toni Lawrence, Hope Rippey, Laurie Tackett, and Shanda Sharer – January 11, 1992 (1:39 am) (2000–2001) is now in the collection of the Museum of Contemporary Art, Los Angeles.

== See also ==
- Child murder
- List of kidnappings (1990–1999)
- List of solved missing person cases (1990s)
- Murder of Bobby Kent
- Murder of Michele Avila
- Murder of Skylar Neese
- Murder of Suzanne Capper
- Murder of Sylvia Likens
- Murder of Maryann Measles
- Parker–Hulme murder case
- Slender Man stabbing
