= Catalina Garcia =

Catalina Garcia may refer to:

- Catalina García, Colombian lead singer of Monsieur Periné
- Catalina Garcia (1988–2008), American murder victim at the Northern Illinois University shooting
