= Melissa S. May =

American judge in Indiana

Melissa S. May is the presiding judge of the 4th District of the Indiana Court of Appeals. She was appointed to the Court of Appeals by Indiana Governor Frank O'Bannon in 1998.

May has a bachelor's degree from Indiana University South Bend and a law degree from Indiana University Law School, Indianapolis.

== Sources ==
- Judicial bio of May
