= Richmond Hill explosion =

2012 explosion in Richmond Hill, Indianapolis, Indiana

- Date: November 10, 2012
- Time: 11:10 p.m. EST
- Location: Richmond Hill, Indianapolis, Indiana; 39.645226°N 86.097977°W
- Cause: Arson
- Participants: Mark Leonard; Bob Leonard; Monserrate Shirley; Gary Thompson; Glen Hults
- Deaths: 2
- Injuries: 7
- Property damage: US$ 4.4 million
- Convictions: M. Leonard: two x life plus 75 years without parole; B. Leonard: two x life without parole plus 70 years; Shirley: 50 years; Thompson: 30 years; Hults: 3 years
- Richmond Hill explosion (Indiana)

The Richmond Hill explosion took place on November 10, 2012, in the Richmond Hill subdivision in Indianapolis, Indiana, United States. The home of Monserrate Shirley was the center of the explosion that resulted in the deaths of next-door neighbors John "Dion" Longworth and his wife Jennifer (née Buxton), the injuries of seven others, and $4 million in property damage. Prosecutors alleged that the natural gas explosion was intentionally set to collect insurance money. Shirley, her boyfriend Mark Leonard, and three others were convicted and sentenced to prison on various charges, including felony murder for Leonard.

== Explosion ==
At about 11:10 p.m., on November 10, 2012, a large explosion occurred in Richmond Hill, a subdivision on the southeast side of Indianapolis. The explosion leveled 8349 Fieldfare Way, the home at the center of the explosion, and severely damaged a number of other residences, including several (on either side) which were damaged by the ensuing fire.

Dion and Jennifer Longworth, two occupants in the house at 8355 Fieldfare Way, died in the explosion; seven others were injured. Thirty-three homes were damaged beyond repair and had to be demolished. Over sixty firefighters responded to the blaze. Damage to homes in the neighborhood was estimated at $4 million.

Monserrate "Moncy" Shirley, a nurse, owned the home at the center of the explosion. She and her boyfriend, Mark Leonard, who also lived at the residence, told authorities they had left Friday night for a weekend at Hollywood Casino in Lawrenceburg, Indiana. They had arranged for Shirley's 12-year-old daughter to stay with friends and had boarded their cat, Snowball, for the weekend. Shirley told the police she never smelled any natural gas, but that her daughter had thought she did recently.

== Investigation ==
An investigation involving the Indianapolis Division of Homeland Security, the Indianapolis Metropolitan Police Department, the Bureau of Alcohol, Tobacco, Firearms and Explosives, and the Indianapolis Fire Department was begun. On November 19, it was announced that the investigation had become a criminal investigation. Authorities suspected foul play early on after learning Leonard had a history with insurance fraud.

Prosecutors alleged that on the Friday before the explosion, Leonard and his brother Bob spoke with a neighbor who worked for Citizens Energy, the main natural gas provider in Indianapolis. He asked that person about the differences between natural gas and propane. On the day of the explosion, another neighbor saw a white van pull into the driveway of Shirley's residence between 2:00 and 3:00 p.m. The men were reportedly in the home briefly and hurriedly left. Bob Leonard's son told investigators that several items were in the van that had been taken from the home, including photos and financial documents. Police became suspicious when they uncovered evidence that the couple had taken similar steps the previous weekend; the cat had been boarded and Shirley's daughter had been placed with a babysitter overnight before the couple went to the casino. Investigators said personal insurance on the home had recently been increased to $300,000.

The most damning piece of evidence was a witness statement from one of Mark Leonard's associates, who told investigators that the weekend before the explosion, Leonard told him that "the house blew up". He reportedly said, "[T]he tsunami winds came down the chimney, blew out the fire in the fireplace and the gas kept running and the house blew up." The witness also told investigators that Leonard talked about buying a Ferrari with the insurance money from the house.

Investigators discovered a number of allegations of insurance fraud and other scams by Leonard prior to the blast, particularly involving stolen or wrecked automobiles. Included on the probable cause affidavit were complaints from several women claiming that Leonard scammed them out of thousands of dollars. Many of the women reported that they met him on dating sites and that he soon began asking them for money. One woman had previously won a $70,000 judgment against Leonard in a civil suit after lending him $53,000, which he never repaid. Another woman reported that she had loaned him about $10,000 for a construction job, which he had yet to pay back.

== Charges ==
Monserrate Shirley, Mark Leonard, and Bob Leonard were initially charged with two counts of murder and arson in the deaths of Dion and Jennifer Longworth. Though the trio was eligible for the death penalty under Indiana law, prosecutors chose to pursue life sentences without parole because they believed a jury would be unlikely to impose the death penalty without any evidence that the suspects intended to cause the deaths. A fourth person, Gary Thompson, was charged in January 2015 on the same charges. In April 2015, a fifth man, Glenn Hults, was charged with conspiracy to commit arson. Hults and his then-fiancée babysat Shirley's daughter on the night of the explosion. Shirley alleged that Hults initially came up with the idea.

Prosecutors contended that the trio filled the house with natural gas and then used the spark from a microwave, which could be set in advance, to trigger the explosion. The alleged motive for the arson was to collect insurance money to ease financial strain. Shirley would receive over $300,000 in insurance money for the replacement of the home as well as personal items. Investigators found that the couple had substantial debt, including $63,000 in credit card debt, and were in bankruptcy proceedings. A friend of the couple reported that Mark Leonard had lost $10,000 at the casino approximately three weeks before the explosion. A second mortgage had been taken out on the home for $65,000 in addition to the original mortgage of $116,000.

Prosecutors initially sought to try the suspects together, but the defendants were granted the right to separate trials. Prosecutors then proposed an unusual strategy involving one trial, but three separate juries, one for each defendant. This type of trial is unusual but not unheard of, and had been used in the trial of the Menéndez brothers. Judge Shelia Carlisle rejected the proposal, noting that no Indiana law authorizes the use of concurrent jury trials. The trials started in 2015. The defendants requested that the trials be moved over concerns they would not receive a fair trial in Central Indiana due to the high-profile media coverage received by the case. Mark Leonard was granted a change of venue and was tried in South Bend.

On January 16, 2015, Shirley agreed to a plea deal with prosecutors. The plea deal involved Shirley pleading guilty to two counts of conspiracy to commit arson in exchange for testifying against the other suspects. Shirley admitted raising the limit on her insurance coverage at Mark Leonard's urging, and only went along with the plot out of love for him. She claimed to have been horrified at the Longworths' deaths, as well as the massive destruction wrought by the explosion.

== Conspiracy to commit murder ==
On March 28, 2015, Mark Leonard was charged with conspiring to murder the key witness against him, Mark Duckworth. Leonard allegedly asked another inmate at the Marion County jail if he could put him in contact with a hitman, according to the probable cause affidavit. The inmate and Leonard drew up a contract agreeing that Leonard would pay the inmate $15,000 when he was released, the affidavit said. On March 13, Leonard allegedly placed a call to a man who he believed to be a hit man. The man he called was actually an undercover agent. Prosecutors also allege that he offered the hit man a $5,000 bonus if he made the murder look like a suicide. They claim that Leonard wanted the hit man to force the witness to call 9-1-1 and recant his statement before killing him.

== Trials ==
Mark Leonard's trial began in June 2015. His defense team admitted that the blaze had been intentionally set, but told jurors it was only intended to be a small fire and that murder was never his intention. The defense said that what became the Richmond Hill explosion was only supposed to be a "stupid and selfish insurance fraud that went horribly wrong", adding, "Precautions were taken to ensure people weren't harmed." The case was expected to be the largest and most expensive trial in Marion County history. Prosecutors expected to submit nearly 3,000 pieces of evidence, and potentially call up to 175 witnesses.

Mark Leonard was found guilty on all 53 counts, including murder and felony murder charges, on July 14. He was sentenced to two consecutive life sentences plus 75 years without parole on August 14, 2015. He died on January 30, 2018, at an Indianapolis hospital, aged 48, of natural causes. Bob Leonard was convicted on all 51 counts, including murder and conspiracy to commit arson, on February 24, 2016. He was sentenced to two life sentences without parole, as well as 70 years from other charges, on March 18, 2016.

Monserrate Shirley pled guilty to conspiracy to commit arson. Her attorneys argued that she was trapped in an abusive relationship and was coerced by Mark Leonard into participating in the crime. Psychologist Dr. Stephanie Callaway diagnosed her with dependent personality disorder, but stated under cross-examination that, while the diagnosis explains Shirley's actions, it does not absolve her of responsibility. Shirley was sentenced to 50 years in prison, the maximum possible under her plea agreement, on December 20, 2016. She is serving her sentence at Indiana Women's Prison in Indianapolis. Her earliest possible release date is December 19, 2037, when she will be 72 years old.

Gary Thompson pled guilty to conspiracy to commit arson and was sentenced to 30 years in prison. Glenn Hults received a three-year sentence.
