= Mary Coffin Johnson =

American activist and writer

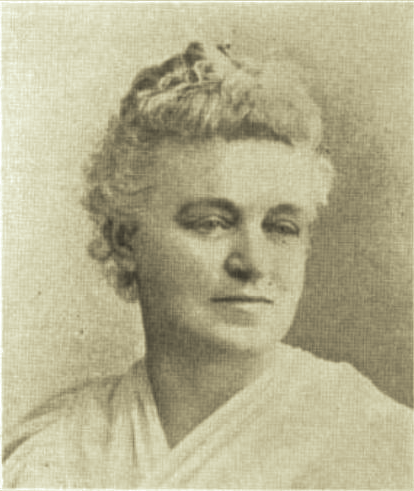
- Born: Mary Carol Coffin; July 15, 1834; Cincinnati, Ohio, U.S.
- Died: August 10, 1928 (aged 94); Manhattan, New York City, New York, U.S.
- Education: Earlham College
- Occupations: temperance activist; publisher; writer
- Spouse: Eli Johnson (m. 1858)
- Relatives: Rhoda Coffin (sister-in-law)

Mary Coffin Johnson (née, Coffin; July 15, 1834 – August 10, 1928) was an American temperance activist and writer. She was the publisher of the National Woman's Christian Temperance Union's (WCTU) first newspaper, The Union Signal. Johnson was acquainted with Abraham Lincoln, and was a friend of Henry Ward Beecher and his wife Eunice.

== Early life and education ==
Mary Carol Coffin was born in Cincinnati, Ohio, July 15, 1834. Her parents, Elijah (a banker) and Naomi Coffin, were Quakers. Rhoda Coffin was a sister-in-law.

She was educated at the Friends’ School, Cincinnati, and at Earlham College, Richmond, Indiana.

== Career ==
At the age of 17, on March 31, 1858, she married Eli Johnson (d. 1891), of Virginia.

At the age of 19, Johnson had been one of a board of managers of a large philanthropic work in Cincinnati. Her leaning toward this humanitarian work, she said, was the heritage from her Quaker parents, especially her mother.

In 1873, she moved to Brooklyn, New York.

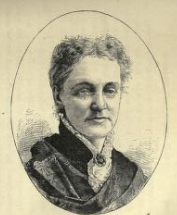
(1878)

Early in life she became interested in the temperance reform, and she took an active part in the formation of the Brooklyn WCTU, serving as president of the organization for nine years, and also of the National WCTU, of which she served as a member of the first executive committee (1874) and as secretary. Her activities in Brooklyn included holding prayer-meetings throughout the city, visiting the saloons and appealing to the saloon-keepers, as well as distributing literature. She also was a leader in the campaign waged by the Union which secured the closing of the 3,000 saloons in that city on Sunday, on the strength of an obsolete statute which had been revived by the temperance women. She addressed temperance meetings in Brooklyn, Ossining, Round lance, New York, at Orchard Beach and Lake Sebago, Maine, at Ocean Grove, New Jersey, and elsewhere, and in churches in many of the Eastern cities.

She was also one of the founders of the Union, the first temperance paper published by the WCTU (renamed, The Union Signal), and was its first publisher and for several years a member of the editorial committee.

In 1876, Johnson went to England where she held drawing-room temperance meetings, addressing 150 such gatherings during the year. In 1879, she again toured England, also extending her work to North Ireland. She was the first American woman to go abroad in temperance work, and owing to her success, she in 1879, resigned her office in the National WCTU, to continue her endeavors in the foreign field.

Johnson took an active part in the formation of WCTU organizations in various States. She was also a member of the first committee of the National WCTU to approach Congress on the subject of temperance, serving as recording secretary, the other members being Annie Turner Wittenmyer and Frances E. Willard. During her stay in Washington, she visited Lucy Webb Hayes, wife of President Rutherford B. Hayes and an oid friend of hers, and induced her to attend some meetings of the Union in that city and to take a permanent interest in the work of the organization. She made the acquaintance of Willard when the latter visited New York City, before she had decided to take up the work of temperance reform; and under her guidance, Willard visited the poorer parts of the city, where she learned at first hand the need of temperance work. In her book Glimpses of Fifty Years, Willard said of Mrs. Johnson that she was one of "the first persons who befriended and advised me in the unknown field of Gospel Temperance".

Beside her temperance work, Johnson was active in social and philanthropic work: she was one of the founders of the Woman's Press Club of New York City (charter member and honorary vice-president), and one of the founders of the "Daughters of Ohio in New York" (1901) . She was also a member of Sorosis, the oldest club in the country. For decades, she was an executive member of the State board of the New York State Home Mission Union. In religion, she affiliated with the Plymouth Church of that city. Out of her work for the WCTU sprang the Wayside Home for Women who were just out of prisons, which Johnson organized about 1887.

In June 1912, she attended the General Federation of Women's Clubs convention in San Francisco, California.

== Death ==
Johnson broke her leg after falling in her home, and died three months later at the Harbor Sanitarium, Manhattan, August 10, 1928.

== Selected works ==
- Gospel Temperance Songs (with Eli Johnson)
- The Higleys and their ancestry. An old colonial family, 1892
- Genealogical studies, 1895
- Biographical sketches of the Rambos of America, 1914
- M. Morris White, 1830–1913, 1917
- Charles F. Coffin, a Quaker pioneer, 1923
