= Murder of Ruth Pelke =

1985 crime in Indiana, US

- Location: Gary, Indiana, U.S.
- Date: May 14, 1985; 41 years ago
- Attack type: Robbery, homicide by stabbing, torture
- Victims: Ruth Pelke, aged 78
- Perpetrators: Paula R. Cooper, 15; Karen Corder, 16; Denise Thomas, 14 (accomplice); April Beverly, 15 (accomplice)
- Convictions: Murder; Robbery
- Sentence: Cooper; Death; commuted to 60 years imprisonment Corder; 60 years imprisonment Thomas; 35 years imprisonment Beverly; 25 years imprisonment

Ruth Pelke was a 78-year-old American living in Gary, Indiana, who was stabbed to death by Paula R. Cooper (August 25, 1969 – May 26, 2015), then aged 15, on May 14, 1985. Cooper stabbed Pelke 33 times with a butcher knife before stealing ten dollars and her car. A year later, Cooper was sentenced to death on July 11, 1986.

Cooper's age and sentence attracted an international uproar, including a condemnation from Pope John Paul II. In 1989, her sentence was commuted to 60 years in prison. On June 17, 2013, slightly less than 27 years after her initial sentencing, Cooper was released from Rockville Correctional Facility. She died on May 26, 2015, at the age of 45, following an apparent suicide.

== Background ==
According to police, Cooper skipped school with three friends (Denise Thomas, aged 14; Karen Corder, aged 16; and April Beverly, aged 15), drank alcohol, and smoked marijuana before visiting Pelke, a neighbor, ostensibly to ask about Bible lessons. One of the girls struck Pelke with a vase, and cut her arms and legs. Cooper stabbed Pelke 33 times in the chest and stomach with a foot-long (30 cm) butcher knife, while Thomas cried and begged her to stop. Corder initially told Cooper to stop, but later held the knife in place and at one point twisted it while demanding Pelke to reveal where she had hidden her valuables. Cooper and her friends then searched the house for jewelry, and stole ten dollars and the keys to Pelke's 1976 Plymouth.

Cooper's lawyers described her as a victim of abuse who had attended ten different schools by the time of the murder. She had a prior record as a runaway and for burglary. However, there was no question of her guilt in the case. She was considered to be the ringleader of the group of girls. According to authorities, Cooper attacked guards in the juvenile center after her arrest and had to be moved to the County Jail. There, it was reported that she bragged about her crime and had said she would do it again.

== Sentencing and fallout ==
The prosecution initially sought death sentences for all four defendants, but later reversed course and only sought death sentences for Cooper and Corder. Thomas, who was present but did not participate in the murder, was convicted of felony murder at trial and sentenced to 35 years in prison. After agreeing to testify against her codefendants, Beverly, who had waited outside as a lookout, pleaded guilty to robbery and received a 25-year sentence. In a bid for leniency, Corder and Cooper both pleaded guilty at the advice of their public defenders. Corder received a 60-year sentence after the court found that she had been ''under the extreme domination'' of Cooper.

At sentencing, Lake County deputy prosecutor James McNew portrayed Cooper as a social misfit with no hope of rehabilitation and asked for the death penalty. The defense presented evidence that Cooper was a chronic runaway who had been physically abused and forced to watch the rape of her mother and violent assaults by her father. The defense stated that Cooper's mother had once attempted to kill her. Cooper was found guilty, and Judge James Kimbrough imposed the death penalty. She was the youngest person sentenced to death in the history of Indiana. Indiana had executed only three juvenile offenders in its history. All of them were 17 at the time of their crimes. The last of the three to be executed was 18-year-old William Ray in 1920. Ray was executed for raping and murdering a 14-year-old girl less than three months before his 18th birthday.

Cooper was sent to death row at Indiana Women's Prison in Indianapolis. Her case was taken up by attorney Monica Foster, who organized a campaign which presented an appeal signed by two million people to the Indiana Supreme Court. Pope John Paul II made a personal appeal to Indiana Governor Robert Orr in September 1987. A separate appeal to the United Nations received one million signatures.

Cooper's case was profiled on 60 Minutes. She was front-page news in her hometown of Gary, including a scandal where it was found that several prison guards had sex with her in her cell, and pregnancy tests were performed, which came back negative. Judge Kimbrough died, and the appeals process was slowed as a replacement was chosen. In 1987, the Indiana legislature passed a bill raising the minimum execution age from 10 to 16. The change was a reaction to Cooper's case, but the legislature made it clear that the change did not affect Cooper's death sentence. In 1988, a U.S. Supreme Court decision, Thompson v. Oklahoma, barred the death penalty for defendants under the age of 16 at the time of the crime. The Indiana Supreme Court considered both of these developments, and the court heard arguments and reduced Cooper's sentence to 60 years imprisonment on July 3, 1989. In its ruling, Cooper's attorneys noted that not only had Indiana not executed any juvenile offenders in nearly 70 years, only two other juvenile offenders had been sentenced to death in the state since the 1970s. Jay Thompson and Keith Patton, who were both sentenced to death for murders committed when they were 17, had since had their death sentences reversed.

A New York Times editorial that month called the court's decision "brave" and said that the law on which her death sentence was based was "medieval" as it allowed the execution of children as young as 10.

== Aftermath ==
Under Indiana law at the time, convicts automatically had their sentences halved, provided that they maintained good conduct. April Beverly was released from prison on April 10, 1999. A year after her release, she was murdered by her abusive boyfriend in Gary, Indiana. Denise Thomas was released from prison on August 25, 2003. Karen Corder died in prison from asthma and heart disease on December 30, 2008, at age 40. Cooper earned a GED and took college correspondence courses while in prison. She was released from Rockville Correctional Facility on June 17, 2013, and committed suicide on May 26, 2015, evidently out of remorse. Shortly before her suicide, Cooper wrote to her fiancé, "I have taken a life and never felt worthy."

Pelke's grandson, Bill Pelke, initially favored the death penalty for Cooper but later joined the movement opposing it in 1987. He wrote of having forgiven Cooper in a 2003 book, Journey of Hope.

The murder of Ruth Pelke and the case of Paula Cooper are the subject of the 2016 IndyStar story The Executioner Within and Alex Mar's 2023 book Seventy Times Seven.

== See also ==
- Capital punishment for juveniles in the United States
