= Indiana Women's Prison =

Prison in Indiana, United States

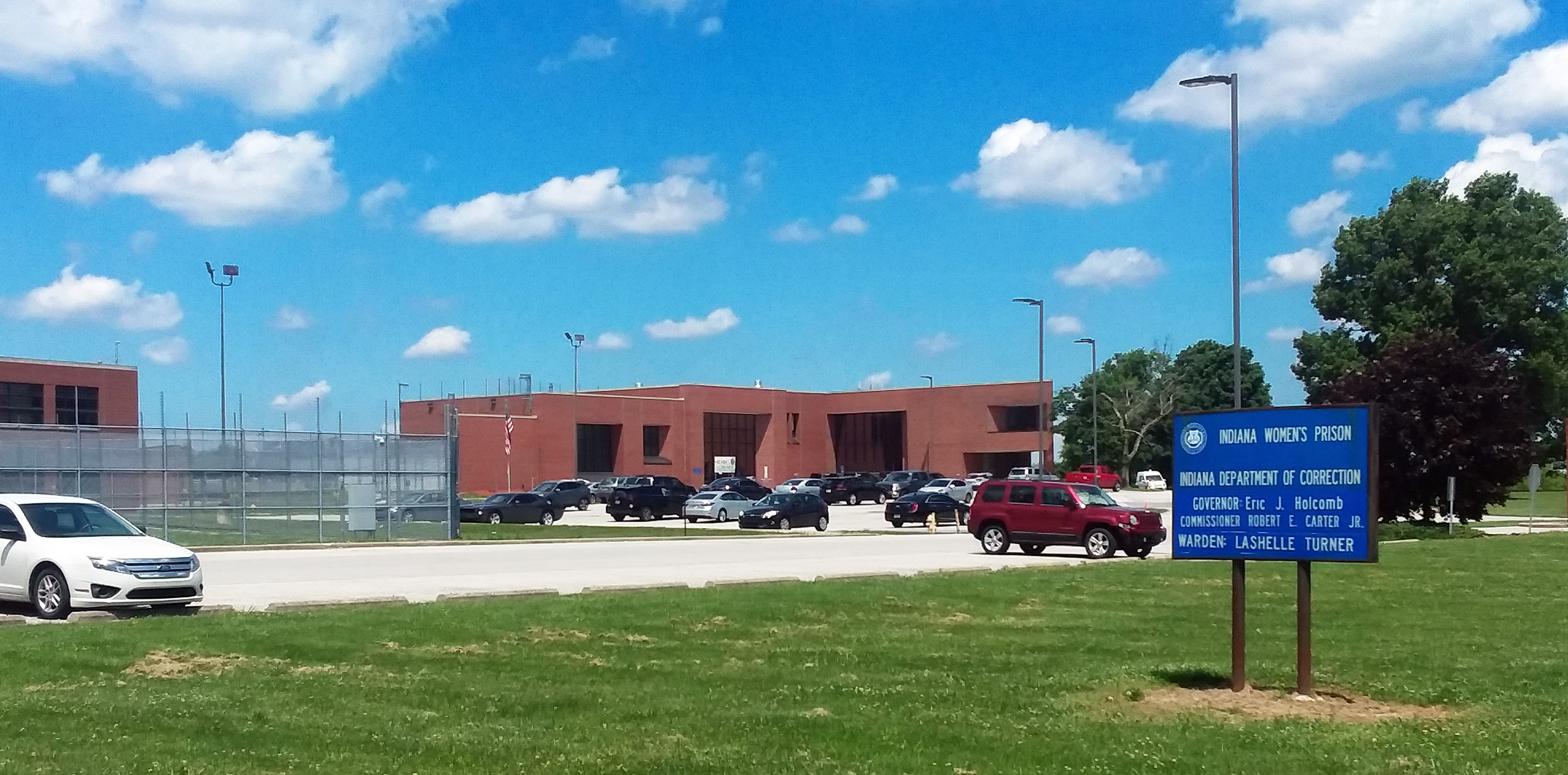
- Interactive map of Indiana Women's Prison
- Location: 2596 Girls School Road Indianapolis, Indiana; 39°48′03.4″N 86°17′24.5″W
- Status: open
- Security class: mixed
- Opened: 1873
- Managed by: Indiana Department of Corrections

The Indiana Women's Prison was established in 1873 as the first adult female correctional facility in the country. The original location of the prison was one mile (1.6 km) east of downtown Indianapolis. It has since moved to 2596 Girls School Road, former location of the Indianapolis Juvenile Correctional Facility. As of 2005, it had an average daily population of 420 inmates, most of whom are members of special-needs populations, such as geriatric, mentally ill, pregnant, and juveniles sentenced as adults. By the end of 2015, the population increased to 599 inmates. Security levels range from medium to maximum. The prison holds Indiana's only death row for women; however, it currently has no death row inmates. The one woman under an Indiana death sentence, Debra Denise Brown, had her sentence commuted to 140 years imprisonment in 2018 and is being held in Ohio.

== Early history ==
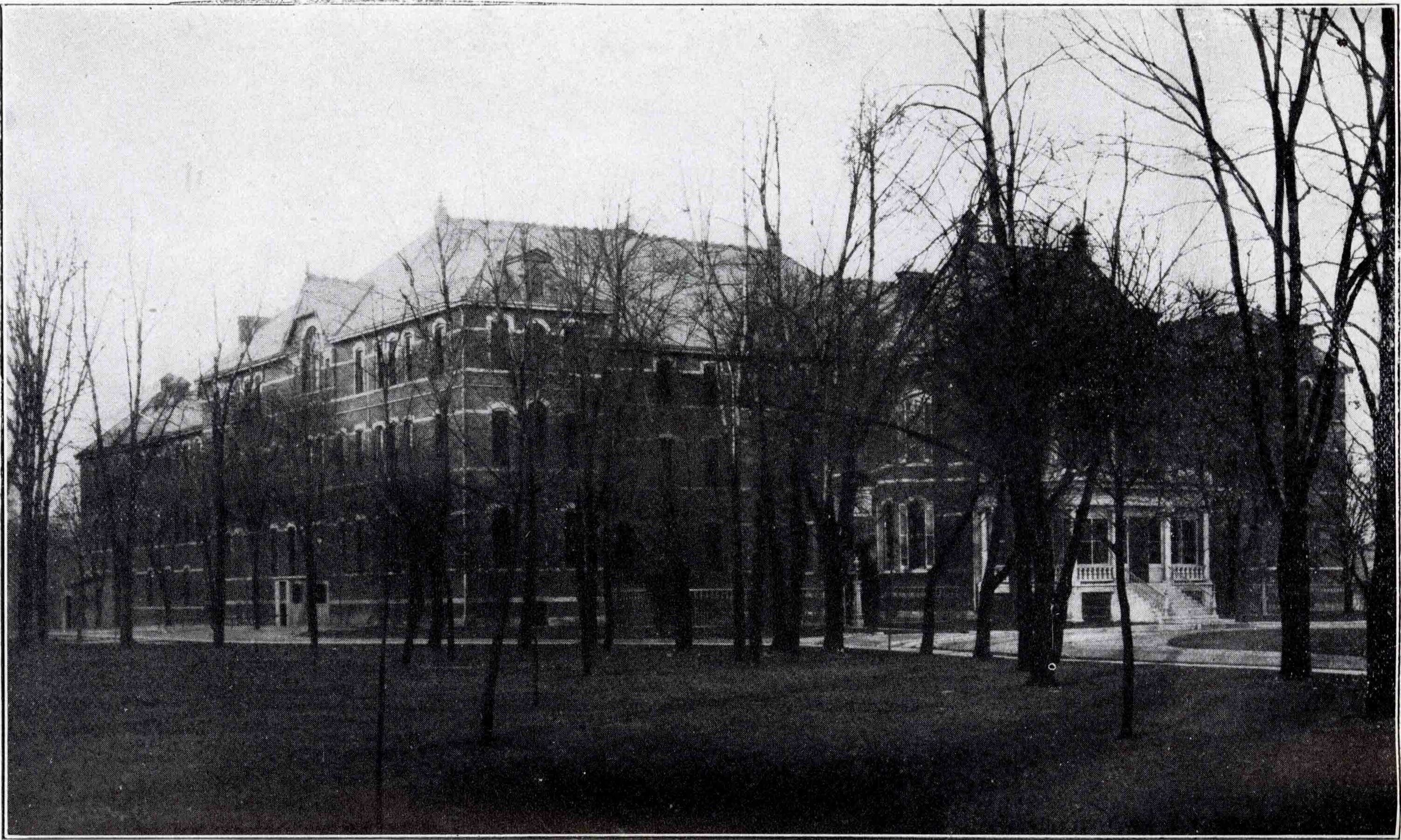
Indiana Women's Prison in 1911.

Established in 1873, the Indiana Women's Prison was not only the United States' first separate institution for female prisoners, but was also the first maximum-security female correctional facility in the nation. Formerly, female felons had been detained at the Indiana State Prison, located first in Jeffersonville and later in Clarksville. When Quaker prison reformers Rhoda Coffin and Sarah J. Smith learned of the abuses suffered by women prisoners at the hands of the male guards, they lobbied for an end to sexual abuse of women in state prisons. Soon after, Ellen Cheney Johnson facilitated the opening of the Dedham Asylum for Discharged Female Prisoners in Massachusetts. In 1869, their bill for a "Female Prison and Reformatory Institution for Girls and Women" passed the state legislature and served as a precedent to prison reformers across the country.

Sarah J. Smith, a minister, former Civil War nurse, and matron of Indiana's Home for the Friendless in Richmond, was the first superintendent of the Indiana Women's Prison, as well as the first female superintendent of any prison – male or female – in the United States. As superintendent, she "relied on traditional methods of discipline" in addition to teaching inmates "some remunerative skills so that they would not be tempted to commit crimes after their release." Mainly, the women worked on laundry, sewing, and knitting, though some did industrial work. Rewards for good merit included working outdoors in the chicken farm or gardens, painting the rooms, and performing other small renovations.

At the opening of the institution, the first inmate to be admitted was Sallie Hubbard, convicted for the murder of seven people. Hubbard was transferred from the Jeffersonville State Prison, where she had already served seventeen years of her sentence. At the end of its first year, sixteen offenders were held in the Women's Prison; however, the number of inmates quickly increased. According to the Handbook of American Prisons, published in 1929, 197 women were incarcerated on September 30, 1928. The Handbook noted that the women could benefit from increased organization in prison activities to provide a "wholesome experience in the duties and responsibilities of social living."

== Mid-20th century ==
In 1968, Dana Blank became the assistant superintendent at the Indiana Women's Prison. Prior to this, the population of female offenders had dropped to around 88, and there were no treatment programs available to the women. When Blank became superintendent in 1990, however, she began to change the culture of the prison to one that looks at each woman holistically. Because of the extremely high abuse rate among incarcerated women, Blank created a safe and nurturing environment for the women in addition to beginning the prison's visitation program and summer camp in order to promote mother-child bonding.

Since 1900, the state of Indiana has sentenced to death four women, none of whom were ever executed. The most famous of them was Paula Cooper (#864800), a 15-year-old juvenile sentenced to death on July 11, 1986, for her role in the grisly murder of an elderly neighbor. While her death sentence was commuted in 1989, Cooper's sentence caused international uproar because of her youth, and even Pope John Paul II intervened on her behalf. While in prison, she continued to make headlines: a bill that raised Indiana's age of execution for murder from 10 to 16 came directly from Paula Cooper's case, as did a bill that made it illegal for jail employees to have sex with inmates after two guards and a recreational therapist were charged with having sex with Cooper while she was in jail awaiting sentencing.

== Demographics ==
According to data released on September 7, 2006, by the Indiana Department of Corrections, of the prison's 430 inmates, 272 were white, 145 black, 9 Hispanic, 2 American Indian, and 2 Asian/Pacific. Compared to the percentages of white and black inmates of the state's adult male facilities, the Indiana Women's Prison has a higher percentage of whites incarcerated (63% to 55%) and a lower percentage of blacks incarcerated (34% to 37%). Rockville Correctional Facility, Indiana's other female prison, has similar percentages: 64% of inmates are white, 32% black. Despite having whites account for nearly two-thirds of the inmates, white prison employees make up only 52% of the 165-member staff. Black staff members account for 45%, which is the highest percentage of black staff in the state. In a state where almost half the inmates are black, whites constitute 83% of prison employees while black staff members account for 14% of the DOC's 6,245 employees.

== Notable inmates ==
Clara Green Gibson Carl was convicted in June 1922 of second-degree murder in the poisoning death of her second husband, Frank Carl. She was given a life sentence, her time to be served at the Indiana Women's Prison. She did not, however, serve out her sentence. In May 1937, she was paroled.

Paula R. Cooper was sentenced to death for the murder of Ruth Pelke. Paula, who was 15 at the time of the crime, was later resentenced to life in prison and was transferred to the Rockville Correctional Facility from which she was released on June 17, 2013. She committed suicide on May 26, 2015.

Sarah Jo Pender was in solitary confinement at the Indiana Women's Prison from December 2008 to January 2013, following her escape from the Rockville Correctional Facility.

Melinda Loveless, Laurie Tackett and Hope Rippey, three of four teenage girls involved in the murder of 12-year-old Shanda Sharer in 1992, were also housed in this prison. Rippey was paroled on April 28, 2006, Tackett was paroled from the prison on the 26th anniversary of Shanda's death, and Loveless was paroled in September 2019.

Gertrude Baniszewski was an American murderer who, with the aid of most of her own children and neighborhood children, oversaw and facilitated the prolonged torture, mutilation, and eventual murder of 16-year-old Sylvia Likens, a teenage girl she had taken into her home. When she was convicted of first-degree murder in 1966, the case was called the "single worst crime perpetrated against an individual in Indiana's history".

Montserrate Shirley is an American murderer and insurance fraudster who perpetrated the November 10, 2012 Richmond Hill housing addition insurance fraud scheme explosion, which killed her two neighbors, Dion and Jennifer Longworth, and did over $4 million worth of damage to 80 surrounding homes in the neighborhood. As of 2019, 11 houses that were demolished still have not been rebuilt.

Brandi Worley is an American murderer who murdered her two children in 2016.
