= Rhoda Coffin =

American social reformer (1826–1909)

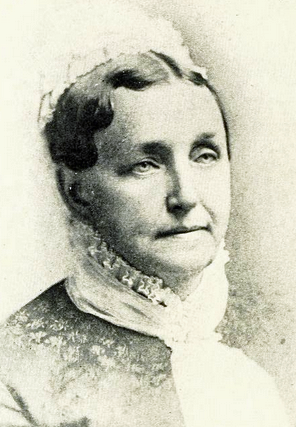
- Portrait of Rhoda Coffin
- Birthdate: February 1, 1826
- Birthplace: Greene County, Ohio
- Death: September 28, 1909
- Chicago, Illinois

Rhoda Coffin (1826–1909), was a Quaker social reformer, author, temperance crusader, and women's rights advocate who is best known for her efforts in prison reform. She held an integral role in establishing the Indiana Reformatory Institution for Women and Girls in 1869. It became the first female-controlled women's prison in the United States. She also served as president of the reformatory's board of managers. Coffin's efforts on behalf of prison reform made her a leading figure in the national prison reform movement, and she traveled widely, wrote articles, and delivered speeches on the topic. She was also a champion of other causes that assisted women and children.

Coffin's charitable work began in the 1850s, when she and her husband, Charles Coffin, began visiting homes and distributing bibles in Richmond, Indiana, where they resided. In partnership with her husband, she established the Marion Street Sabbath School in 1864, and with other local women, the Home Mission Association in 1866. Under her leadership as president, the mission association established a Home for Friendless Women in Richmond in 1868. Following her success as a women's prison reformer in the 1870s, Coffin joined the temperance crusade. With other women she established a local chapter of the Woman's Christian Temperance Union (WCTU) in 1874. Coffin's interest in social reform also led to her assistance in securing the appointment of the first female physician for the Indiana Hospital for the Insane in 1880. A bank scandal involving Coffin's husband and sons forced a move to Chicago, Illinois, in 1884. For the remaining twenty-five years of her life, Coffin resided in Chicago, where she continued to write and speak on prison reform and visited area prisons and insane asylums with her husband.

== Early life and family ==
Rhoda Moorman Johnson, the fourth child of Judith and John Johnson, was born on February 1, 1826, near Paintersville in Greene County, Ohio. She grew up in a strict, Orthodox Quaker farm family. In 1845, her parents agreed that she could enroll at the Whitewater Monthly Meeting School in Richmond, the seat of government for Wayne County, Indiana, but she returned home in 1846 to help the family after her father became ill.

Johnson met her husband, Charles Coffin (1823–1916), while attending school in Richmond. (Note: The eastern Indiana town was the headquarters for the Indiana Yearly Meeting, the country's largest Quaker organization.) Charles was the son of Elijah Coffin, the clerk (presiding officer) of the Indiana Yearly Meeting and a prominent Richmond banker. Rhoda and Charles Coffin married in 1847 and established their home in Richmond, where Charles succeeded his father as clerk of the Indiana Yearly Meeting in 1858 and became president of the Richmond National Bank in 1859. The Coffins became the parents of six children. As members of a prominent, upper-class Quaker family, they socialized with well-to-do families of Richmond and Indianapolis, Indiana.

== Career ==
=== Early years ===
Rhoda and Charles Coffin became involved in charitable activities in the 1850s, when they began traveling to homes in Richmond to distribute bibles in conjunction with the work of the American Bible Society. They also became leaders in the Benevolent Society of Richmond, which was founded in 1858 to provide assistance to the poor. The Coffins's work further expanded in 1860 when they asked permission to form a youth prayer event at the Indiana Yearly Meeting's annual gathering. The successful event, which attracted 2,000 participants, lead to their establishing a weekly prayer group at their home and marked the beginning of Rhoda's philanthropic career.

As a benevolent, Christian reformer, Coffin believed it was her mission to assist those in the lower socio-economic classes. Although her charitable activities were largely in tandem with her husband's efforts, she also worked with other women on reform projects. In 1864 the Coffins successfully established Marion Street Sabbath School in Richmond and served as the school's co-superintendents. By its first anniversary in May 1865, the school's enrollment had grown from 30 to 250 students. In 1866 Coffin and other Quaker women established a Home Mission Association in Richmond. Under her leadership as president, the association's activities included sponsoring weekly prayer gatherings, distributing religious tracts, organizing Sunday schools, and visiting jails, but its major accomplishment, which occurred in 1868, was the establishment of a Home for Friendless Women in Richmond. The facility had an all-male board of trustees, but Coffin served as president of its board of managers. Through these projects Coffin developed her leadership and organizational skills as she and her husband broadened their reform activities to the state and national levels.

=== Prison reformer ===
Coffin's effort on behalf of prison reform, especially her work to establish a separate state penitentiary for women in Indiana, made her a progressive leader in the national prison-reform movement and led her to champion other causes that assisted women and children.

The Coffins's work with the Marion Street Sabbath School in Richmond introduced them to prison and reformatory issues. On January 11, 1867, Indiana governor Oliver P. Morton, a childhood friend of Charles Coffin, appointed him to a commission tasked with investigating the need for a reformatory for boys. Based on the commission's findings, the state government established the House of Refuge for Juvenile Defenders, a reformatory school for boys in Plainfield, Indiana. Charles Coffin was named president of its board of managers. During the commission's work to establish the reformatory, Rhoda accompanied her husband in efforts to lobby the state government to establish the facility. As a result of their successful lobbying efforts, the Coffins established their reputation as advocates for prison reform. The experience also introduced Rhoda to Indiana politics and expanded her role.

In 1868, at request of Governor Conrad Baker, the Coffins visited Indiana's two state penitentiaries to report on their condition and recommend improvements. Rhoda was appalled by what she saw and learned, which included instances of abuse and mistreatment of male and female inmates at a state penitentiary in Jeffersonville, Indiana. As a result of the experiences she recommended that the state government construct separate prisons for men and women. She also advocated for a female-controlled women's prison facility. Coffin strongly believed that women were "best equipped to understand the needs of female inmates."

The Coffins spent months lobbying members of the Indiana General Assembly to support legislation to establish a women's prison and on May 13, 1869, the bill was approved. The Indiana Reformatory Institution for Women and Girls was established in Indianapolis, directed by a visiting board of men and women, with an all-male board of managers supervising its finances. The governor appointed Rhoda to the prison's first board of visitors. She believed in a new philosophy of prison reform that viewed prisons as rehabilitation centers and encouraged the incarcerated women to learn sewing and homemaking skills so that they would have work to do while they were in prison.

Coffin's success in securing a separate prison facility for women in Indiana and advocating for the rehabilitation of female inmates made her a well-known figure in the prison-reform movement. During the 1870s she traveled extensively, attended the first National Prison Conference in 1870, and visited prison systems in Europe and the Middle East with her husband.

After the Indiana Reformatory Institute opened on October 8, 1873, it received national acclaim, despite internal management problems and conflicts. Coffin and the board of visitors brought their concerns to the attention of the state legislature in 1876. She also addressed the issues in the first speech delivered by a woman at the National Prison Conference, where she continued to stress the need for female-control of women's prisons. Her efforts proved to be successful. In 1877, after the conclusion of an investigation, the Indiana General Assembly passed legislation to establish a new, all-female board that made the women's reformatory at Indianapolis the first prison in the United States to be entirely operated by women. Coffin was appointed to the board and became the board's president. After the new board of managers corrected the prison's weak financial condition, it went on to set a new standard of operation for other institutions to follow.

Coffin was active in overseeing the reformatory's progress while it was under construction and continued to promote prison reform throughout the country. Recognized as an expert on the subject and for her role as the founder and board president of Indiana's pioneering women's prison, Coffin also wrote articles and made conference presentations on the topic. However, by the early 1880s, divisions among the Quakers caused Coffin to reconsider her philanthropic activities. In addition, opposition to her leadership of the Indiana's women's prison board caused her to resign her position as its president in 1881 after controversies and inmate complaints about mistreatment. Although the Institute was not found guilty, news coverage raised questions about the prison leadership's motives and competence.

=== Women's rights advocate ===
Coffin's work on behalf of women's prison reform also shaped her view of women's rights. She became involved in the Women's Crusade of 1873, a grassroots effort among evangelical women against saloons. Coffin emerged as a leader among the Richmond crusaders. In November 1874, after the movement attracted strong local opposition, Coffin and other Richmond women established a chapter of the WCTU, a "more traditionally-structured temperance organization" to further their reform efforts.

Coffin's work on behalf of female prisoners and the legislative battles that ensued also led to her recognize the need for women's equality and political rights. In 1880 Coffin and others took on the task of persuading the board of the Indiana Hospital for the Insane to provide a female physician for the asylum, but the all-male board refused cooperate. After Coffin met with Governor Albert G. Porter, he eventually recommended the candidate the reform-mined group preferred and Doctor Sarah Stockton joined the asylum's staff. Coffin later remarked, "I came out of that contest a full-fledged woman suffragist." However, Coffin was not as radical as many suffragists and temperance crusaders and she never joined a suffrage organization to fight for women's right to vote. Instead, Coffin and her husband continued to support asylum reform. In 1882–83 they toured France, England, and Scotland on a fact-finding trip. While her husband reported his observations to Governor Porter and religious publication, Coffin provided the Indiana mental hospital with supplies and items to amuse its female patients.

Another example of Coffin's support of women's rights issues occurred in 1881. Coffin sided with Mahalah Jay, a professor at Earlham College's preparatory school, who was critical of the college's low number of female professors and the substantial pay discrepancy between its men and women faculty members. Coffin supported Jay's position on equal pay and favored the idea of women's right to "hold positions for which she was qualified."

== Later years ==
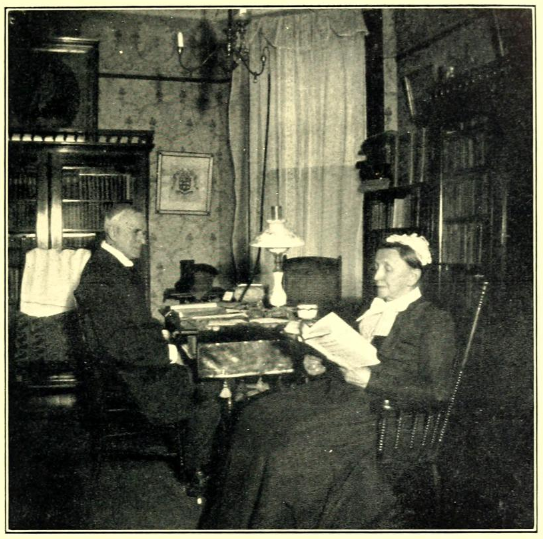
Charles F. Coffin and Rhoda M. Coffin in their home library in Chicago (c. 1905)

In 1884, Coffin's reputation was tarnished after a bank scandal involving her husband and their sons. When the Richmond National Bank failed and went into receivership, the community blamed the Coffin family for its demise. An investigation into the bank's management showed that its failure was due to large, unsecured loans that Charles Coffin had granted to his sons, as well as efforts to dilute the bank's stock value, misrepresent its assets, and embezzle funds. The bank failure caused the Coffins to lose much of their wealth and the scandal overshadowed the couple's prior accomplishments and limited their impact on future reform efforts.

Although Charles was not convicted in a court of law, the bank failure and subsequent scandal forced the Coffins to move to Chicago. It is not clear whether Rhoda knew the details of the bank's poor management practices prior to its failure, but many members of the community found her guilty by association. Coffin spent the remainder of her life in Chicago, where she continued to write and speak on prison reform. Coffin and her husband also visited Chicago prisons and insane asylums, but with less notice that they had received previously. As a member of the Protective Agency for Women and Children, she also worked secure laws to protect property rights of women and to protect and defend the rights of children.

== Death and legacy ==
In her final years, Coffin's health failed and she became less active. She died in Chicago on September 28, 1909. Her funeral was held in the Eighth Street Meeting, the successor to the Fifth Street Friends Meeting and the prayer group the Coffins established in Indiana the early 1860s; her remains were buried in the Earlham Cemetery at Richmond, Indiana.

Coffin first became known in 1864 for her efforts in establishing a mission school with her husband and, a home for women in need with other local women in Richmond, Indiana. However, she gained a national reputation for her efforts to successfully establish the Indiana Reformatory Institution for Women and Girls, the country's first female-controlled prison, and also served as president of its board of managers. Her lifelong interest in charitable work and social reform led to her assistance in securing the appointment of the first female physician to the staff of the Indiana Hospital for the Insane. After a bank scandal involving her husband and sons forced the Coffins to move to Chicago in 1884, Rhoda continued to advocate for prison reform, women's rights, and other causes.

Historians differ in their interpretation of Coffin's activities during the peak of her reform efforts in 1870s and 1880s. Carole D. Spencer argues that Coffin's work represents "a feminist's fight for women's rights in a male-dominated society," while Thomas D. Hamm considers her involvement in the Quaker renewal movement as a behind-the-scenes effort in partnership with her husband. Hamm maintains that Coffin was "content to remain in the socially acceptable and subordinate roles" that the more radical Quaker women reformers had rejected.

== Published works ==
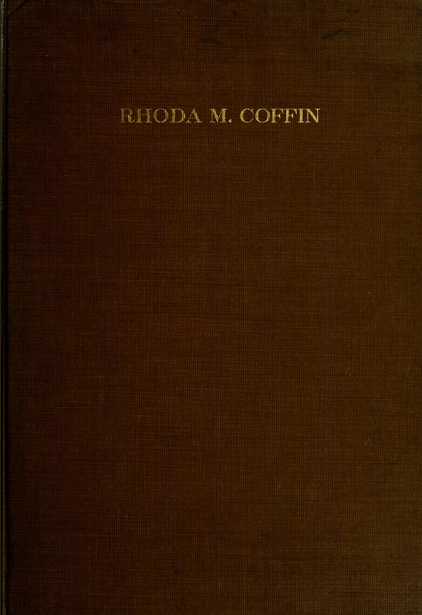
Rhoda M. Coffin, her reminiscences, addresses, papers and ancestry (1910)

- Rhoda M. Coffin, Her Reminiscences, Addresses, Papers and Ancestry (1910)

== Sources ==
- Coffin, Rhoda M. (Johnson), and Mary Coffin Johnson, ed. (1910). Rhoda M. Coffin, Her Reminiscences, Addresses, Papers and Ancestry. New York: Grafton Press.
- Ksander, Yael (April 16, 2007). "Rhoda Coffin". Moment of Indiana History.
- Lapp, Rachel J., and Anita K. Stalter (2007). More Than Petticoats: Remarkable Indiana Women. Guildford, Connecticut: Morris Book Publishing, LLC. pp. 13–24. ISBN 978-0-7627-3806-9.
- Swain, Ellen D. (2001). "From Benevolence to Reform: The Expanding Career of Mrs. Rhoda M. Coffin". Indiana Magazine of History. 97 (3). Bloomington: Indiana University: 190–217.
- Swain, Ellen, "Rhoda M. Coffin," in Gugin, Linda C.; St. Clair, James E., eds. (2015). Indiana's 200: The People Who Shaped the Hoosier State. Indianapolis: Indiana Historical Society Press. pp. 68–69. ISBN 978-0-87195-387-2.
