= Rockville Correctional Facility =

State prison in Indiana, US

- Interactive map of Rockville Correctional Facility
- Location: Adams Township, Parke County, Indiana
- Status: Open
- Security class: Mixed
- Capacity: 1,200
- Opened: 1970
- Managed by: Indiana Department of Corrections

Rockville Correctional Facility is a state prison located in Adams Township, Parke County, one mile (1.6 km) northwest of Rockville, Indiana. A part of the Indiana Department of Corrections, it is the largest state prison for women in Indiana with approximately 1,200 women. Although it is classified as a medium-security prison, it has inmates of all security levels.

== History ==
The facility was originally the Rockville Air Force Station, a radar base established by the U.S. Air Force in the beginning of the 1950s, only to be deserted ten years later. It was resurrected by the Department of Correction as a juvenile male correctional facility in 1970. The facility went through many changes after that: from a prison for older juveniles, to a co-ed prison for adolescent males and adult females, then finally to a prison for adult females in 1992. Before 1992, Indiana had only one women's prison, the Indiana Women's Prison, which was located in downtown Indianapolis and, therefore, unable to expand. Thus, the Department of Correction converted Rockville into a women's prison to serve the growing female population.

== Buildings and grounds ==
In 1995 the Indiana General Assembly approved a plan to rebuild Rockville completely. Following that decision, 23 structures were demolished, five were upgraded, 13 new buildings were built and the entire facility's infrastructure was replaced. The facility's campus is located on 52 acres (210,000 m^{2}) and now has 22 buildings and two employee residences. Dorm 1 was constructed in 1985 for juveniles and now houses the PLUS Unit. The other four dorms are almost identical in size and configuration. Dorm 2 was constructed in 1993 and now serves as the Intake Unit for the Indiana Department of Correction female offenders. The remaining dorms were completed in 1997. The Town of Rockville provides the prison's water and sewage services.

== Programs ==
Rockville's on-site school, Parkeview School, has a GED program as well as courses in culinary arts, building trades, computer literacy, horticulture, home maintenance and business technology. Oakland City University, Indiana State University and Ivy Tech all offer university courses for degrees. In addition, Oakland City University offers vocational training in Computer Assisted Drafting.

Rockville has several noteworthy programs for inmates. The Hope Center offers parenting classes for inmate mothers and allows them to practice their skills and establish a positive relationship with their children. The ICAAN Assistance Dog program allows inmates to train pups until they are fifteen months old. The inmates give the pups basic obedience training and teach them to do things such as opening doors, turning off lights, and carrying phones.

== Inmate population ==
Of the 1,205 inmates at Rockville, 67% are white, 29% are black, 2% are Hispanic and the remaining 2% are American Indian, Asian/Pacific and unknown. The average age of the women at intake is 33 and the average current age is 35. Nearly one-third of the women are there for substance abuse. The majority of the women at Rockville are serving sentences of two to ten years with less than 1% indeterminate life or life without parole. Only 5% are in prison for murder.

== Notable inmates ==
- Paula Cooper #864800 is perhaps Rockville's most infamous inmate, who was convicted in 1985 of killing a Sunday school teacher, Ruth Pelke, when Cooper was only fifteen years old. When she received the death penalty, she was the youngest person ever to be put on Indiana's Death Row. In 1986, while Cooper was on death row at the Indiana Women's Prison, her case was assigned to a new lawyer, Monica Foster. Foster and others organized a campaign to commute Cooper's death sentence. Two million people signed petitions to Indiana governor Robert D. Orr, and one million people signed petitions to the United Nations. In 1987, Governor Orr also received a well-publicized appeal from Pope John Paul II. The Indiana Supreme Court heard arguments on this case and on July 13, 1989, overturned the death sentence, giving Cooper a new sentence of 60 years, the maximum allowable prison term. She was later transferred to the Rockville Correctional Facility. Paula Cooper was released from Rockville Correctional Facility on June 17, 2013. The State of Indiana provided Cooper, who was 43 years old at the time, $75.00 "to help her make a fresh start."
- Sarah Jo Pender, #953968 who was serving a 110-year sentence for her participation in the murder of two people, managed to escape from Rockville on August 4, 2008. She was helped by correction officer Scott Spitler. She was added to the U.S. Marshals most wanted fugitive list in October 2008 and was then the only woman to be so. She was featured on America Most wanted and was arrested hours after a rerun of the TV-show, in December 2008.
- Amber Portwood from the reality TV series 16 and Pregnant and Teen Mom served 17 months of a five-year sentence for failing to complete court ordered drug testing while on probation for two years for domestic violence. Portwood had the option to avoid prison time by attending court-mandated rehab, but chose to go to prison instead. She has stated that had she not gone to prison, her drug problems would have led to her death. Portwood's sentence began in June 2012 and she was released in November 2013.
- Brandi Worley - Murdered her two children
- Laurie Tackett - murderer of Shanda Sharer, released in January 2018.

== Notable staff ==
Mass murderer Steven Kazmierczak, who shot and killed 5 students while wounding 21 others at Northern Illinois University in 2008, worked as a correctional officer at the Rockville Correctional Facility from September 24 to October 9, 2007.
