= Cale J. Bradford =

American judge

Chief Judge of the Indiana Court of Appeals
- In office January 1, 2020 – December 31, 2022
- Preceded by: Hon. Nancy H. Vaidik
- Succeeded by: Hon. Robert R. Altice, Jr.

Judge of the Indiana Court of Appeals
- Incumbent
- Assumed office August 1, 2007
- Appointed by: Mitch Daniels

Personal details
- Education: Indiana University, Bloomington (BA); Indiana University, Indianapolis (JD)

Cale J. Bradford is a judge of the Indiana Court of Appeals, who has also served as the court's Chief Judge. He was appointed to the Court's Second District on August 1, 2007, by Governor Mitch Daniels. He was selected to a three-year term to serve as the court's Chief Judge on January 1, 2020. Upon completion of his term, on December 31, 2022, Judge Bradford was succeeded by Judge Robert R. Altice Jr. as the court's Chief Judge.

Prior to his service on the Court of Appeals, Bradford served as a judge of the Marion County Superior Court. He was elected on January 1, 1997, and was the presiding judge for the 2005–2006 term, as well as being the juvenile division chair.

Bradford earned a B.S. at Indiana University Bloomington in 1982 and a J.D. at the Indiana University Robert H. McKinney School of Law in 1986.

== Controversy ==
In a child custody case, Judge Bradford approved a ruling of a magistrate forbidding either parent from instructing their son in their shared religious beliefs. The magistrate questioned how Wicca differed from Satanism and required the parents to shelter their child from "non-mainstream religious beliefs and rituals". This ruling was overturned on appeal.
