= Criminology & Public Policy =

- Discipline: Criminology
- Language: English
- Edited by: Cynthia Lum and Christopher Koper

Publication details
- History: 2001–present
- Frequency: Triannual
- Impact factor: 4.333 (2020)

Standard abbreviations
- ISO 4: Criminol. Public Policy

Indexing
- ISSN: 1538-6473 (print); 1745-9133 (web)
- LCCN: 2001248629
- OCLC no.: 237051428

Links
- Journal homepage; Online access; Online archive

Criminology & Public Policy is a peer-reviewed academic journal covering criminology and its implications for public policy. It was established in 2001 and is published by John Wiley & Sons on behalf of the American Society of Criminology. The Florida State University College of Criminology and Criminal Justice holds editorship of the journal, and the current editors-in-chief are Cynthia Lum and Christopher Koper. According to the Journal Citation Reports, the journal has a 2020 impact factor of 4.333, ranking it 9th out of 61 journals in the category "Criminology & Penology".
