= 2008 Northern Illinois University shooting =

Mass shooting in Illinois, U.S.

Coordinates: 41°56′03″N 88°46′08″W

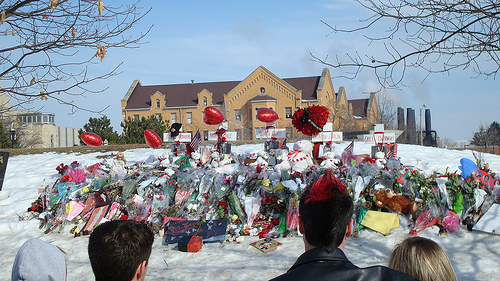
- Memorial for victims of the shooting
- Location: DeKalb, Illinois, U.S.
- Date: February 14, 2008; 18 years ago c. 3:05 – 3:11 p.m. (CST; UTC−06:00)
- Target: Students at Northern Illinois University
- Attack type: School shooting; mass shooting; murder-suicide; mass murder
- Weapons: Sawn-off 12 gauge Remington Sportsman 48 semi-automatic shotgun; 9mm Glock 19 semi-automatic pistol; .380 ACP SIG Sauer P232 semi-automatic pistol (attempted to fire but malfunctioned/unused); .380 ACP Hi-Point CF-380 semi-automatic pistol (unused)
- Deaths: 6 (including the perpetrator)
- Injuries: 21 (17 by gunfire)
- Perpetrator: Steven Phillip Kazmierczak
- Motive: Unknown

The 2008 Northern Illinois University shooting was a school shooting that took place on Thursday, February 14, 2008, at Northern Illinois University (NIU) in DeKalb, Illinois. Steven Kazmierczak, a 27-year-old 2006 NIU graduate, opened fire with a shotgun and three pistols in a crowd of students on campus, killing 5 students and injuring 17 more people, before fatally shooting himself.

The shooting happened at the campus's Cole Hall at approximately 3:05 p.m. Central Standard Time. The school placed the campus on lockdown; students and teachers were advised to head to a secure location, take cover, and avoid the scene and all buildings in the vicinity of the area.

After the shooting, the university administration cancelled classes for the rest of the week as well as the following week.

It is the deadliest school shooting in Illinois history.

== Events ==
=== Preparations ===
The night before the shooting, Kazmierczak called his girlfriend Jessica Baty to say goodbye and ask her not to forget about him. Baty told CNN that she had no idea that he could have been planning something. On Valentine's Day or the day that followed, Baty received two packages sent by Kazmierczak to her home in Wonder Lake, Illinois. The delivery included a copy of the book The Antichrist, a gun holster, ammunition, and a goodbye note thanking her for supporting him and wishing her a good future as a psychologist or social worker.

=== Scene and entrance ===
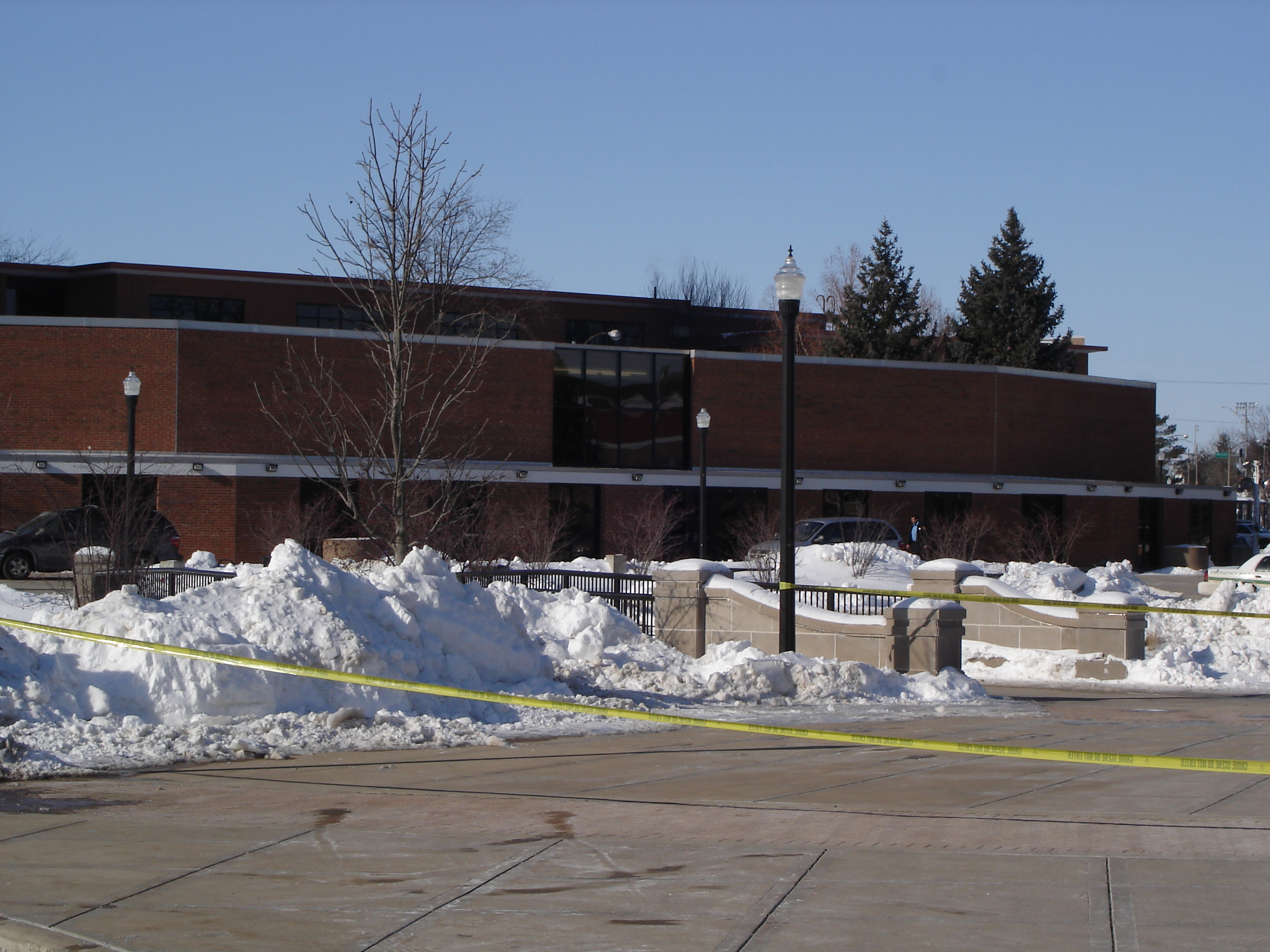
Entrance to Cole Hall, morning after the shootings

At approximately 3:05 p.m. CST, on February 14, 2008, Steven Kazmierczak entered a large auditorium-style lecture hall in Cole Hall (Auditorium 101), where an oceanography class was in session with approximately 120 students present. Kazmierczak was wearing dark brown boots with laces, jeans, a black T-shirt with the word "Terrorist" imposed over an image of an assault rifle, a coat, a black knit hat, and a black utility belt with two magazine holsters, a holster for a handgun, three handguns (a 9mm Glock 19, a .380 ACP SIG Sauer P232, and a .380 ACP Hi-Point CF-380), eight loaded magazines, and a knife. He also carried in a 12 gauge Remington Sportsman 48 shotgun concealed in a guitar case. He opened the auditorium door with such extreme force that many witnesses described him as "kicking the door in", entering at the extreme southwest corner, near the stage in front of the classroom, and began firing at the students. Police said that he was wearing a t-shirt with the word Terrorist on it.

=== Shooting ===
He next shot at the instructor, who was standing on the east side of the stage. The instructor tried to run out the exit at the southeast corner, but that door was locked. The instructor then ran out through the main exit at the east end of the classroom, through which the students were trying to leave. Some students who were not able to immediately escape hid under or in between the seats. When Kazmierczak paused to reload after firing three rounds, some students shouted "He's reloading," and began to escape. Others continued to hide or were too shocked to react. One of the victims, student Maria Christiansen, was critically struck in the face and neck. Christiansen would survive and later become an officer in the NIU Police Department.

After shooting all six shotgun rounds, Kazmierczak fired on the room's remaining occupants with the 9mm Glock pistol, firing a total of approximately 50 rounds. He was reported to have walked up and down the west aisle and directly in front of or on the stage, firing at people as he went. He shot and killed himself before police reached the room. The police recovered 55 unfired rounds of ammunition from the scene, including two fully loaded magazines containing rounds for a .380 semi-automatic pistol.

In a span of six minutes, Kazmierczak killed five students and injured several others before committing suicide by a self-inflicted gunshot wound to the head. A total of 18 people were shot, six of whom died (including the perpetrator, who shot himself before police arrived). One witness reported that the gunman shot "at least" 30 rounds, with police later confirming that they had collected 48 cartridge cases and 6 shotgun shells.

At the time of the shootings, Kazmierczak was a graduate student in the school of social work at the University of Illinois Urbana-Champaign. He was a former NIU Sociology graduate student. NIU Police Chief Donald Grady described him as "an outstanding student" who reportedly had stopped taking psychiatric medication recently and became "somewhat erratic."

=== Emergency response ===
The first 9-1-1 call of an active shooter was reported at 3:06 p.m. Seven seconds later, NIU police officers were notified by the dispatcher. At 3:06:33 p.m., NIU police officers Ayala and Zimberoff responded and told dispatchers that they were in the area. Driving northbound on Normal Road near Swen Parson Hall, they encountered students running east from the Martin Luther King Commons area. One student shouted, "He's shooting over there," pointing west towards the MLK Commons area. Officer Hodder was also driving in the area and encountered the same frenzy.

The officers proceeded in their vehicles, then on foot, joining Chief Grady, Lieutenant Mitchell, and Lieutenant Henert, who had reached the west side of the Commons area after coming directly from the Police Station. Also racing to Cole Hall from the Police Station were Sergeant Ellington and Officer Wright. Sergeant Holland was on patrol just south of the area along Lincoln Highway when he heard the call come in, and approached the area. In the MLK Commons, Chief Grady advised the officers to immediately begin attending to victims and identify witnesses and direct them to a room in Holmes Student Center, where they could be interviewed. Some of the officers began attending to injured students who were running from the scene.

While Henert established perimeters around Cole Hall, Mitchell and Grady entered the building, where they met with Holland, Ellington, and Wright. Ellington, the first officer to arrive on the scene, evacuated the adjacent auditorium, and met with the other officers in the front walkway. Holland was instructed to remain in the hallway to ensure no one came into the auditorium and that the shooter did not come out. Grady, Mitchell, Ellington, and Wright entered the south auditorium, discovering a body on the stage, surrounded by guns, with a pool of blood coming from the head. Victims with varying injuries lay on the floor or were propped up against the seats. Confirming there were no immediate threats, Grady and Mitchell began attending to victims, while Ellington and Wright confirmed that the shooter was dead. At 3:11:42 (five minutes after the first 911 call), Ellington reported to the dispatcher, "Shooter's down. Shotgun's secure. We need an ambulance and the coroner at Cole Hall."

At the same time that officers arrived at Cole Hall, Sergeant Rodman, who had left a meeting at the Holmes Student Center, arrived at the west entrance of that building to find a shooting victim who had been shot in the back and the head, along with another victim who had blood on the face, seeking help for his injured friend. Rodman attended to the most severely wounded victim.

By 3:11 p.m., a DeKalb Fire Department ambulance was the first to arrive on the scene and was staged in a nearby parking lot. The parking lots near the Field House were used as a staging area for ambulances and fire trucks that arrived from throughout the region. At 3:13 p.m., Sergeant Ellington advised that there were at least two deaths. Officers encountered several problems, including a piercing fire alarm that had been pulled, as well as very high radio traffic and static that made it hard to hear radio calls come in. In addition, due to conflicting reports (including the presence of a shooter at Founders Memorial Library) and the multitude of injured victims at various buildings around campus, officers needed to check multiple sites to rule out the possibility of multiple shooters and multiple shooting sites. Injured victims began appearing at Neptune Hall (just north of Cole Hall) and at DuSable Hall (west of Cole). At 3:21 p.m., as personnel arrived from the DeKalb Fire Department, DeKalb County Sheriff's Office, DeKalb Police Department, and Sycamore Police Department, officers advised that the scene and perimeter of Cole Hall were secure, and that it was safe for emergency personnel to proceed to the shooting site and to the sites of the injured victims.

At 3:34 p.m., after a sweep of Founders Library was conducted and officers determined that Neptune and DuSable were not shooting sites, they declared the area safe. Police officers established a reception area for law enforcement personnel at Wirtz Hall, and an investigative command center at Holmes Student Center. By 4:00 p.m. CST, school officials announced that there was no further danger. They said that counselors would be made available in all residence halls.

== Victims ==
=== Dead ===
Five people, all residents of Illinois, were killed by Kazmierczak:

| Name | Age | Hometown |
|---|---|---|
| Catalina Garcia | 20 | Cicero |
| Julianna Gehant | 32 | Mendota |
| Ryanne Mace | 19 | Carpentersville |
| Daniel Parmenter | 20 | Elmhurst |
| Gayle Dubowski | 20 | Carol Stream |
| Steven Kazmierczak (perpetrator) | 27 | Elk Grove Village |

Catalina Garcia, Juliana Gehant, Ryanne Mace, and shooter Steven Kazmierczak were declared dead on the scene at Cole Hall, while Daniel Parmenter was pronounced dead shortly after arrival to Kishwaukee Hospital at 4:00 p.m. Gayle Dubowski was flown to the nearest trauma center, St. Anthony Hospital in Rockford, where she was pronounced dead shortly after arrival at 4:14 p.m.

=== Injured ===
21 people survived the incident with injuries. 17 sustained gunshot wounds, while three injured their knees or backs escaping the scene; one injury was undetermined. Of them, three remained in Cole Hall, five had fled to Neptune Hall or its parking lots, one to DuSable Hall, two to the Holmes Student Center Bookstore, two to the Holmes Student Center's Sandburg Auditorium, three to the Health Services Building, and five returned home to seek treatment.

16 of the injured victims were transported to DeKalb's Kishwaukee Community Hospital. One was transferred by helicopter to Rockford's Saint Anthony Medical Center, three to Downers Grove's Good Samaritan Hospital, and one to Rockford Memorial Hospital.

On February 15, another victim sought treatment at Kishwaukee Hospital, bringing the total of hospitalized injured victims to 17. On February 15, seven of the victims were in critical condition, one in good condition, one in stable, and eight discharged, according to Kishwaukee Community Hospital.

Like those killed, all who were injured were from Illinois.

== Investigation and psychological profile ==
NIU launched its own investigation into the shooting along with local police and the FBI. The FBI established that Kazmierczak had been particularly obsessed with Seung-Hui Cho, who perpetrated the Virginia Tech shooting, and with Eric Harris and Dylan Klebold, the two shooters of the Columbine High School massacre. His freshman roommates at NIU recalled Kazmierczak's obsessions with figures like Adolf Hitler and serial killer Ted Bundy.

On February 17, 2008, CNN interviewed Kazmierczak's girlfriend Jessica Baty at her home in Wonder Lake. Baty expressed shock at her boyfriend's actions and said that the "person who went into Cole Hall and did that" was not the person she knew, adding that Kazmierczak was "anything but a monster" and probably "the nicest, (most) caring person ever." Baty also stated that Kazmierczak had stopped taking his psychiatric medications three weeks before the shooting because "(it) made him feel like a zombie." The medications prescribed by a psychiatrist included Xanax, Prozac, and Ambien.

NIU Police Chief Donald Grady said that Baty's statements to CNN were contradictory, alleging that Baty had told them that Kazmierczak had been acting erratically days before the shooting. In response to Grady, Baty said she was "upset" over the police chief's remarks, and added that she never said that Kazmierczak was erratic, pointing instead to having stated that he was "just a little more irritable."

According to mental health professionals who treated Kazmierczak, he used to be noncompliant with the treatment and further described him as anxious, defiant, and verbally aggressive sometimes. Psychiatric records from the last group home where he resided noted that he suffered from insomnia and hypersomnia as well as having tendencies for self-mutilation.

The NIU Final Report also indicated that in the months leading up to the shooting, Kazmierczak experienced emotional distress dealing with unresolved issues with his parents and issues like resentment and denial towards his mental health problems. One of his psychiatrists wrote of Kazmierczak's unwillingness to open up and accept treatment because he did not generally like to see himself as mentally troubled. As a result, he often concealed his conditions and lied about his past mental health troubles, with Laura Gbadamashi, one of Kazmierczak's group home coordinators saying that he "never wanted to identify with being mentally ill", and that it was seen as his main problem by them. A nurse who knew Kazmierczak from a brief stay at a psychiatric hospital during his adolescence recalled Kazmierczak as resistant to taking medications and prone to self-harm.

The last contact between Steven and his sister Susan was on October 26, 2007, when he sent her a strongly worded email calling her "rude" and "disrespectful." Testifying for investigators, Susan recounted Steven's behavior as an adolescent which, according to her, included verbal violence and insults towards their mother, whom Kazmierczak blamed for his involuntary hospitalizations.

== Perpetrator ==
Kazmierczak at the University of Illinois, circa 2008

Steven Phillip Kazmierczak (August 26, 1980 – February 14, 2008) was born in Hoffman Estates, Illinois and grew up in nearby Elk Grove Village. He was a student at the University of Illinois at the time of the shooting and was a former student at Northern Illinois University. Kazmierczak exhibited mental health problems his whole life and underwent multiple instances of treatment. However, a psychologist who investigated his profile, said that Kazmierczak knew to disguise his public persona, deliberately concealing and withholding information about his impulses and thoughts, as well as his mental health history. A mental health group coordinator stated that Kazmierczak's main problem was never wanting to identify with being mentally ill.

=== Early life ===
Kazmierczak was born on the night of August 26, 1980, in Hoffman Estates, Illinois, the second child of Robert and Gail Kazmierczak. He had an older sister and the family resided in nearby Elk Grove Village. He went to elementary and high school in that city, attending Salt Creek Elementary and Elk Grove High School, from which he graduated in 1998. He graduated from Elk Grove High School in 1998, during which he was treated temporarily for mental illness at the Elk Grove Village Thresholds-Mary Hill House psychiatric center, as a result of being "unruly" at home, according to his parents Gail and Robert Kazmierczak

While attending Elk Grove High, Kazmierczak met Joe Russo, who would remain his closest friend, staying in touch until Kazmierczak's death. Kazmierczak's family ties were limited and negative, developing a sibling rivalry with his sister Susan, which ended in a lifelong enmity. When she was interviewed after the shooting at NIU, Susan told police that she was surprised that "(Steven) hadn't come to kill me."

Kazmierczak's father, Robert, an employee of the United States Postal Service, was described as a present father but largely uninvolved regarding Steven and his behaviors.

He later went on to study sociology at Northern Illinois University (NIU). Though his family moved to Florida in 2004, Kazmierczak continued his education in Illinois.

=== Early criminal activity ===
Kazmierczak had minor encounters with the Elk Grove Village Police Department. On February 6, 1994, Steven and Joe Russo, aged 13 and 14, respectively, were arrested for placing an improvised Drano explosive on a neighbor's porch. Because no person was hurt and the explosive causing no damage, police handled the boys administratively and did not pursue any action.

On September 22, 1996, Kazmierczak and another friend, Peter Rachowsky, were arrested for trespassing and rummaging through a property of the Pepsi Cola Company. The boys, both aged 16, were again detained at the Elk Grove Village Police station but they were released without charges.

In March 1998, Kazmierczak had several encounters with Elk Grove Village police. On March 10, his mother reported him missing; Kazmierczak returned home unharmed two days later. On March 17, he filed a report against his friend Peter Rachowsky over threats of violence. Kazmierczak had previously testified against Rachowsky for allegedly selling illegal drugs. As a result, Rachowsky was arrested on March 18, 1998.

Between April 2002 and June 2003, Kazmierczak had three last contacts with local police, in one case as a complainant for the gas station where he was employed and in the other two incidents as a witness of theft occurring at his workplace. Following these interactions, he remained clean and without having any trouble with police.

=== Military service ===
Between 1999 and September 2001, Kazmierczak held a handful of short-term jobs, including at a Things Remembered store, Walgreens, Jewel-Osco, McDonald's, Walmart, and the United Parcel Service. In all these jobs, Kazmierczak was terminated for either showing behavioral or attendance problems as well as not enduring workplace stress.

Kazmierczak joined U.S. Army on September 20, 2001, and was sent to Fort Sill, Oklahoma with the 6th Air Defense Artillery Brigade for basic training, which he passed. In December 2001, he was reassigned and dispatched to Fort Bliss, Texas. However, someone in the Army found out that Kazmierczak had concealed his past mental health problems, which would have disqualified him from joining the military. He was subsequently evaluated by psychiatrists at the William Beaumont Army Medical Center, from where he was subsequently given an uncharacterized discharge. Kazmierczak returned to Illinois on February 14, 2002.

Other sources claim that he was discharged before completing basic training in February 2002 for lying on his application about his mental illness.

=== Personal life ===
In September 2006, his mother died in Lakeland, Florida, from amyotrophic lateral sclerosis (also known as Lou Gehrig's disease or ALS). At the time of Steven's death, his father was living in a retirement community in Lakeland.

=== College years ===
In August 2002, Kazmierczak enrolled at Northern Illinois University (NIU), graduating as a bachelor of arts with a Dean's award and later majoring in sociology (with an emphasis on criminology) and political sciences in 2007. He was described by faculty and tutors as a standout student and never had problems with campus police or any disciplinary incident. Kazmierczak and one of his mentoring professors authored an article about self-harm in U.S. prisons which was published in the academic journal Criminology & Public Policy.

Despite being regarded as a model student by faculty, Kazmierczak was described as "strange" or "weird" by his residence hall roommate and other students, who reported that Kazmierczak used to keep to himself and obsessively focus on his studies. During his time at NIU, Kazmierczak had few friends and was known for his fascination with horror movies and violent video games.

Kazmierczak graduated from NIU in 2006 where he received the Dean's award in 2006 and was considered a stand-out, well-regarded student. Campus police describe him as a "fairly normal" and an "unstressed person." Faculty, students, and staff "revered" him, and there was no indication of any trouble. Kristie Bongiovanni (now formally Kristie Crane), academic advisor of the sociology department, worked closely with Kazmierczak and described never having seen any behaviors indicative of violence. NIU President John G. Peters said that he had "a very good academic record, no record of trouble." Kazmierczak was vice-president of the NIU chapter of the American Correctional Association; he had also written about the U.S. correctional system, specifically prisons.

In 2006, Kazmierczak, along with two other graduate students and under the lead authorship of a sociology professor, co-authored an academic paper entitled "Self-injury in Correctional Settings: 'Pathology' of Prisons or of Prisoners?"; it was published in the academic journal Criminology & Public Policy.

After his graduation in 2006, Kazmierczak continued taking courses at NIU, including classes in Arabic and politics of the Middle East. He subsequently abandoned these courses and enrolled in social work at the University of Illinois, where he intended to specialize in the field of mental health. Towards the end of 2007, Kazmierczak held a job at the Rockville Correctional Facility near Rockville, Indiana, abandoning the position without a clear explanation. In early 2008, shortly before the shooting at NIU, Kazmierczak was again enrolled at the University of Illinois.

In November 2007, Kazmierczak visited his father, then living in Lakeland, Florida, on a trip that Kazmierczak made with his girlfriend Jessica Baty and his friend Joe Russo. During conversations with his father, Kazmierczak was provided with his whole psychiatric history and was told that his mother had never forgiven him for disrupting the family. The conflicts between Kazmierczak and his parents were never resolved and he did not visit his father again after that trip. Kazmierzak's mother, Gail, died in Lakeland in September 2006 from ALS.

He was enrolled at NIU in the spring of 2007, where he took two courses in Arabic and a course called Politics of the Middle East. He left to begin graduate work in the School of Social Work at the University of Illinois, where he intended to study mental health issues. He was enrolled part-time at the University of Illinois during the fall of 2007 and worked from September 24 through October 10 at the Rockville Correctional Facility for Women near the Illinois–Indiana border. His reasons for leaving were unclear; he simply "did not come back to work," according to Doug Garrison of the Indiana Department of Correction. By early 2008, at the time of the shooting, he was again enrolled full-time at the University of Illinois.

=== Possible motives ===
Kazmierczak died of a self-inflicted gunshot wound after the shooting ended (meaning no one could now question him on why he committed the shooting). ABC News reports that his behavior seemed to become more erratic in the weeks leading up to the shooting, and that it is believed he stopped taking medication beforehand. His girlfriend confirmed that Kazmierczak was taking Xanax (anti-anxiety), Ambien (sleep aid), and Prozac (antidepressant), all of which were prescribed to him by a psychiatrist. She said that he stopped taking Prozac about three weeks prior to the February 14 shooting. She also said that, during their two-year relationship, she had never seen him display violent tendencies and she expressed bewilderment over the cause of the rampage. "He was anything but a monster," she said. "He was probably the nicest, most caring person ever." She also confirmed that Kazmierczak had called her early on Valentine's Day to say goodbye. She said that Kazmierczak called her at midnight and told her not to forget about him. After the shooting, authorities intercepted a number of packages he sent to her, which included such items as a gun holster and ammunition, a textbook on serial killers for her class, the book The Antichrist by Friedrich Nietzsche, and a final note written for her, signed with his given name and family name.

The shooting was baffling to those who knew him, as he appeared outgoing and never appeared to have social problems. Investigators were also puzzled by their failure to find a suicide note. Some of Kazmierczak's former NIU roommates described him as a quiet man who usually stayed to himself. They stated that, while fairly normal, they did not see him spend much time with other students.

However, a story published by Esquire confirmed his history of mental illness and alleged that he had attempted suicide, was bullied in high school and had shown an interest in previous school shootings, particularly those that occurred at Columbine High School and Virginia Tech. According to a report published by the United States Fire Administration, Kazmierczak is believed to have studied Virginia Tech perpetrator Seung-Hui Cho's actions and used a similar modus operandi.

Kazmierczak described himself as a sensitive person in his personal statement for the University of Illinois graduate school. He also felt victimized during his adolescent years. He expressed interest in helping people with mental problems, and wanted to work with people "in need of direction."

== Reaction ==
Multiple makeshift memorials, including this one near the MLK Commons facing Cole Hall, were established across the NIU campus in the days after the shooting.

The university's official website reported the possibility of a gunman on campus at 3:20 p.m., within 20 minutes of the shooting. The website then warned students, "There has been a report of a possible gunman on campus. Get to a safe area and take precautions until given the all clear. Avoid the King Commons and all buildings in that vicinity." By 3:40 p.m., all NIU classes were canceled for the remainder of the day and the campus was closed by NIU officials as part of a new security plan devised after the Virginia Tech shootings 10 months earlier. Students were asked to contact their parents as soon as possible.

All NIU Huskie sporting events, home and away, through Sunday were canceled. Most students left campus for the weekend. A spokesman for the ATF stated that agents were dispatched to the scene to assist and to help trace the weapons used. The FBI also sent agents to assist. According to police, Steven Kazmierczak removed the hard drive from his laptop computer and a computer chip from his cell phone and did not leave a note that could help explain why he chose a geology class on Valentine's Day to open fire. Investigators were expected to spend at least three more weeks until releasing a report on the incident.

=== Vigils and memorial services ===
Approximately 2,000 gathered on campus on the evening of Friday, February 15, for a candlelight vigil to commemorate the victims; among other public figures, Jesse Jackson and Robert W. Pritchard spoke. In the days after the shooting, the Lutheran Campus Ministry held nightly candlelight vigils. All classes and athletic events were canceled through February 24, 2008. Faculty and staff returned to work on Tuesday, February 19, and for the remainder of that week received special information and training to help students upon their return to classes the following week.

On February 21, exactly a week after the shooting happened, five minutes of silence were observed from 3:06–3:11 p.m. CST, accompanied by the tolling of bells throughout the community, at a special ceremony attended by thousands in memory of the victims which was held at the MLK Commons. Moments of silence were also held elsewhere throughout the DeKalb community. There was a special memorial service held in the NIU Convocation Center on February 24, the day before classes resumed, in honor of the victims that initiated a set of activities and services aimed at community recovery. Due to the loss of one week of instructional time in the middle of the semester, an extra week was added in May.

=== Condolences and tributes ===
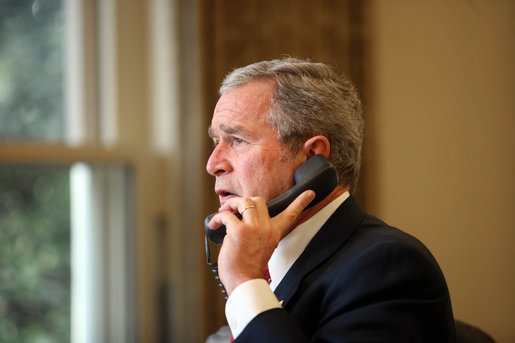
U.S. President George W. Bush speaks with University president John Peters via telephone from the White House to offer his condolences.

Reactions came from all over the country, including President George W. Bush, Illinois Governor Rod Blagojevich, and U.S. Senator Barack Obama, among others. Singer Jon Bon Jovi expressed his condolences to the NIU community and canceled rehearsals at the NIU Convocation Center which were due to begin the day of the shooting. He and his band Bon Jovi were due to kick off the North American leg of their Lost Highway Tour.

United States President George W. Bush, Illinois Governor Rod Blagojevich, U.S. Senators Barack Obama and Dick Durbin, and U.S. Congressman Donald Manzullo offered their personal condolences to NIU President John Peters and the university community in wake of the tragedy, as did many local communities and school districts, and a plethora of universities across the United States.

The Chicago Blackhawks NHL franchise wore NIU Huskies decals on their helmets during their game on Sunday, February 17, 2008, versus the Colorado Avalanche. A moment of silence was also observed before the national anthem at the game, and the team wore the same decal during its next two games at the St. Louis Blues and at home against the Minnesota Wild. The Chicago Wolves of the AHL held an NIU night during which there was a moment of silence and NIU students were given the opportunity to participate during in game promotions. The Rockford Icehogs, also of the AHL, wore their red jerseys on the following Friday and Saturday night during the team's two home games at the Rockford MetroCentre, distributed red and black ribbons, had a 5 ft by 16 ft (1.5 m x 5 m) sign for people to sign, as well as encouraged fans to wear red to the game.

During spring training, Chicago White Sox manager Ozzie Guillén and general manager Ken Williams sported NIU caps in tribute to the victims. For their 2008 season, the Chicago Cubs flew an NIU flag over the grandstands in the out field. Virginia Tech had a tribute with students wearing shirts saying "Hokies for Huskies". Students wore these shirts during their basketball game against Georgia Tech on February 23, 2008.

Jon Bon Jovi offered his condolences in a Billboard magazine article after his band Bon Jovi was forced to cancel rehearsals slated to begin on February 14, 2008, at the NIU Convocation Center in preparation for the North American leg of the Lost Highway Tour. The Chicago-based Jam/Prog Rock band Umphrey's McGee played a benefit show at the Egyptian Theater on April 8, 2008, for the NIU Memorial Fund. The incident was also immortalized as the subject of a David Bowie song called "Valentine's Day" on the long-awaited comeback album of 2013, The Next Day.

=== Family of the perpetrator ===
Following the shooting, Robert Kazmierczak, who was living in a retirement community near Auburndale, Florida, asked reporters to leave him alone, citing his problems with diabetes and saying that it was a "very hard time" for him. His sister Susan put a written statement on the door of her home in Urbana, Illinois, expressing shock and sadness at her brother's actions and conveying sympathies for the victims.

=== Other reactions ===
The manager of the apartment complex where Kazmierczak had lived since June 2007 in Champaign, Illinois, put a written statement on Kazmierczak's apartment's door, saying that since he moved into the apartment, Kazmierczak had paid his rent and never came to the administration's attention for any reason.

Jim Thomas, an NIU emeritus professor who had befriended Kazmierczak and Baty, said that they looked like a typical young couple and did not recall any abuse or conflict in their relationship. Baty also denied that they had had a rocky time together, while the Final Report from NIU suggested that Baty tolerated Kazmierczak's behaviors and allowed his eccentricities.

=== Cole Hall renovation ===
After February 14, 2008, Cole Hall was closed to the public. Classes that were held in the building's two large auditoriums were relocated. On February 25, 2008, then-governor Rod Blagojevich and university president John G. Peters proposed the demolition of the current Cole Hall. The proposal came as a response to the traumatic memories of the students who have to attend classes in the building. The proposal would tear down Cole Hall, leave the Cole Hall site as a memorial site, and erect a new building called "Memorial Hall" nearby, at a cost of approximately $40 million.

However, due to mixed emotions on the decision, President Peters sent out a message to all NIU students via their student email accounts, soliciting comments from students and the extended NIU family. In addition, a committee was established to help reach a consensus on the future of Cole Hall.

On May 8, 2008, it was announced that Cole Hall would be remodeled inside and out pending $7.7 million in state funding. This decision was made based on conversations between Dr. Peters and members of the campus community as well as the results of an online survey taken by students and faculty.

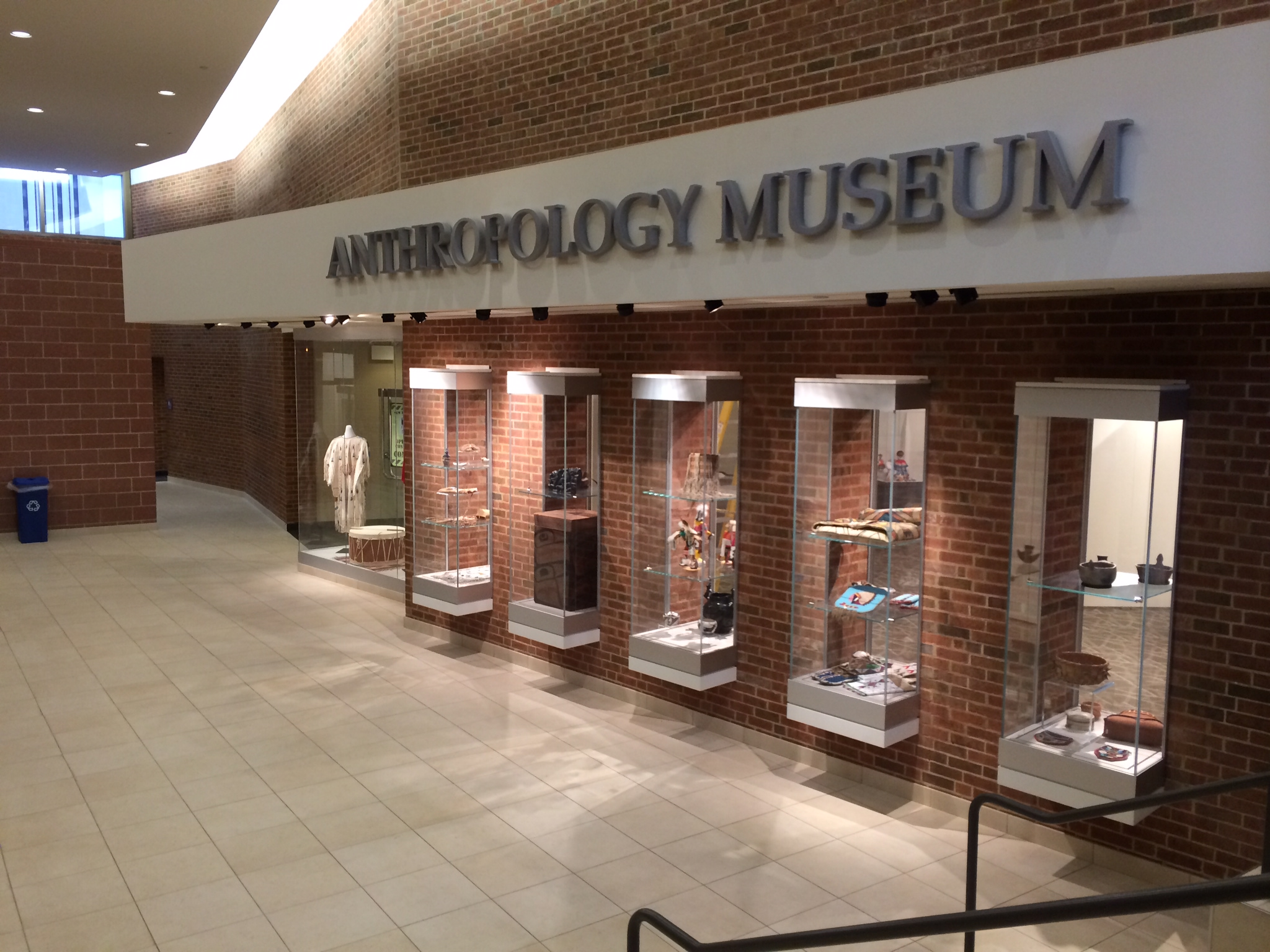
The Anthropology Museum in the renovated Cole Hall

On August 27, 2009, the NIU Board of Trustees approved a $9.5 million budget on the Cole Hall renovation project, approximately $8 million of which will come from the aforementioned state funding, and the rest from student fees. The East auditorium, which was the scene of the incident, will no longer be used for classes, and a replacement lecture hall will be built elsewhere on campus. On January 27, 2010, Illinois Governor Pat Quinn came to the NIU campus to release the funds for the renovation of Cole Hall.

On January 14, 2011, the reconstruction at Cole Hall officially commenced. The building re-opened on January 17, 2012. Cole Hall now houses the Anthropology Museum, which was housed in the Stevens Building previously.

=== Memorial garden and sculpture ===
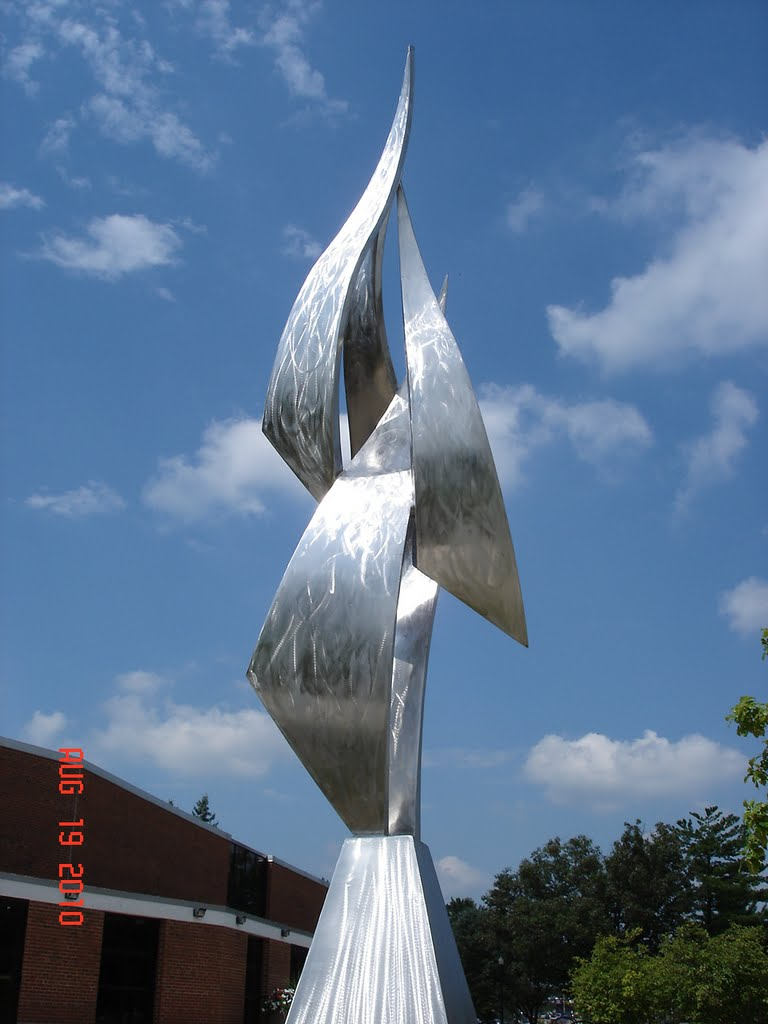
The sculpture at the Memorial garden

On October 2, 2009, a metal sculpture designed by artist Bruce Niemi entitled Remembered was unveiled at Northern Illinois University. The sculpture is part of a garden built in remembrance of the victims of the NIU shooting, located directly across from Cole Hall. The memorial area also features five red granite walls erected in a half-circle pattern which read "Forward Together Forward Together Forward." The phrase "Forward Together Forward", borrowed from the university's fight song, became a motto and theme used in the healing of the NIU community after the shooting. Each wall features the name of one of the students who died in the shooting. A walking path with benches is also included. The memorial is flanked by trees and shrubbery. The memorial was funded entirely by private donations.

== Graffiti warning ==
The campus was shut down on December 10, 2007, the first day during exam week, after graffiti was found on a restroom wall warning of a possible shooting. A university spokesman said that the warning, which was discovered December 10, made reference to the Virginia Tech massacre, in which 32 people were killed, but it could not be immediately determined whether the threat was related to the shootings on February 14, 2008. The Chicago Sun-Times reported at that time that an unknown person posted the graffiti in the Grant Towers D residence hall, which included a racial slur and the notation "What time? The VA tech shooters [sic] messed up w/ having only one shooter." However, NIU President John Peters stated that he did not believe that the December incident is connected to the February 14 shootings.

== See also ==
- List of school shootings in the United States by death toll
- List of homicides in Illinois
- List of school-related attacks
- Virginia Tech shooting
- Lane Bryant shooting, another Illinois mass shooting in February 2008
- Murder of Larry King, another school shooting that occurred two days earlier
- Stoneman Douglas High School shooting, another school shooting that occurred exactly 10 years later
