= Indiana Court of Appeals =

Appellate court of Indiana, US

The Indiana Court of Appeals is the intermediate-level appellate court for the state of Indiana. It is the successor to the Indiana Appellate Court.

== History ==
The Indiana Appellate Court was created by the Indiana General Assembly by statute in 1891. It was originally created to be a temporary appellate court to handle overflow cases from the Indiana Supreme Court. The Appellate Court was not intended to be a permanent institution; the original statute specified that it would only exist for six years. But in 1897, the General Assembly voted to keep the court for another four years (due to the Supreme Court's increasing caseload), and then voted to make it permanent in 1901. It was at this point that the court began its function as an intermediate appellate court.

In 1970, the Constitution of Indiana was amended to create the current Indiana Court of Appeals. The court began hearing cases on January 1, 1972.

== Jurisdiction ==
The Court of Appeals hears appeals from the Indiana trial courts, including some interlocutory appeals. It also handles appeals from some state government agencies, such as the Worker's Compensation Board, Department of Workforce Development, and Utility Regulatory Commission. Though the Court of Appeals judges represent different districts within Indiana, each panel of judges has statewide jurisdiction.

== Judges ==
The court was originally created with nine judges: one three-judge panel for each of three districts. The court was later expanded to fifteen judges (five districts, each with one three judge panel).

=== Sitting judges ===
Names in bold are the presiding judges of their district, while italic font is used to designate the court's chief judge.

District	Name	Start	Term Ends (Note: Term ends Dec. 31 of the year listed.)	Appointer	Law School
1st	Peter Foley	October 11, 2022	2034	Eric Holcomb (R)	IU McKinney
1st	Mark Bailey	January 30, 1998	2030	Frank O'Bannon (D)	IU McKinney
1st	**Leanna Weissmann**	September 14, 2020	2032	Eric Holcomb (R)	IU McKinney
2nd	**Robert Altice**	September 2, 2015	2028	Mike Pence (R)	Missouri-Kansas City
2nd	Cale Bradford	August 1, 2007	2030	Mitch Daniels (R)	IU McKinney
2nd	Dana Kenworthy	January 16, 2023	2026	Eric Holcomb (R)	IU McKinney
3rd	Elizabeth Tavitas	August 6, 2018	2030	Eric Holcomb (R)	Notre Dame
3rd	**Paul Mathias**	March 30, 2000	2032	Frank O'Bannon (D)	Indiana Maurer
3rd	Stephen Scheele	January 8, 2025	2028	Eric Holcomb (R)	Indiana Maurer
4th	Rudolph Pyle	August 27, 2012	2034	Mitch Daniels (R)	Indiana Maurer
4th	**Melissa May**	April 9, 1998	2030	Frank O'Bannon (D)	IU McKinney
4th	Mary DeBoer	October 15, 2024	2026	Eric Holcomb (R)	Valparaiso
5th	Nancy Vaidik	February 7, 2000	2032	Frank O'Bannon (D)	Valparaiso
5th	**Elaine Brown**	May 5, 2008	2030	Mitch Daniels (R)	Indiana Maurer
5th	Paul Felix	July 28, 2023	2026	Eric Holcomb (R)	Indiana Maurer

== See also ==
- Indiana Supreme Court
- Government of Indiana
- Courts of Indiana
