= Jane Agnes Stewart =

American author (1860–1944)

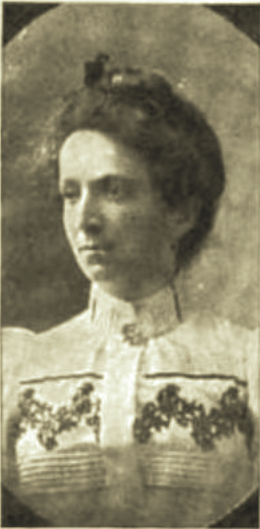
- Born: August 16, 1860; Boston, Massachusetts, U.S.
- Died: February 2, 1944 (aged 83); Toledo, Ohio, U.S.
- Occupations: author; editor; contributor to periodicals
- Writing career
- Pen name: Jane A. Stewart
- Notable work: The Frances Willard Book

Jane Agnes Stewart (August 16, 1860 – February 2, 1944) was an American author, editor, and contributor to periodicals. She was a special writer for many journals on subjects related to woman's, religious, educational, sociological, and reform movements. Stewart was a suffragist and temperance activist. She traveled to London, Edinburgh, and Paris as a delegate of world's reform and religious conventions.

== Early life and education ==
Jane Agnes Stewart was born in Boston, Massachusetts, August 16, 1860. Her parents were Alexander Paton and Mary Davidson (Denyven) Stewart. Jane was a descendant of Robert the Bruce, whose daughter, Marjorie Bruce, married Walter Stewart, 6th High Steward of Scotland.

Stewart was educated in the public and private schools of Glasgow, Scotland; Boston, Massachusetts; and Toledo, Ohio, graduating in 1876 from Toledo High School.

== Career ==
She was a contributor to the Toledo Blade. She was an associate editor of The Union Signal, Chicago, Illinois (1892–97); editor of the Oak and Ivy Leaf, Chicago and Young Women, Chicago (1891–96); editorial writer, at the Boston Evening Transcript (1898–?) and the Boston Beacon (1898–1902); press correspondent in Europe; and on the editorial staff of the American Sunday School Union, Philadelphia (1909–?).

Stewart favored woman suffrage. She was a member of the Philadelphia Woman's Suffrage Society as well as the Philadelphia County Suffrage Association whose monthly newsletter she helped edit. She also contributed on suffrage to various periodicals. In 1906, it was announced that Stewart was the inventor of the first equal rights calendar. Technically, it was known as the "Birthday Calendar of Suffrage Women'. It was perpetual, that is, by an arrangement of the dates, it could be made to fit any year simply by shifting a small slip. The pictures on each page were likenesses of many of the earliy suffrage leaders, including portraits of Lucretia Mott, Lucy Stone, Elizabeth Cady Stanton, Susan B. Anthony, Julia Ward Howe, Mary Livermore, Frances Willard, and Mrs. Lillian M. N. Stevens. There were also many quotations from prominent women in favor of equal suffrage. Those on the first page were from Carrie Chapman Catt and M. Carey Thomas.

Ever since the death of Frances Willard, Stewart observed the anniversaries of the leader's death by writing articles for various periodicals on some phase of Willard's life and work. These appeared in the Christian Endeavor World and the Journal of Education, Boston; the School Journal and the Christian Intelligencer, New York; the Interior, Chicago; the Presbyterian Banner, Pittsburgh; Little Folks, the Boston Transcript, and the Philadelphia Record. These sketches, with some others, were brought together in The Frances Willard Book. Stewart was also the author of The Kindergarten, What Is It?; The Christmas Book; Birthday Calendar Suffrage Women; and Birthday Calendar Temperance Women.

She visited Europe in 1895 in the interest of temperance work, was two years in California, returned to Boston for editorial work, went abroad again in 1900 to visit parts of France, Switzerland, Germany, Holland, Belgium, and Italy, covering the Paris Exposition, World's W.C.T.U. Convention at Edinburgh, and the International Christian Endeavor Convention at London.

Stewart served as Chair of the National Press Committee, the National Congress of Mothers (1900–10), and the American School Peace League. She was the president of the Young Woman's Christian Temperance Union (W.C.T.U.) of Toledo, Chicago, and Los Angeles, and a member of the Philadelphia W.C.T.U.

She was the treasurer of the Pennsylvania State Woman's Press Association; director, Pennsylvania Arbitration and Peace Society (1908–21); and a leader of the Christian Civic Club (children). She was a member of the American Academy of Political and Social Science, the Pennsylvania Society of New England Women, the National Geographic Society, the Pennsylvania State Women's Press Association, the Philadelphia League of Home and School Association, the Philadelphia Public Education Association, the Toledo Sunday School Association, the League of Women Voters, as well as the Shakespeare Club, Women's Educational Club, Samagama Club, and the 1896 Literary Club.

== Personal life ==
In religion, Stewart was a Congregationalist, and a member of the Central Congregational Church, Philadelphia. In politics, she was independent.

Jane Agnes Stewart died in Toledo, Ohio, February 2, 1944.

== Selected works ==
=== Books ===
- The Frances Willard Book (1906)
- The Christmas Book (1908)
- Peace on Earth (1914)
- I Have Recalled: A Pen-panorama of a Life (1938)
- Frances E. Willard: A Great Teacher (with Lillian M. N. Stevens, between 1898 and 1925)
- The Girl from Ohio: One of Frances Willard's Girls (1939)

=== Articles ===
- "The Kindergarten, What Is It?"
- "Women Deans of Women's Colleges" (1902)
- "Public Swimming Baths" (1902)
- "What is Being Done in Textile Education" (1902)
- "Memories of Frances E. Willard. Kindly Thoughtfulness of Our Great Leader to One of Her Associates" (1919)
- "Patriotic Festival for Soldiers' Return" (1919)
- "Flowers in France for America's Dead" (1919)
- "Effects of the War on Beer Drinking in Germany" (1919)
- "The 'Win the War for Permanent Peace' Convention" (1919)
- "Sidelight on Coal Shortage Situation. Pennsylvania Miners and Drink." (1919)
- "A Great Teacher" (1919)
- "The Long, Long Trail That Led to the Suffrage Victory" (1919)
- "Christmas Cheer to Fighters in France" (1919)
- "Mothers' Day in France" (1919)
- "Mother's Day in Training Camp and Trench" (1919)
- "Pulling Together in Philadelphia" (1919)
- "Our Boys in France" (1919)
- "National Prohibition Prominent Feature of Convention of National Conference of Social Work" (1919)
- "With the Sailor Lads at a Philadelphia White Ribobn Social" (1919)

=== Calendars ===
- Birthday Calendar of Suffrage Women (1906)
- Birthday Calendar of Temperance Women

=== Plays ===
- "Work for Enforcement Where You Are" (1919)
