= Mary Torrans Lathrap =

American poet

Mary Lathrap
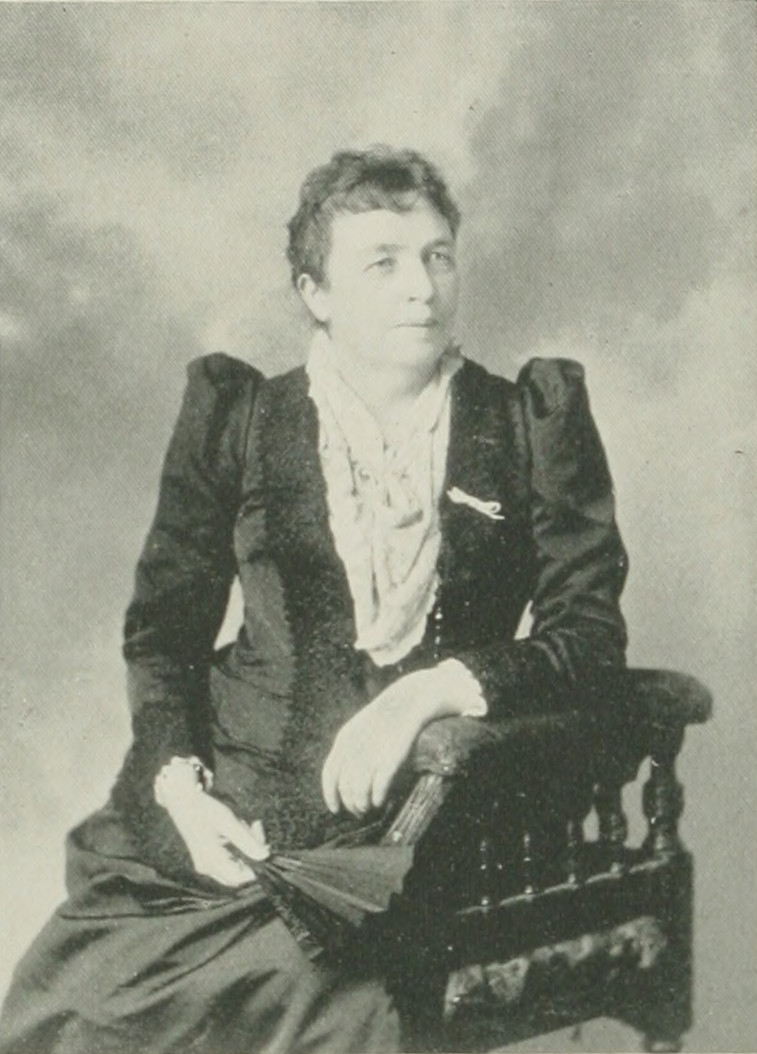
- Photo in A Woman of the Century
- Born: Mary Torrans; April 25, 1838; Jackson, Michigan, U.S.
- Died: January 3, 1895 (aged 56); Jackson, Michigan, U.S.
- Resting place: Mount Evergreen Cemetery, Jackson, Michigan
- Occupations: author; preacher; suffragist; social reformer
- Spouse: Carnett C. Lathrap (m. 1864)
- Writing career
- Pen name: Lena

Mary Lathrap (née Torrans; pen name, Lena; known as "The Daniel Webster of Prohibition"; April 25, 1838 - January 3, 1895) was a 19th-century American author, preacher, suffragist, and temperance reformer. For 20 years, she was identified with the progressive women of Michigan who had temperance, purity, and prohibition as their watchwords, and the white ribbon as their badge. She served as president of Michigan's Woman's Christian Temperance Union (1882), co-founded the state's suffrage organization (1870), and worked on the amendment campaign (1874). From 1871, Lathrap was a licensed preacher for the Methodist Episcopal Church.

== Early life and education ==
Mary Torrans was born on a farm near Jackson, Michigan, on April 25, 1838. Her parents were Scotch-Irish Presbyterians. Lathrap's childhood was passed in Marshall, where she was educated in the public schools. She was a literary child, and at the age of 14, contributed to local papers under the pen-name "Lena." She was converted in her tenth year, but did not join the church until she was nearly 18 years old.

== Career ==
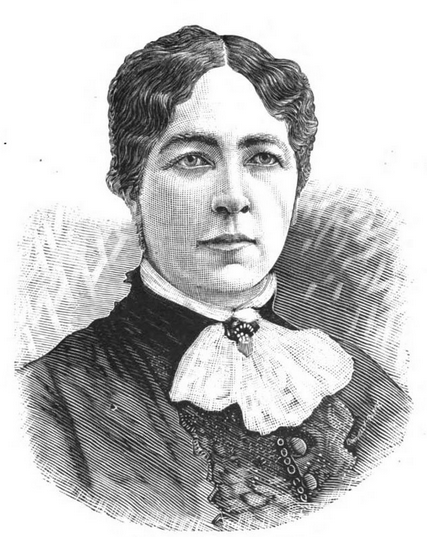
Lathrap before 1889

From 1862 to 1864, she taught in the Detroit public schools. In 1864, she married Carnett C. Lathrap, then assistant surgeon of the Ninth Michigan Cavalry. In 1865, they removed to Jackson. There, she joined the Methodist Episcopal Church, of which her husband was a member, and became a speaker in the church classrooms. In 1871, she was licensed to preach the gospel and began in the Congregational Church in Michigan Center. Her sermons aroused the people, and for years, she labored as an evangelist, many thousands being converted by her ministry.

She took an active part in the Women's Crusade, was a co-founder of the Woman's Christian Temperance Union, and served as president of the State union of Michigan from 1882. Her work was largely devoted to that organization for at least eight years. She labored in various States and was a strong helper in securing the scientific-instruction law, and in the Michigan, Nebraska and Dakota Territory amendment campaigns. In 1878, she secured the passage of a bill in the Michigan legislature appropriating US$30,000 for the establishment of the Girls' Industrial Home, a reformatory school, located in Adrian. She was a contributing editor The Union Signal. In 1890, she was a member of the Woman's Council in Washington, D.C.

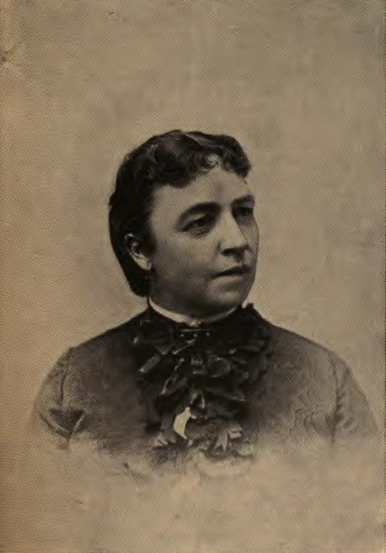
Lathrap in 1888

Her evangelistic and platform work consumed a major part of her life and effort, but her literary work was also important. Her poems were meritorious productions, and she wrote enough to fill a large volume. During the years of her great activity in evangelistic and temperance work, her literary impulses were overshadowed by the moral work in which she was engaged. Later in life, she wrote more. Her memorial odes to James A. Garfield and John Bartholomew Gough were widely quoted, as were also many other of her poems. Her lectures were always successful, and she was equally at home on the temperance platform, on the lecture platform, in the pulpit or at the author's desk. Her oratory caused her to be styled "The Daniel Webster of Prohibition," a name well-suited to her.

== Death ==
Mary Torrans Lathrap died January 3, 1895, aged 56.

== Selected works ==
- What means this stone? : a poem, 1891
- Lathrap is universally credited with writing the 1895 poem originally titled "Judge Softly". It features the iconic line:"Just walk a mile in his moccasins / Before you abuse, criticize and accuse."
- The poems and written addresses of Mary T. Lathrap with a short sketch of her life ..., 1895 (with Alphonso A Hopkins; Lewis Ransom Fiske; Henry Somerset, Lady; Julia R Parish; Frances E Willard)
- No uncertain sound : Mary T. Lathrap, selections from her most recent speeches : dead, but yet she speaks., 1895
- Rare gems from the literary works of Mary T. Lathrap : born April 25, 1838, died January 3, 1895. 1895 (with Julia R Parish)
