= Anna Riggs =

Anna Riggs may refer to:

- Anna, Lady Miller (1741–1781), née Riggs, English poet, travel writer, heiress and salon hostess
- Anna Rankin Riggs (1835–1908), American social reformer
- Anna Langford (1917–2008), née Riggs, American politician, civil rights activist, and lawyer
