= Clara C. Chapin =

British-born American suffragist, temperance worker

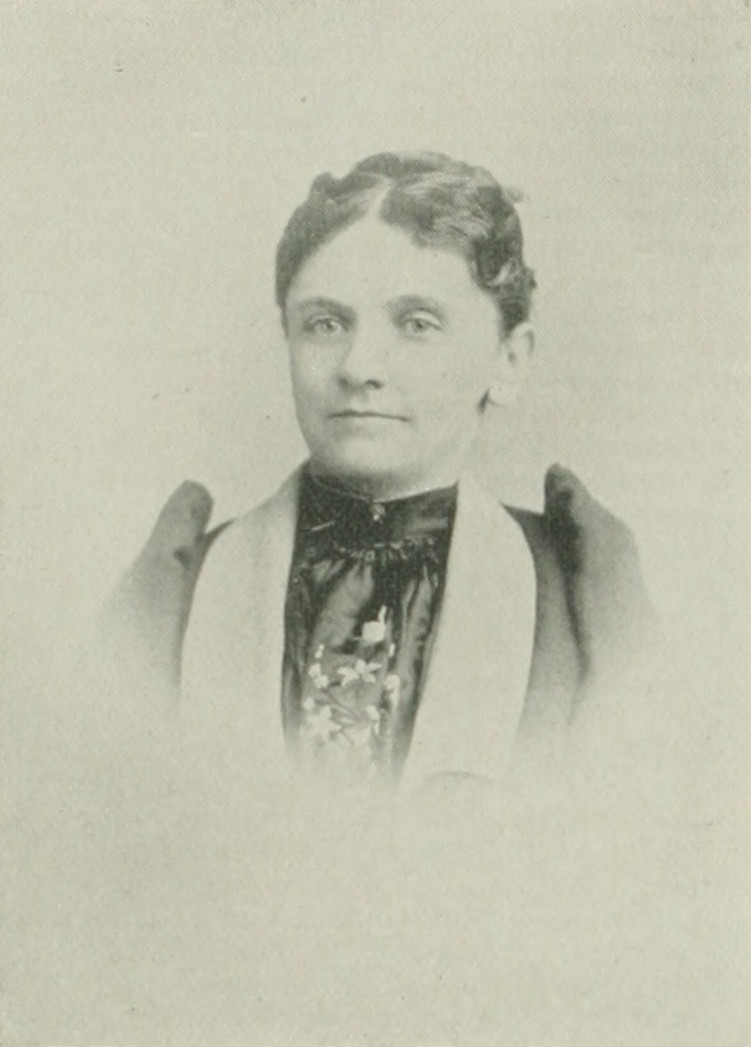
Portrait from A Woman of the Century

Clara Christiana Morgan Chapin (nicknames, Mom Chape and La Petite; pen name, Clara English; 1852 – 1926) was a British-born American woman suffragist, temperance worker, and newspaper editor.

== Early life and education ==
Clara Christiana Morgan was born in Gloucestershire, England, 26 December 1852. Her father was of Welsh origins, and her mother came of an old country family, the Blagdons, proprietors of the manor of Boddington since the days of William the Conqueror.

She was educated in Clifton Ladies' College and passed the Cambridge local examination, the only form of university privilege open at that time to girls. She came to the United States with her parents and their five younger children in 1870. The family settled in Fillmore County, Nebraska.

== Career ==
In Fillmore county, Chapin engaged in teaching. In September, 1872, she married Clarence C. Chapin, of Sheffield, Massachusetts, and shortly after, they removed to Franklin County, Nebraska, where both took a prominent part in the development of the new State of Nebraska. Mr. Chapin served as a member of the Nebraska State Legislature.

Mrs. Chapin, by the use of her pen and personal influence, aided in securing the enactment of the Slocum license law, at that time supposed to be the panacea in temperance matters. The couple also aided materially in securing the temperance educational and scientific law for that State. She was particularly interested in all movements for the advancement of women and took an active part in the woman suffrage campaign of 1882. She was a prominent member of the Woman's Christian Temperance Union and wrote much for the press on the woman and temperance questions. She served as editor of The Union Signal, an organ of the Woman's Temperance Publishing Association, from 1874. Chapin's used the pen name, "Clara English".

== Personal life ==
Being a small woman, Chapin commonly went by the name "La Petite" among her co-workers in Nebraska. For a time, she resided with her husband, son and two daughters in one of the suburban towns of Chicago, Illinois.

Clara Chapin spent the last five years of her life in South Pasadena, California where she died November 24, 1926.
