= Anna Adams Gordon =

American social reformer

Anna Gordon
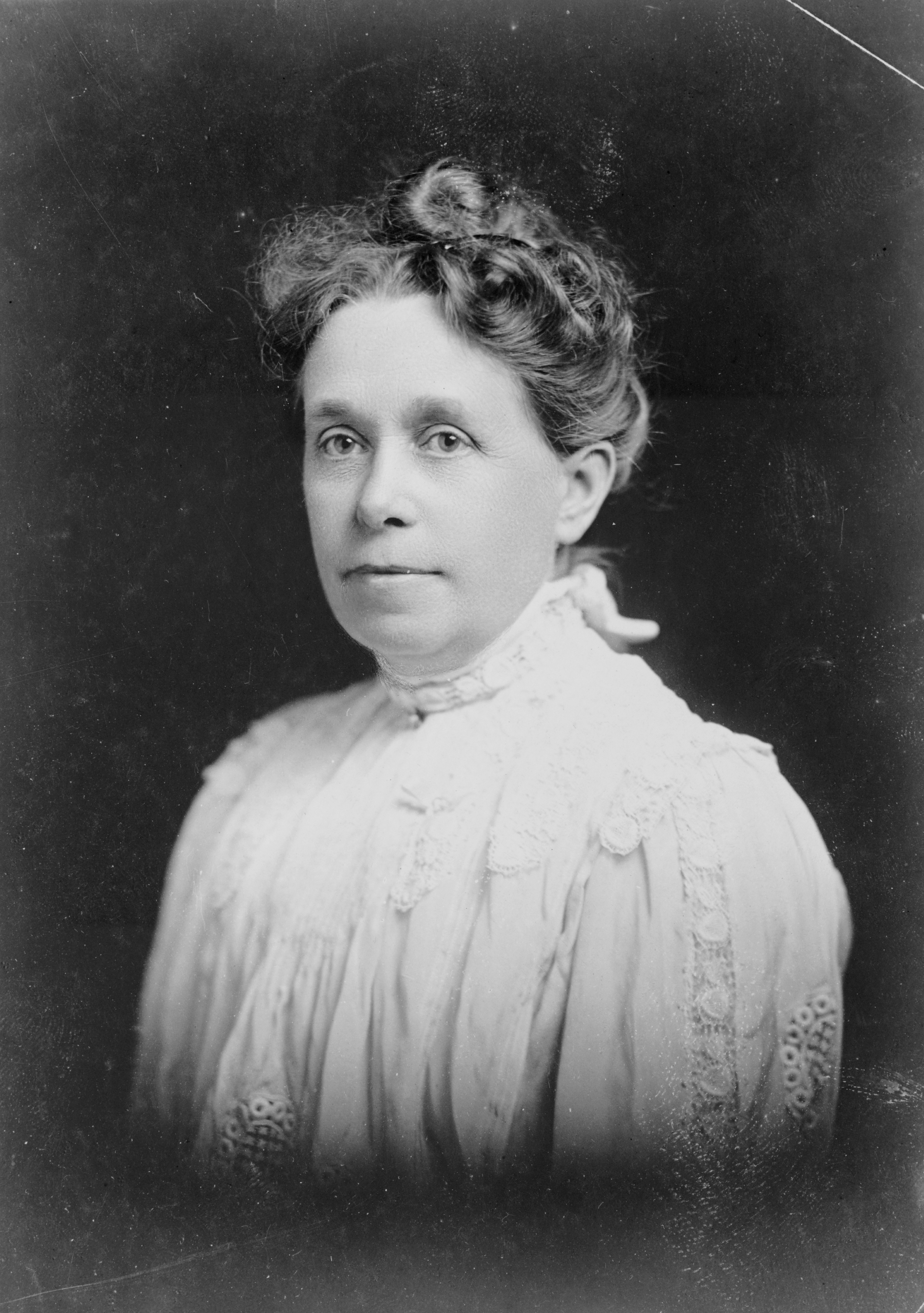
- Gordon c. 1910

4th President of the Woman's Christian Temperance Union
- In office 1914–1925
- Preceded by: Lillian Stevens
- Succeeded by: Ella Boole

Personal details
- Born: July 21, 1853 Boston, Massachusetts, United States
- Died: June 15, 1931 (aged 77) Castile, New York, United States
- Resting place: Mount Hope Cemetery, Massachusetts, United States
- Parent(s): James Gordon; Mary
- Education: Mount Holyoke College

Anna Adams Gordon (21 July 1853 – 15 June 1931) was an American social reformer, songwriter, and, as national president of the Woman's Christian Temperance Union when the Eighteenth Amendment was adopted, a major figure in the Temperance movement.

== Biography ==
=== Early life ===
Gordon was born on July 21, 1853, in Boston, Massachusetts, to James M. and Mary Clarkson Gordon, both Christian abolitionists. Her father had served as Treasurer on the American Board of Commissioners for Foreign Missions. When she was three, her family moved to Auburndale. Elizabeth Gordon was an older sibling.

She went on to attend Boston High School, Lasell Seminary, and Mount Holyoke College. She spent a year abroad in San Sebastián with another sister, Alice Gulick, who was a missionary and had started a school for girls there in 1871.

=== Woman's Christian Temperance Union ===
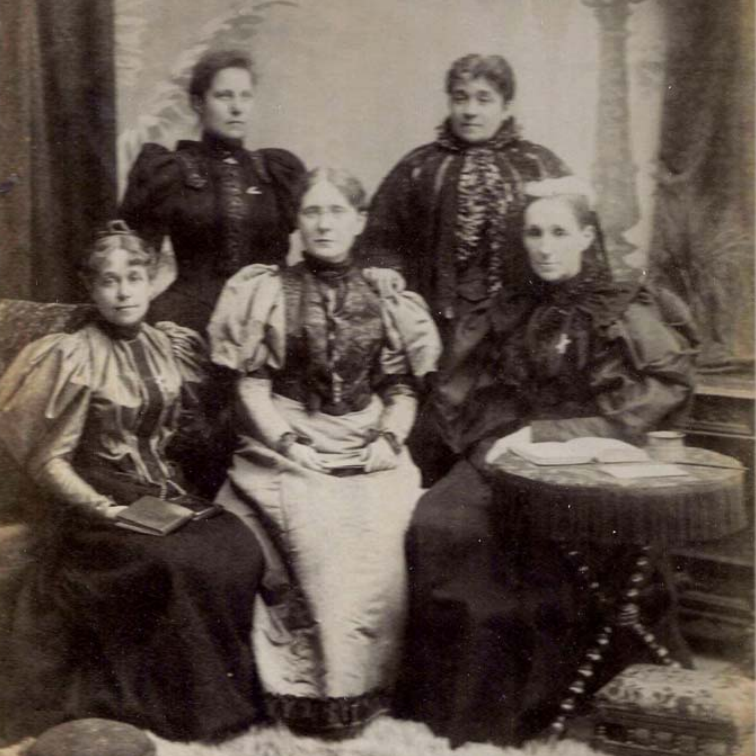
Temperance group in 1895, back left to right: Gordon, Mary E. Sanderson (front): Agnes Slack, Frances Willard, and Lady Henry Somerset

In 1877, Gordon met Frances Willard at a Dwight Moody revival meeting, in the building where Willard was holding temperance meetings. Gordon's younger brother Arthur had died just days before, a traumatic event which had, as Willard later wrote, driven Gordon "Godward". The organist was late to the meeting and Gordon took up playing for the occasion.

The two became close friends, with Gordon continuing to play organ for Willard's meetings. Gordon eventually moved into Willard's residence as her personal secretary. Willard credited Gordon for greatly assisting with the 1879 Home Protection campaign of Illinois, which secured more than 180,000 signatures in favor of temperance. In 1881, Gordon and Willard went south to organize WCTU chapters where women's political activity received even less support than in the north. Gordon subsequently followed her employer on her travels through the United States, Canada and Europe, spending a year in England, mostly as the guests of Lady Henry Somerset. In the over-a-decade the two women lived together, Gordon also helped to care for Willard's mother. Some scholars refer to Gordon as Willard's "lifelong companion."

Gordon and Willard remained close friends until Willard's death in 1898, at which time Lillian Stevens became president of the Woman's Christian Temperance Union, with Gordon as vice-president. That same year, Gordon also wrote a memorial biography of Willard (expanded and reprinted in 1905). Upon Lillian Stevens' death in 1914, Anna Adams Gordon became president of the WCTU until 1925. The WCTU's headquarters was moved to Willard's former home, and Gordon was instrumental in turning several rooms into a museum to Willard.

During the First World War, Gordon was instrumental in convincing U.S President Woodrow Wilson to harden the federal government's policies against the manufacture of alcoholic beverages, most notably by criminalizing the use of foodstuffs to make alcohol. Later, in 1919, temperance organizations scored a major victory with the ratification of the Eighteenth Amendment to the United States Constitution, which fully established prohibition in the United States. After this success, the WCTU under Gordon's guidance began to turn more towards temperance enforcement, and causes peripheral to the temperance movement, such as citizenship for immigrants, women's rights in the workplace, and child protection. In 1920, in campaigning to "help protect the woman worker," Gordon and the WTCU have been credited with early usage of the phrase "Equal Pay for Equal Work."

In November 1922, she was elected president of the World Women's Temperance Union (WWCTU), and resigned her presidency of the national WCTU organization.

She died on June 15, 1931, in Castile, New York.

== Works ==
During Gordon's career, she also became president of the World League Against Alcoholism, vice-president of the National Temperance Council, and vice-chairman of the Commission of Nineteen on the National Constitutional Prohibition Amendment. She was deeply involved in temperance work with the National Council of Women, the International Sunday-School Association, the World's Woman's Christian Temperance Union, the National Legislative Council, etc.

As a leader in the WCTU, Gordon was a staunch believer in the need to interest children in temperance at a very early age. To that end, she authored a number of books of stories, verse, and song aimed at children, as well as publications for adults. Sales of her books were said to have surpassed a million copies. Her temperance songs became especially successful and were translated into multiple languages. She was also the editor of The Union Signal, the news organ of the WCTU, and The Young Crusader, the newspaper of the Loyal Temperance Legion, the WCTU's children's branch.

Non-profit organization positions
| Preceded by Lillian Stevens | President of the Woman's Christian Temperance Union; 1914–1925 | Succeeded by Ella Boole |
