= The Union Signal =

American newspaper

- "Official organ of the National Woman's Christian Temperance Union"
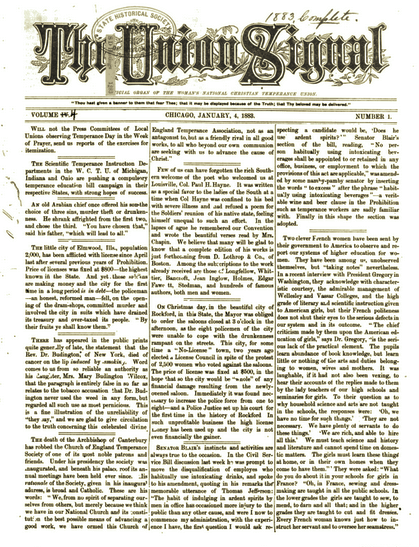
- The Union Signal (January 4, 1883)
- Type: Temperance movement in the United States
- Format: weekly, to bimonthly, to monthly, to quarterly
- Owner: National Woman's Christian Temperance Union
- Founded: 1874
- Ceased publication: 2016
- Language: English
- Headquarters: Chicago, Illinois, U.S.
- City: Chicago; Evanston, Illinois
- Country: United States
- ISSN: 0041-7033
- OCLC number: 1767985
- Website: theunionsignal.com

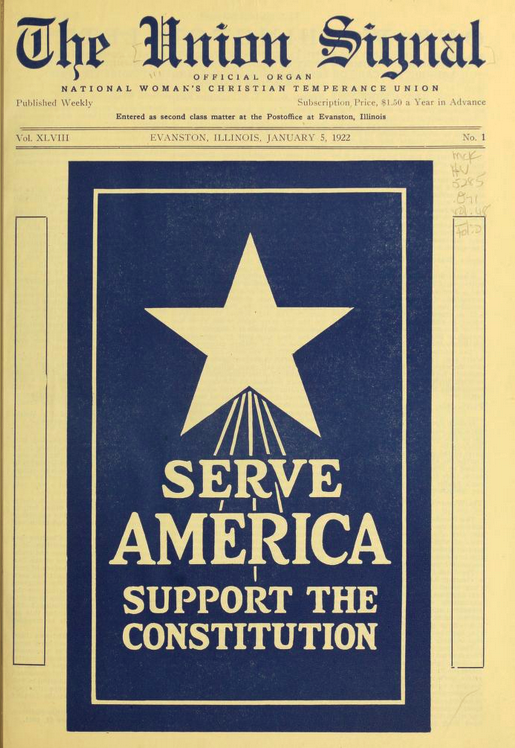
January 5, 1922

The Union Signal (formerly, The Woman's Temperance Union and Our Union) is a defunct American newspaper. It was the organ of the National Woman's Christian Temperance Union (National WCTU), at one time, the largest women's organization in the United States.

== History ==
Established in 1874 as The Woman's Temperance Union, it was later renamed in 1877 as Our Union.

When Our Union merged with another temperance paper, The Signal, in 1883, the organ's name was changed to The Union Signal.

Published in Chicago, Illinois, it focused on the women's temperance movement in the U.S. Initially, a weekly 16-page illustrated newspaper, it shifted location (Evanston, Illinois) and publishing schedule (to bi-monthly to monthly to quarterly) before it ceased publication in 2016.

The last edition of the National WCTU's quarterly journal, titled The Union Signal, was published in 2015, the main focus of which was current research and information on drugs.

== The Woman's Temperance Union ==
At the first annual convention of the National WCTU, held at Cleveland, Ohio, in 1874, a committee was appointed to consider the establishment of a paper as the organ of the union. This committee consisted of Annie Turner Wittenmyer, Pennsylvania; Susan J. Swift Steele, Wisconsin; Susan A. Gifford, Massachusetts; Elizabeth Eunice Smith Marcy, Illinois; Emma Janes, Oakland, California, and Mary Coffin Johnson, New York. Being unable to formulate definite plans before the close of the convention, the committee was given full power to act.

At the second annual convention, held at Cincinnati, Ohio, in 1875, Mrs. E. E. Marcy, secretary of the Committee on Publication Interests, reported that, after overcoming the various hindrances incident to such an enterprise, the project of publishing an official organ had been inaugurated the previous June at New York. The paper was called The Woman's Temperance Union, and six numbers had been issued up to the time of the convention. Wittenmyer, as chairman of the committee, was the active publisher, with Jennie Fowler Willing as editor and Johnson and Frances Willard as contributing editors. This report included resolutions drafted by the Committee on Publication Interests, one of which was as follows:—

Whereas, The paper published by the National Temperance Union as its organ is one of the strongest bonds to hold together our interests in separate localities, devoted as it is to our work,
Resolved, That we, as delegates, pledge ourselves a certain number of subscribers in our several states, and in case of failure, to raise money to cover the amount subscribed.

It was recorded that "much discussion followed", and an amendment was adopted eliminating the financial responsibility on the part of the states, but there was a generous pledging of subscriptions, Maine leading off with a pledge of US$100. Johnson became the publisher at this time, with Mary Towne Burt as her assistant, and, later, her successor.

Willing continued as editor until the third annual convention in Newark, New Jersey in 1876, when Margaret E. Winslow was elected editor, with Mrs. S. K. Bolton, Ohio; Mrs. Helen E. Brown, New York; Mary Torrans Lathrap, Michigan; Julia Colman, New York; Willing, Illinois; Johnson, New York, and Frances Willard, Illinois, as contributing editors.

== Our Union ==
In 1877, the name of the paper was changed to Our Union. In this year, at the fourth annual meeting of the National WCTU held in Chicago, the publisher's report showed an indebtedness on the paper. Frances Willard then moved that the secretary proceed to call the roll of the states, and the delegates respond and pledge the number of subscribers they would become responsible for the ensuing year. Pledges totalling 12,957 were received, and enthusiasm prevailed. Among the recommendations for the year's work was one relating to Our Union which read: "Each state will be expected to pledge itself, through its delegates, for a specified number of copies. Our local unions have come up nobly to the rescue, but we expect a largely increased enthusiasm in the year to come."

At the annual convention of 1878, held in Baltimore, the Publishing Committee reported that the paper had come through the year free from debt and with a small balance in the treasury. This report, signed by Frances Willard, Jane M. Geddes, Caroline Brown Buell, and Esther Pugh, closed with the following exhortation:— "We feel that, in the interests of Our Union, we must urge this Convention to impress upon the local auxiliaries that they have one National official organ, and one only; since there are other papers prominently circulated and largely subscribed for by temperance women, which are by many supposed to be equally entitled to their patronage, which, as our experience proves, interfere greatly with the circulation of Our Union. Having laid before our sisters such phases of the paper as the year's experience has developed we ask them to consider, prayerfully and with all due deliberation, their duty to a paper which is endeared to us as to them by long and earnest labors on its behalf."

== Consolidation ==
January 15, 1880, the first publication of the Woman's Temperance Publishing Association (Chicago) made its appearance. It was a 16-page weekly temperance paper, The Signal. Conceived by Matilda Carse, its editor and publisher was Mary Bannister Willard. It represented the W.C.T.U.'s rapidly growing work in western states. It was started in a most modest way, a desk room being secured in the rooms of the W.C.T.U. The paper from the first became a favorite. In a few weeks the circulation had so increased that a publisher had to be engaged. In November 1882, The Signal became the national organ of the W.C.T.U. when it was consolidated with Our Union, the monthly paper that had been the organ of the National Society for seven years.

In 1883, the new publication was renamed The Union Signal. Mary Bannister Willard retained her position when the consolidation was effected. The Union Signal made its first appearance January 4, 1883. For twenty years thereafter, the organ was owned and published by the Woman's Temperance Publishing Association of Chicago, which association had full control of the paper financially, while its editorial policy was controlled by the National WCTU. On October 10, 1903, the paper was bought outright by the National WCTU and thereafter was edited and published at Woman's Christian Temperance Union Administration Building in Evanston.

The thought and the hope of the early workers for this publication were hoped to inspire the women of future years. The keynote for that goal was sounded by Lillian M. N. Stevens, National WCTU President and editor-in-chief, at Los Angeles, California, 1905, when she said:— "I must insist that it is not too much to expect that each local union should maintain a subscription list equal in number to one fourth of its membership. Those unions which have reached this point are to be congratulated, not alone because they have conformed to this request, but because of the great uplift which must inevitably come to a local union and to a community through the liberal reading of The Union Signal."

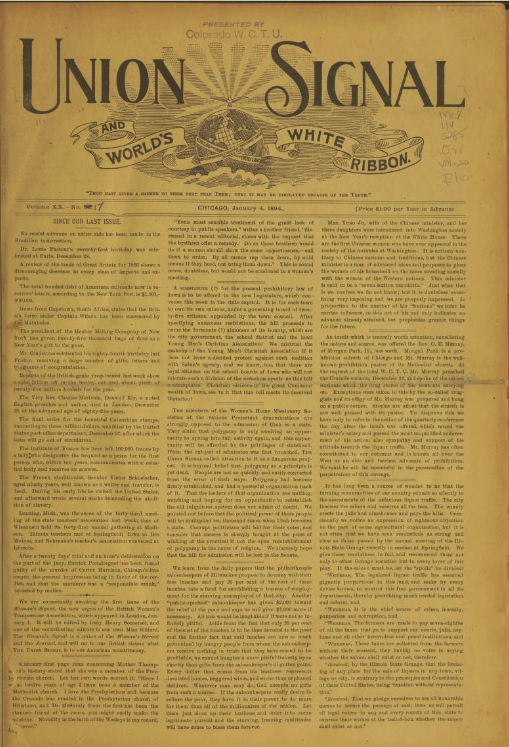
Union Signal (1894 January 4)

Not only did the paper's name change after the merger, at least in one year, 1894, it dropped the word "The" from its masthead, to read Union Signal.

== Motto ==
The paper's motto changed numerous times:

- 1883: Official organ of the Woman's National Christian Temperance Union.
- 1889 and 1890: Official organ of the World's and National Woman's Christian Temperance Union
- 1893, 1895, and 1898: And World's White Ribbon.
- 1903: For God And Home and Every Land. (upper left); National and World's Woman's Christian Temperance Union (upper right); And World's White Ribbon (lower center).
- 1910 and 1912: (no motto)
- 1913, 1914, 1915, 1917, 1921, and 1922: Official Organ National Woman's Christian Temperance Union

== Notable people ==
Editors have included: Mary Bannister Willard (January 1883 - July 1885), Mary Allen West (July 1885 - 1892), Frances Willard (1892 - February 1898), Lillian M. N. Stevens (February 1898 - April 1914), Anna Adams Gordon (April 1914 - October 1926), Ella Boole (October 1926 - October 1933), Ida B. Wise Smith (October 1933 - ).

=== Notable people and contributors ===
- Jessie Ackermann
- Ella Boole
- Caroline Brown Buell
- Adda Burch
- Mary Towne Burt
- Matilda Carse
- Clara Christiana Morgan Chapin
- Julia Colman
- Mary G. Charlton Edholm
- Anna Adams Gordon
- Eva Kinney Griffith
- Cornelia Templeton Hatcher
- Emeline Harriet Howe
- Therese A. Jenkins
- Mary Coffin Johnson
- Harriet B. Kells
- Mary Torrans Lathrap
- Mary Greenleaf Clement Leavitt
- Esther Pugh
- Anna Rankin Riggs
- Lillian M. N. Stevens
- Katharine Lent Stevenson
- Jane Agnes Stewart
- Missouri H. Stokes
- Margaret Ashmore Sudduth
- Delia L. Weatherby
- Mary Allen West
- Dora V. Wheelock
- Frances Willard
- Mary Bannister Willard
- Jennie Fowler Willing
- Margaret E. Winslow
- Ida B. Wise
- Annie Turner Wittenmyer
- Lenna Lowe Yost
