= Anna Rankin Riggs =

American social reformer (1835–1908)

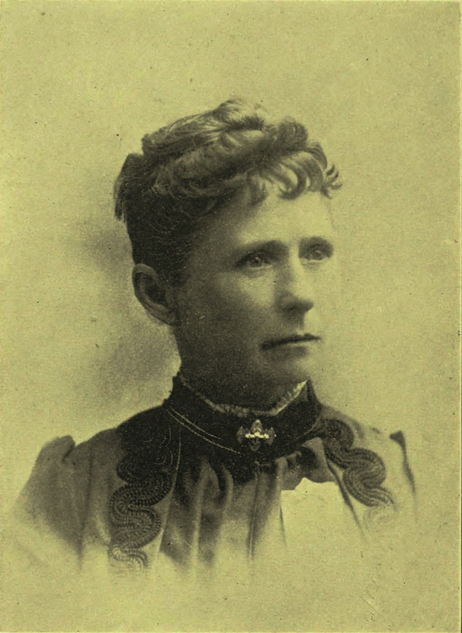
- "A Woman of the Century"
- Born: Nancy Anna Rankin; January 25, 1835; Cynthiana, Kentucky, U.S.
- Died: May 7, 1908; Butte, Montana, U.S.
- Occupation: social reformer
- Organization: Woman's Christian Temperance Union
- Notable work: Oregon White Ribbon
- Spouse: Henry M. Riggs (m. 1851; died 1904)

Anna Rankin Riggs (January 25, 1835 – May 7, 1908) was an American social reformer of the long nineteenth century. Active in the temperance movement, she began her work in Bloomington, Illinois, where she was one of early board of managers of The Union Signal and helped materially to lift it out of financial depression. Her principal area of activity, however, was in Portland, Oregon. Beginning in 1886, Riggs was almost continuously in office, serving as president of the Oregon Woman's Christian Temperance Union (WCTU). Having had experience in Illinois with serving on the board of managers of The Union Signal and helping to bring it out of financial depression, in 1891, she started the Oregon White Ribbon. Another prominent feature of her work in Oregon was a "school of methods" which proved an inspiration to the local WCTU unions in their department work. Eventually, she was bestowed the title of Honorary President of Oregon. Riggs also represented Oregon at conventions and was president of the International Chautauqua Association for the Pacific Northwest.

== Early life and education ==
Nancy Anna Rankin was born in Cynthiana, Kentucky, January 25, 1835. Richard Montgomery Rankin (1811–1855) and Louise W. (Eads) Rankin (1814–1866). Her siblings were Matilda, Marquis, Mary, Monroe, Priscilla, Norman, John, (infant), Katuria, Orvil, and Charles. Her parents removed to Illinois when she was two years old. Being the eldest of 12 children, Anna was her widowed mother's helper during the years that followed Mr. Rankin's death.

The education of the children was carried on at home, until each child could walk the long distance to the public school. At the age of 11, Anna began attending a distant school which offered a better education.

== Career ==
=== Illinois ===
In 1851, while still in her teens, she married Henry M. Riggs. When the Civil War broke out, Mr. Riggs went to the front with one of the many regiments from Illinois. His active service continued to the close of the war, and a captain's commission was the reward of his bravery. Mrs. Riggs spent those years with study, and in 1864, she spent eight months with her husband in field and camp in the southwestern department. Failing health forced her to return to Bloomington, Illinois, to resume her studies as her strength returned.

Eighteen years she lived in that city. Bloomington is the seat of the Illinois Wesleyan University, and when the woman's chair of English literature was created, Riggs aided in securing an endowment that made it perpetual in the institution. The young women's boarding-hall was one of the objects she worked on.

=== Oregon ===
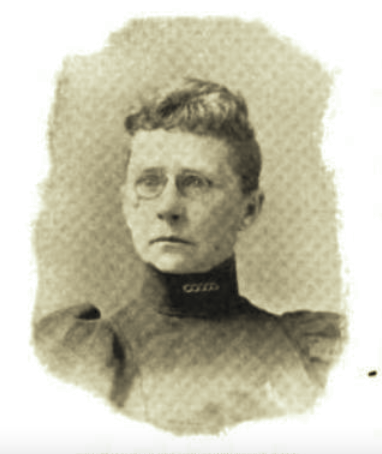
Anna R. Riggs

She left Bloomington for Oregon in the winter of 1882. When the temperance crusade swept over the country, she was watching by the bed of a dying sister. It was not until a later period she was free to join the white-ribbon army, in whose ranks she has won so many honors. When The Union Signal was struggling for existence, she was one of the board of managers, active in the successful efforts to make that periodical a leading journal.

When she first arrived in Portland, Oregon, it had no home for destitute women and girls. The office at the WCTU headquarters was so often appealed to by that in 1887 the Portland Union, under the auspices of Riggs and a few additional women, opened an industrial home. The institution was kept afloat by great effort, until it was merged into a refuge home and incorporated under the laws of the State. Twice, its president, Riggs, presented its claims to the legislature, and secured appropriations for its maintenance. She also started a fund to secure a permanent home for the institution.

In 1887, Riggs was elected president of the Oregon WCTU. In 1891, she started the Oregon White Ribbon, an eight-page, monthly periodical, serving as editor, along with Louisa A. Nash.

Another prominent feature of Riggs' work in Oregon was her school of methods, which became an inspiration to the local unions in their department work. In November 1891, she was a delegate to attend the World's and national WCTU conventions in Boston.

Riggs served as president of the International Chautauqua Association for the Northwest Coast.

== Personal life ==
On December 25, 1851, in McLean, Illinois, she married Henry M. Riggs (1829–1904). Mr. and Mrs. Riggs were childless, but they adopted three orphan children.

She resided in her brother's home on Portland Heights, Portland. She was a member of Grace Methodist Episcopal Church, where she served as a Sunday school teacher.

Anna Rankin Riggs died in Butte, Montana, May 7, 1908.

== Selected works ==
- "God's Thought of Woman" (1893)
