= Ida B. Wise =

American temperance activist (1871–1952)

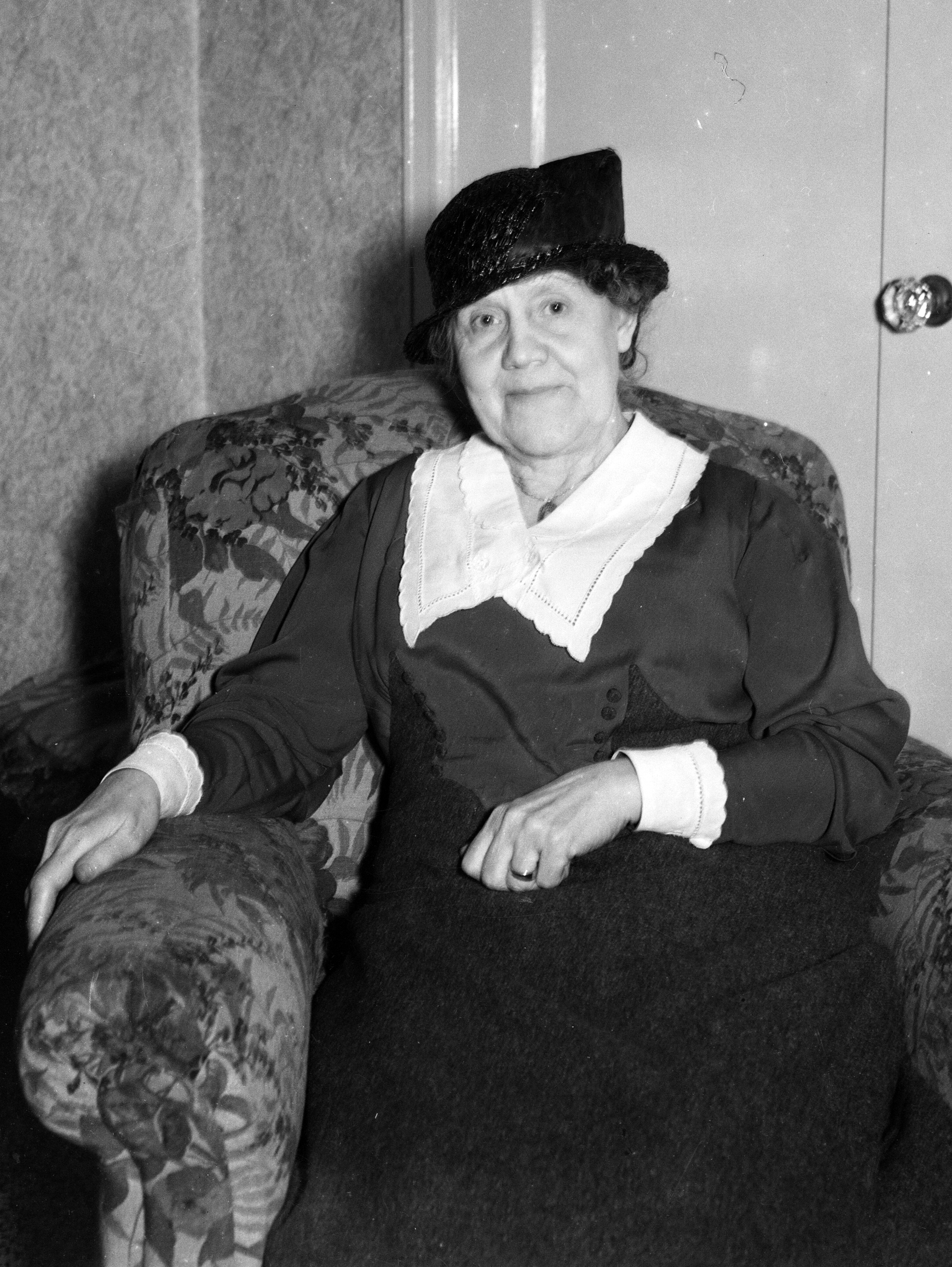
- Born: July 3, 1871; Philadelphia
- Died: February 16, 1952 (aged 80); Clarinda, Iowa
- Education: University of Nebraska
- Occupation: Temperance activist
- Spouses: James A. Wise (m. 1889; died 1892); Malcolm Smith (m. 1912)

Ida B. Wise (née Wise; after adoption, Speakman; after first marriage, Wise; after second marriage, Smith; July 3, 1871 – February 16, 1952) was an American temperance activist, best known as the primary author of the Sheppard Bill in 1916 that imposed prohibition on Washington, D.C. She was a member of the Disciples of Christ, and was ordained as a minister, but she never served as a pastor to a congregation. She served as president of the Iowa Woman's Christian Temperance Union (WCTU) before being elected president of the national WCTU.

== Early years and education ==
Ida Belle Wise was born in Philadelphia and raised in Hamburg, Iowa. After her father's death and mother's remarriage, she was adopted by her stepfather and took the surname Speakman.

She graduated from the University of Nebraska.

== Career ==
After completing her education, she taught for fourteen years. Wise joined the WCTU in 1891. By 1900, she was a district president in the Iowa WCTU. In 1913, she became president of the Iowa WCTU. She served as president of the Iowa WCTU for 20 years In 1930 before becoming president of the national WCTU.

President Herbert Hoover appointed her to the White House Conference on Child Health and Protection. In 1940, Wise was appointed by President Franklin Roosevelt to the White House Conference on Children in a Democracy.

Wise married twice. In 1889, she married James A. Wise. The couple had one son who lived to adulthood. After the death of her first husband in 1892, Wise married Malcolm Smith in 1912. She is known as both Ida B. Wise and Ida B. Wise Smith.

A member of the Disciples of Christ, Wise taught Sunday school from the age of 12. In 1923, she was ordained as a minister, but she never served as a pastor to a congregation.

Although Wise's primary cause was temperance, she also supported women's suffrage and child welfare work. Beginning in 1933, she served as editor-in-chief of National WCTU's The Union Signal. She was a semi-vegetarian.

Wise was inducted into the Iowa Women's Hall of Fame in 1977.
