= Frances Willard House (Evanston, Illinois) =

Historic house in Illinois, United States

- U.S. National Register of Historic Places
- U.S. National Historic Landmark
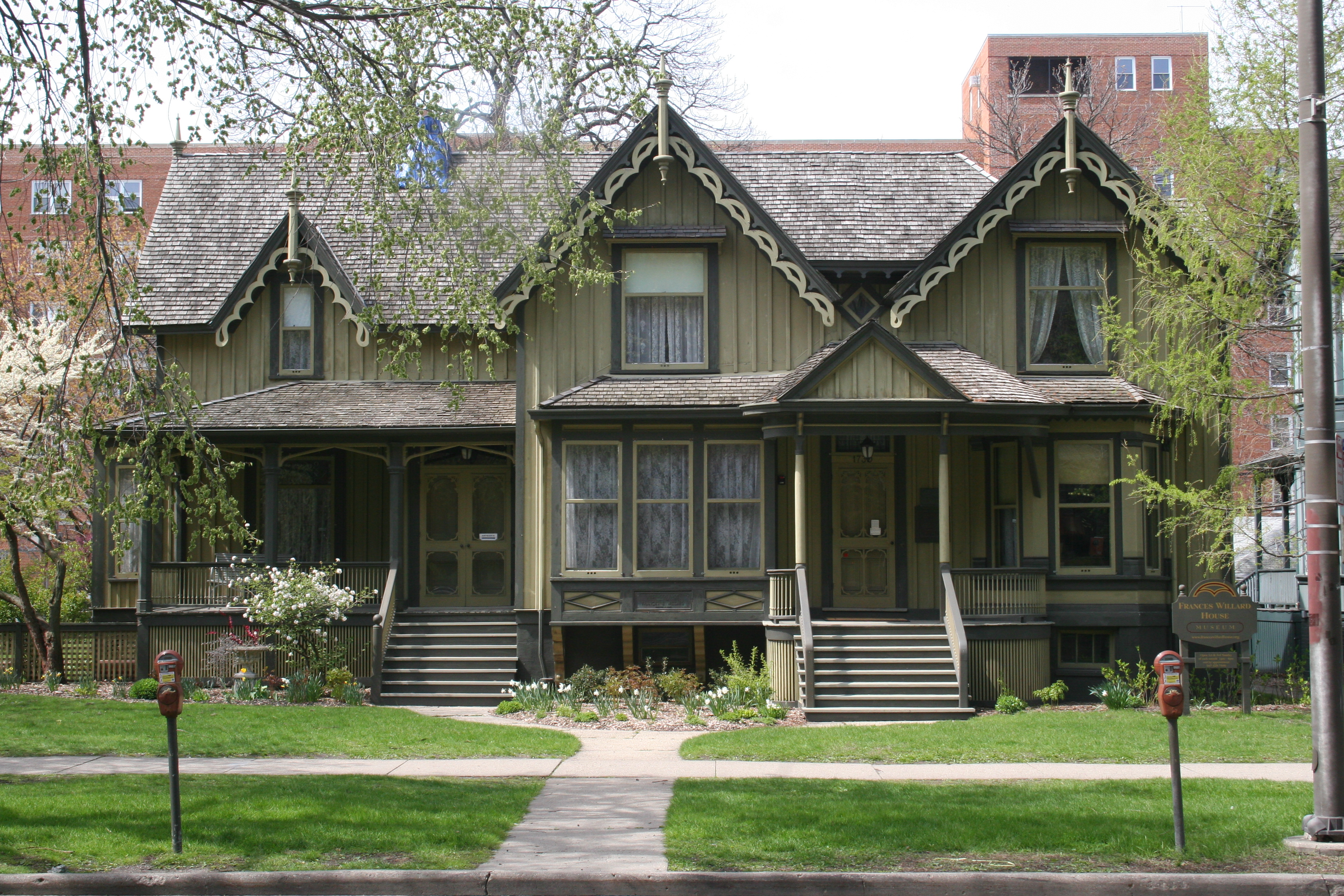
- Frances Willard House

- Location within Illinois Location within the United States
- Location: 1730 Chicago Avenue, Evanston, Illinois
- Coordinates: 42°2′53.93″N 87°40′45.17″W
- Built by: Josiah Willard
- Architectural style: Carpenter Gothic
- NRHP reference No.: 66000318

Significant dates
- Added to NRHP: October 15, 1966
- Designated NHL: June 23, 1965

The Frances Willard House is a historic house museum at 1730 Chicago Avenue in Evanston, Illinois, United States. Built in 1865, it was the home of Frances Willard (1839-1898) and her family, with the adjacent building serving as the longtime headquarters of the Woman's Christian Temperance Union (WCTU). Willard called the house Rest Cottage because it became a place for her to rest in between her tours and WCTU activities. It is owned by the National WCTU and is a National Historic Landmark.

== History ==
Frances Willard was born in 1839 in Churchville, New York. When she was two, her family moved to Oberlin, Ohio, a town recently founded by ministers who wanted to build a community with strong Christian morals. When she was 18, Willard moved with her family to Evanston, Illinois, to attend the Northwestern Female College. She spent the next sixteen years of her life as an educator at a variety of institutions across the county. In 1865, her father Josiah, who stayed in Evanston, built a house, which remains as the southern portion of the current structure. Frances Willard returned to Evanston and moved in with her father in 1871 when she accepted a position as Dean of the Women's College at Northwestern. Unhappy with the role of women at the university, and frequently at odds with University President Charles Henry Fowler, Willard resigned three years later.

Willard's resignation prompted a change in her life. She resumed her position as a travelling educator, but began to focus on the study of temperance. In the summer of 1874, Willard travelled around the East Coast to meet with other temperance advocates. She also became a noted public speaker on the virtue. Returning to Evanston, she helped to found the Woman's Christian Temperance Union (WCTU) and was elected its first corresponding secretary and first president of the Chicago chapter.

Her brother Oliver died in 1878, and Frances decided to expand her Evanston home that April to accommodate his widow and four children. The next year, she was elected President of the WCTU. After her brother's family moved to Germany, Willard began to rent out the northern section of her house to friends and fellow WCTU members. This section soon became used as an informal headquarters for the WCTU under Willard. Willard died in 1898 and left the entire house to the WCTU in her will. Two years later, the WCTU made the house in Evanston its national headquarters. The WCTU also made the house into a museum dedicated to Willard in that year. In 1910, the organization built the Literature Building in the rear of the property.

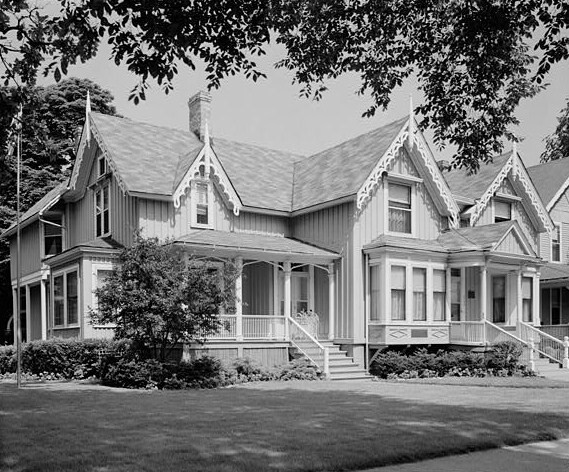
The Willard House in 1967

On June 23, 1965, the house was declared a National Historic Landmark by the National Park Service. When the National Register of Historic Places was founded a year later, it was automatically listed. It was surveyed by the Historic American Buildings Survey in 1967. Museum tours are now offered to the public on the first and third Sundays of every month.

== Architecture ==
The original 1865 house was probably based on a pattern book. It was an L-shaped building with vertical board and batten siding. The 1878 addition was consistent with the architectural form of the house but greatly expanded it. Proceeds from the sale of Willard's autobiography were used to add large bay windows on the main facade around 1890. Willard made another addition in 1893.

The two-story house is in the Carpenter Gothic style. It is painted pearl grey and has white trim. The front of the house has two columned porches. Three small porches lead to other entrances, and the second floor has a balcony on the rear. The three gables on the main facade have decorative trim and a turned finial in the center. There are seventeen rooms in the house, most with oak and walnut flooring.

== See also ==
- List of National Historic Landmarks in Illinois
- National Register of Historic Places listings in Cook County, Illinois
