= Woman's Christian Temperance Union Administration Building =

- U.S. National Register of Historic Places
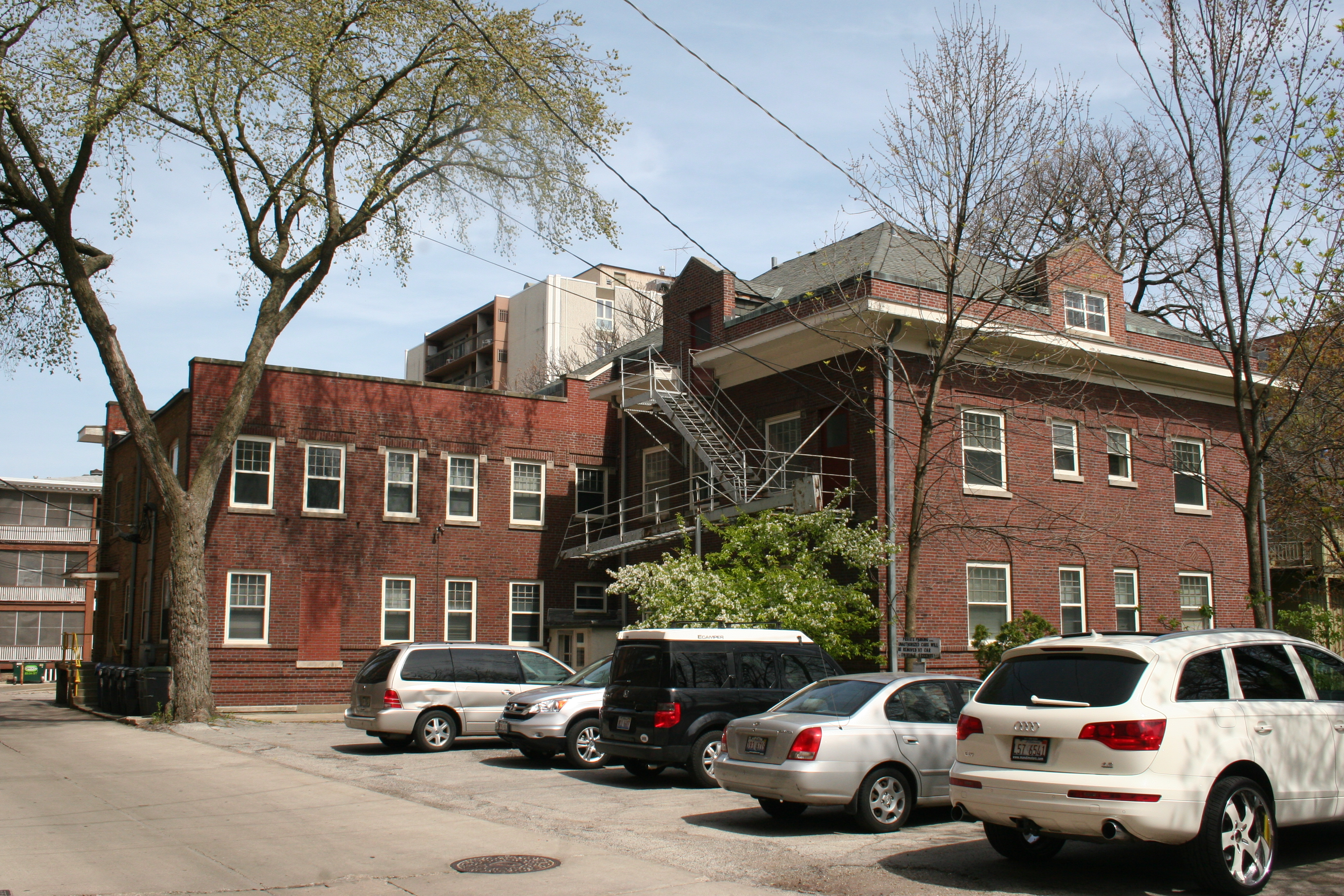

- Location within Illinois Location within the United States
- Location: 1730R Chicago Ave., Evanston, Illinois
- Coordinates: 42°2′56″N 87°40′45″W
- Area: less than one acre
- Built: 1910
- Architect: Charles R. Ayers, Earl H. Reed
- Architectural style: Colonial Revival
- NRHP reference No.: 02000849
- Added to NRHP: August 13, 2002

The Woman's Christian Temperance Union Administration Building is a historic building in Evanston, Illinois, United States. It has served as the publishing house and national headquarters of the Woman's Christian Temperance Union since its construction in 1910. The organization had an important role in the national discussion on prohibition and women's suffrage.

== History ==
The Woman's Christian Temperance Union (WCTU) was founded in Ohio in November 1874. It became the largest women's organization in the United States. Under president Annie Turner Wittenmyer, the WCTU organized national campaigns to advocate for temperance. These steps focused on literature publication, including a weekly newspaper dedicated to the cause.

Evanston, Illinois resident Frances Willard became the organization's second president in 1879. Willard used her home in Evanston as an informal headquarters for the organization. Many of its rooms were converted into office and dormitory space for WCTU officials. Here, the WCTU began to expand to other causes, including child welfare, labor reform, prison reform, women's suffrage, age of consent laws, and abstinence. The WCTU moved into an official headquarters building in Chicago, designed by Burnham & Root, in 1890.

Evanston had a lengthy history with temperance. The town was founded by Methodists seeking to build a university; Northwestern University opened in 1855. When Evanston was incorporated in 1863, its first act was to create an ordinance banning alcohol within a 4-mile (6.4 km) radius around the school. Because so many Evanston residents worked at the university, the act was popular. As Evanston grew to be considered an idyllic suburb in the 1870s, residents supported alcohol control as a way to preserve the residential climate. The first temperance organization in town, the Temperance Alliance, was founded around 1872. After Frances Willard returned from an east coast trip to meet with temperance leaders, she became a local leader in the movement.

Willard died in 1898 and left her house to the WCTU in her will. In 1900, the WCTU left Chicago and officially moved to Evanston. An addition was constructed on Willard's former house in 1904 to print The Union Signal and The Young Crusader. After almost a decade in Willard's former house, the organization decided that it needed a new building to suit its needs. The WCTU Printing House, also known as the Literature Building, was built in the rear of the Willard property. The new printing capabilities allowed the WCTU to increase their efforts. In 1913, the WCTU teamed up with the Anti-Saloon League and the Prohibition Party to focus their efforts on legislative prohibition. A 1915 fundraiser raised enough money to create an addition to the building, allowing it to hold more administrative offices. As a result, the building was renamed the Woman's Christian Temperance Union Administration Building.

In 1919, the WCTU's efforts came to fruition with the passage of the Eighteenth Amendment to the United States Constitution establishing prohibition. The Nineteenth Amendment followed the next year, approving women's suffrage. During prohibition, the WCTU harshly criticized the government for lax enforcement of the Volstead Act. Although prohibition was repealed in 1933, the WCTU continued to prosper. They continued to encourage individuals to abstain from alcohol and promoted local prohibition ordinances. A memorial library addition commemorated to Willard was constructed in 1938. By 1943, the WCTU was the largest temperance organization in the nation; by 1951, it had over a quarter of a million members. The WCTU continues to use the administration building as its national headquarters.
