= Lillian M. N. Stevens =

American temperance worker (1843–1914)

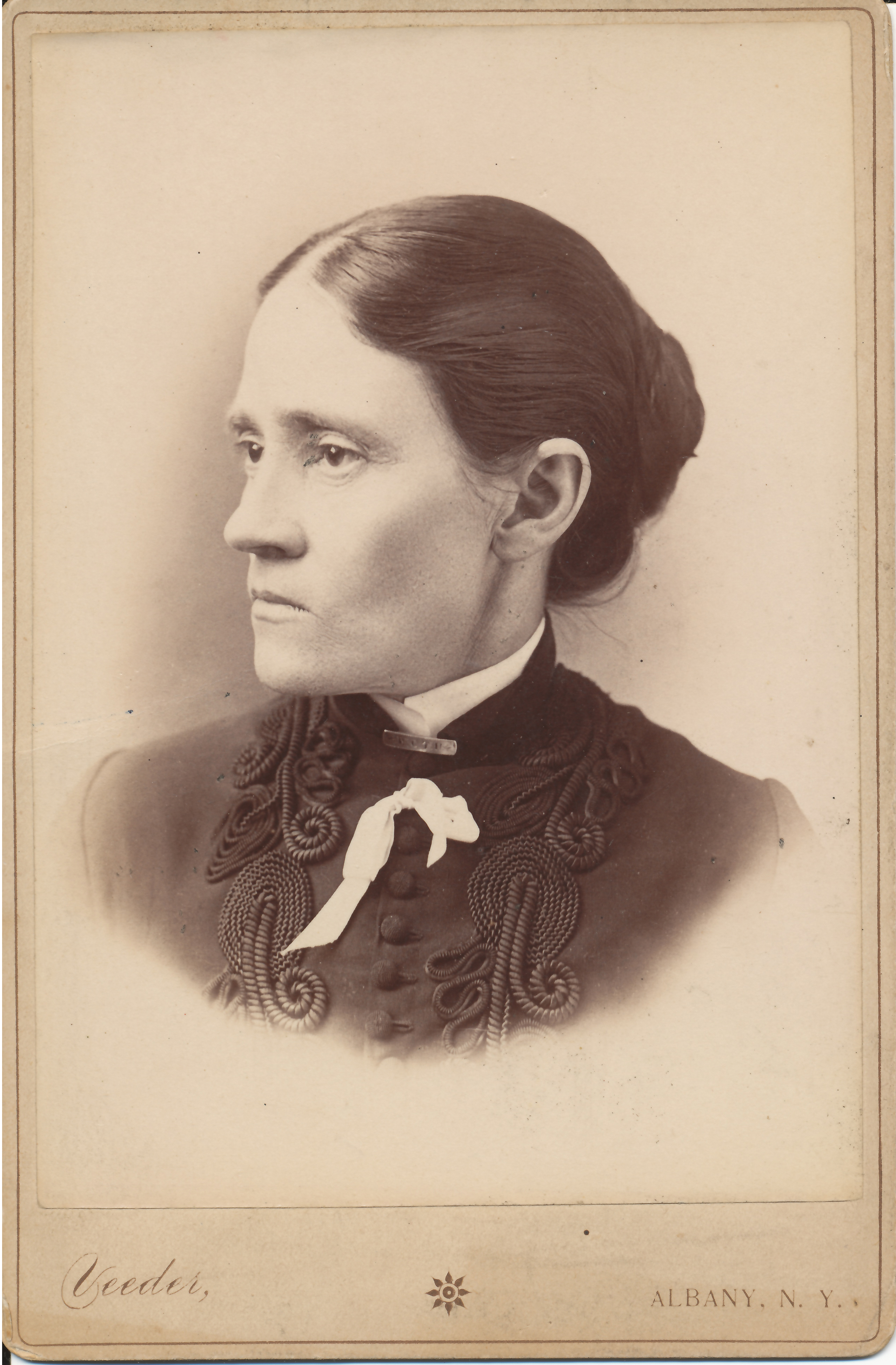
- Portrait by Aaron Veeder, Albany NY

President of the Woman's Christian Temperance Union (W.C.T.U.)
- In office 1898–1914
- Preceded by: Frances E. Willard
- Succeeded by: Anna Adams Gordon

Personal details
- Born: Marilla N. Ames; March 1, 1843 Dover, Maine, US
- Died: April 6, 1914 (aged 71) Portland, Maine, US
- Spouse: Michael Stevens
- Children: 1
- Education: Westbrook Seminary
- Profession: teacher

Lillian M. N. Stevens (1843–1914) was an American temperance worker and social reformer, born at Dover, Maine. She helped launch the Maine chapter of the Woman's Christian Temperance Union (W.C.T.U.), served as its president, and was elected president of the National W.C.T.U. after the death of Frances Willard. Stevens also served as Editor-in-chief of the W.C.T.U.'s organ, The Union Signal.

== Biography ==
=== Childhood in Maine ===
Lillian, known as "Marilla" in childhood, was the fourth of six children born in Dover, Maine to Nathaniel Ames and Nancy Fowler Parsons Ames. Two of her older siblings died in infancy, leaving one boy and three girls. As a child, "she loved the woods, quiet haunts, a free life and plenty of books." The four siblings "spent many happy hours on the hillside and in the woods where she delighted to be. . . . [S]he came to love the stately pines better than any flower, or shrub, or other tree." Her father was a teacher, and both parents shared early New England ancestry. She studied, first, at the Foxcroft Academy, founded by the state in 1823 "for the promotion of literature, science, morality and piety." Her mother died when Lillian was 14. In January 1859 her father married Frances L. Bragdon, a resident of Cape Elizabeth. Lillian's new home provided easy access to the Westbrook Seminary, which she entered for the spring term two months later.

=== Education and career ===
Lillian Ames was 16 years old when her father died of consumption. At about that time she began to teach school. She was hired at the Spruce Street School outside Portland, and then by the Stroudwater School. Lillian Ames was said to be one of the earliest Maine women to continue teaching during a winter season, customarily restricted to male teachers. After teaching for several years she decided to marry, a status in those days judged incompatible with a woman's teaching. In 1911 she was awarded an honorary degree of A.M. from Bates College.

=== Marriage and family ===
Lillian Ames married Michael Stevens of Portland, Maine, on October 17, 1865, at Meadville, Pennsylvania. Michael Stevens was about 10 years older than Lillian and was a salt and grain wholesaler. He had been raised in a large brick home in Stroudwater, built in 1803 by his father, Tristram Stevens, and would eventually move his own family into his childhood home.

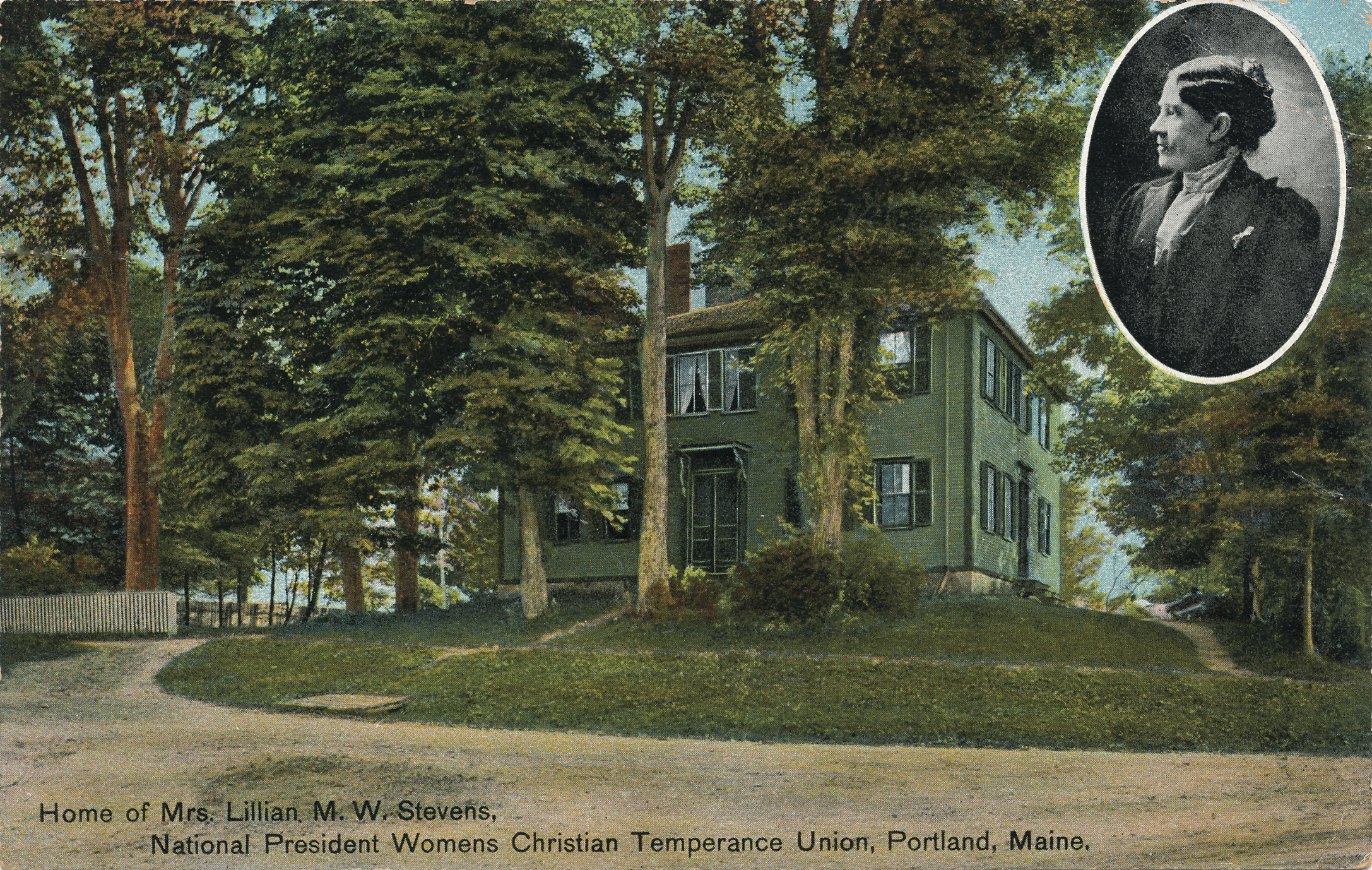
Home of Mrs. Lillian M. N. Stevens, Portland, Maine

Michael and Lillian Stevens gave birth to a daughter, Gertrude Mary, born 14 March 1867. In Lillian Steven's later work, Michael Stevens became a partner and ally, described as "ready to sympathize with the ideas of social reform" and to support "her ideas regarding the extension of the suffrage to women." In 1899, he was given honorary life membership in the Maine W.C.T.U.

== The temperance movement ==
In 1874, Stevens was in her early 30s and raising a seven-year-old daughter. As a resident of Cumberland County, her region had founded a local temperance society over forty years earlier. Francis Murphy announced a temperance camp meeting for September, 1874 at Old Orchard Beach, near Portland, Maine. Lillian Stevens learned that Frances Willard was scheduled to speak at the camp meeting, and eagerly joined the group, bringing her young daughter with her. Lillian Stevens met Frances Willard at this meeting. In her daughter's words, "These two women were drawn to one another and thus began a friendship enduring through the years." The National WCTU was organized at Cleveland, Ohio in 1874. In 1875, Maine followed with the Woman's Christian Temperance Union of Maine, formed at Old Orchard Beach.

=== Leadership ===
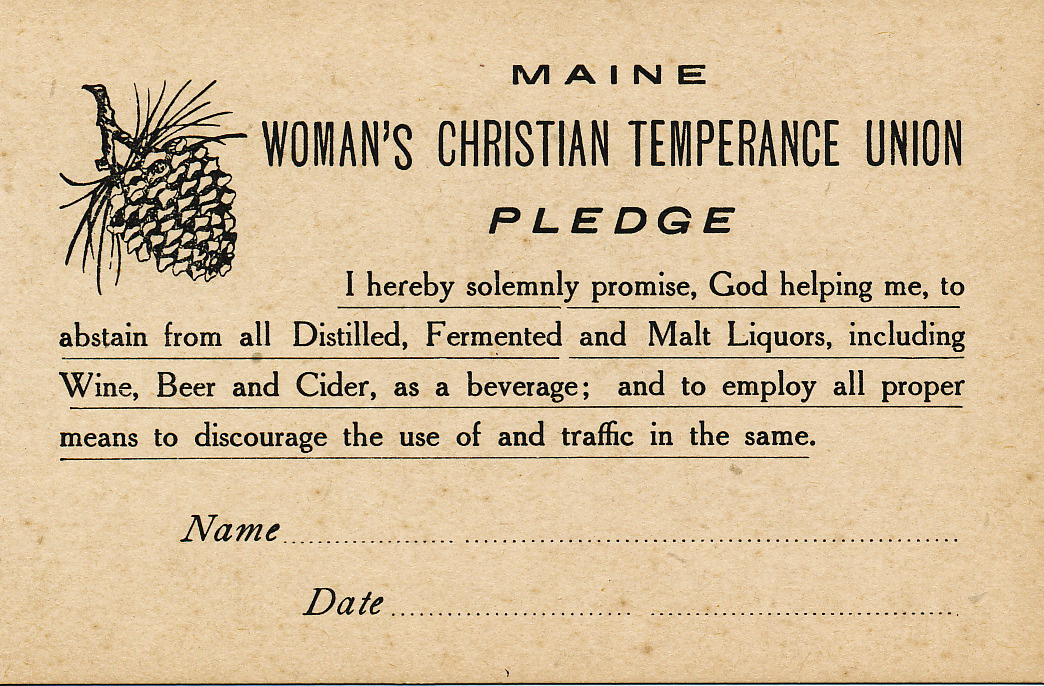
Maine W.C.T.U. pledge card.

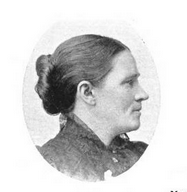
Lillian M. N. Stevens (1894)

Stevens was described as possessing "great executive ability and [being] a convincing speaker." Her name was visible in the earliest days of women's temperance work in Maine, and she became treasurer of the Maine Woman's Christian Temperance Union at its founding. She served as treasurer until her election as its president in 1878, continuing as its president the rest of her life. Stevens participated in the National W.C.T.U. conventions from 1876, becoming, sequentially, assistant recording secretary (1880), recording secretary (1893), and vice president at large (1894). Following the death of Frances Willard, Lillian Stevens was elected president of the National W.C.T.U., serving 16 years before her own death. During her term, she grappled with issues such as the potential ownership issue of the National W.C.T.U. headquarters, Temperance Temple.

In 1900, she was elected vice president at large of the World W.C.T.U. In this capacity she presided over four international conventions, including ones held at Geneva, Switzerland (1903), Boston, Massachusetts (1906), Glasgow, Scotland (1910), and Brooklyn, New York (1912).

=== Accomplishments ===
Working alongside Neal Dow, Lillian Stevens was recognized as a skilled organizer in 1884 when she helped to insert prohibition into the Maine State Constitution. Under her national presidency, membership continued to swell, and one thousand temperance unions were organized in one year (1900). She helped to raise the age for protection of girls to 16 and to add scientific temperance instruction to the schools.

== Public service ==
Stevens lived her life as a humanitarian. According to her daughter, "all she did for humanity she did in the name of humanity's Christ." Frances Willard and Mary Livermore summarized her character and manner as follows:

As a philanthropist she labors in a quiet way doing a work known to comparatively few, yet none the less noble. She is known and loved by many hearts in the lower as well as in the higher walks of life. Her justice is always tempered with mercy, and no one who appeals to her for assistance is ever turned away empty handed.

=== Temporary Home for Women and Children ===
By 1881, Stevens had worked with W.C.T.U. members in Portland to establish the Temporary Home for Women and Children. It was viewed as "a temporary home for those who desire to begin anew in an upright life . . .in a place free from evil associations and away from old temptations." By the early 1900s, it was run by a private corporation and targeted "unfortunate girls, discharged prisoners, and homeless women and children."

=== Maine Industrial School for Girls ===
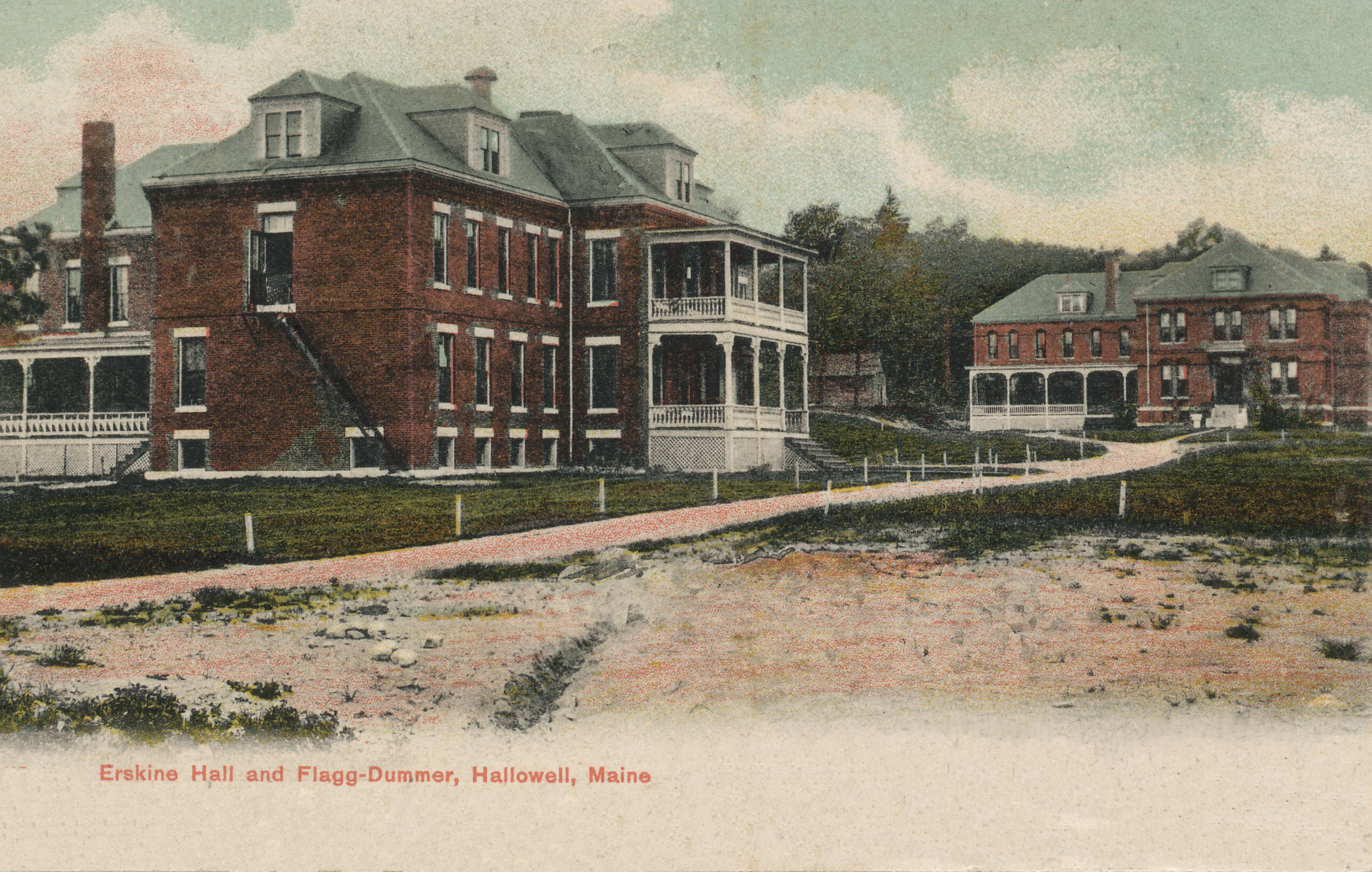
Industrial School for Girls, Hallowell, Maine

Lillian Stevens was a staunch supporter of the Maine Industrial School for Girls, established in 1873. She was first appointed one of five (later six) trustees in 1885.

. . .designed as a refuge for girls between the ages of seven and fifteen years, who, by force of circumstances or associations, are in manifest danger of becoming outcasts of society. It is not a place of punishment, to which its inmates are sent as criminals by criminal process-- but a home for the friendless, neglected and vagrant children of the State, where under the genial influences of kind treatment and physical and moral training, they may be won back to ways of virtue and respectability, and fitted for positions of honorable self support and lives of usefulness.

=== National Conference of Charities and Corrections ===
Stevens was corresponding secretary representing Maine for the National Conference of Charities and Correction. Begun under the American Social Science Association, in 1879 the organization changed its name to the National Conference of Charities and Correction, a name it bore for nearly forty years. "By 1880 the number of members had grown to over 125, most of whom were representatives of public institutions or agencies and delegates of private bodies." In the 1888 conference at Baltimore, the issue of women police matrons came up. Lillian Stevens reported: "As a Maine woman I take great pride in saying that the first police matron in this country was appointed in Portland." Stevens served on the standing committee on the Co-operation of Women in the Management of Charitable Reformatory and Penal Institutions.

=== National Council of Women ===
The National Council of Women of the United States and the International Council of Women were organizations that aimed to unite all women's organizations and groups to promote the status of women. "[S]incerely believing that the best good of our homes and nation will be advanced by our own greater unity of thought, sympathy, and that an organized movement of women will best conserve the highest good of the family and the state. . . ." They were formed in 1888 at Washington, DC. Stevens was active in the national branch, where she assumed the role of treasurer in 1891 and in 1895 joined its newly formed cabinet as Secretary of the Department of Moral Reform. In 1896, Hannah Bailey and Lillian Stevens advanced the motion for the American group to formally join the International Council of Women.

=== The World's Congress of Representative Women ===
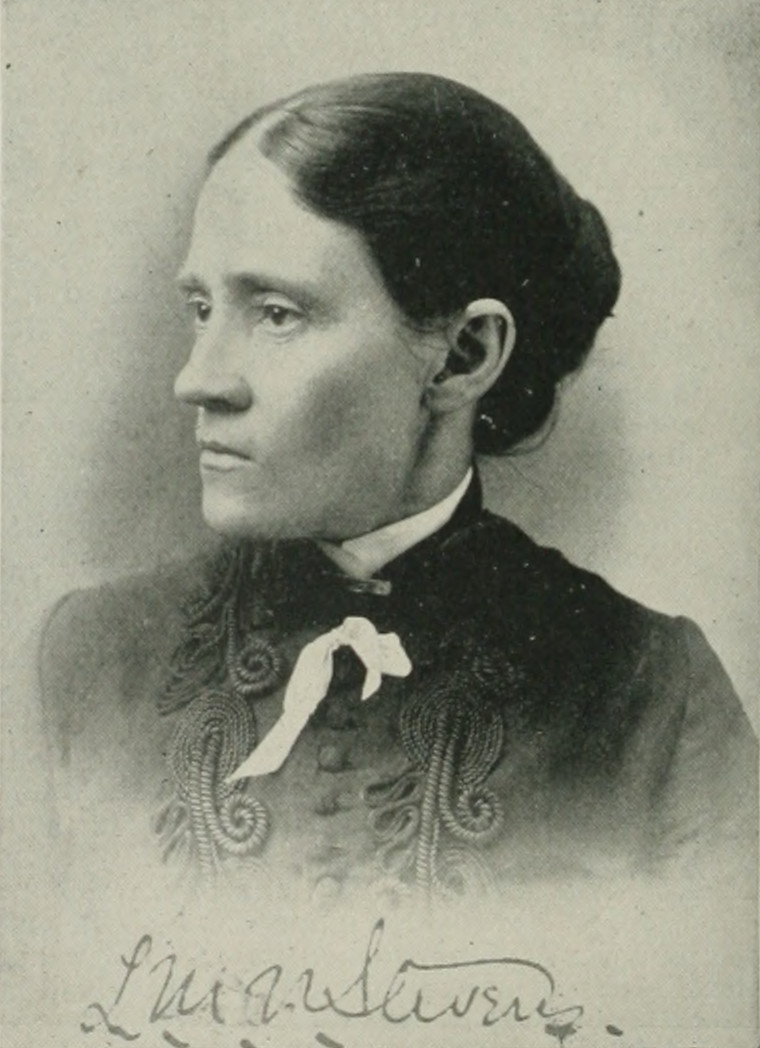
Lilliam M. N. Stevens (1893)

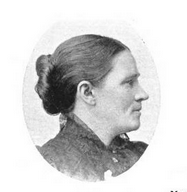
Lillian M. N. Stevens

Stevens was invited to participate in "The World's Congress of Representative Women," convened at the 1893 Columbia Exposition at Chicago." Its purpose was to "[present] to the people of the world the wonderful progress of women in all civilized lands in the great departments of intellectual activity." Stevens chaired the committee on "Philanthropy and Charity," as well as being a member of the Home Advisory Council.

Following the international crisis in Armenia, temperance workers were encouraged by Frances Willard to shelter Armenians fleeing from the Turks. Stevens made arrangements to house 50 refugees in Portland.

== Tributes ==
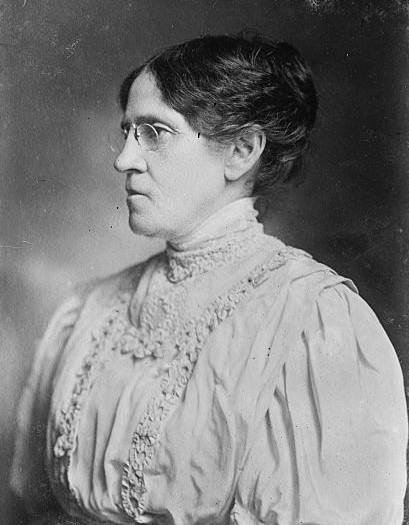
Lillian M. N. Stevens (1908)

When Lillian M. N. Stevens died of kidney failure on April 6, 1914, Gov. William Thomas Haines of Maine promptly reflected the public's response. "I have ordered the flag at half staff in recognition of the respect in which I know this great woman was held by all the people of Maine." It is believed this was the first time the flag was so lowered for any woman in Maine.

Gov. Haines summarized her significance. "Mrs. Stevens has rendered a greater service to mankind than any woman who ever lived in Maine, with possibly one exception, Harriet Beecher Stowe. And I think the greatest service of any woman of this day and generation. She was a wonder of intellect, moral and physical strength."

She was buried at Stroudwater Burying Ground in Portland, Maine.

In 1917, "The Little Water Girl" temperance fountain was donated to the City of Portland by the W.C.T.U. Designed by British sculptor George Wade for the Columbia Exposition at Chicago, this bronze copy was given to honor Lillian M. N. Stevens, 55-year-long resident of the city, and president of the Maine W.C.T.U., the National W.C.T.U., and benefactor of Portland. Originally installed at Congress Square, since 1979 it has been located in the Portland Public Library.
