= Woman's Temperance Publishing Association =

- Industry: Temperance publication
- Founded: Indianapolis, Indiana (1879)
- Founder: Matilda Carse
- Headquarters: Illinois, USA
- Area served: North America

The Woman's Temperance Publishing Association (WTPA) was a non-commercial publisher of temperance literature. Established in 1879 in Indianapolis, Indiana during the national convention of the Woman's Christian Temperance Union (WCTU), it was a concept of Matilda Carse, an Irish-born American businesswoman, social reformer and leader of the temperance movement.

The WTPA was designed as a joint-stock company and operated in Illinois. No man could own its stock, as it could only be sold to WCTU women. It began with US$5,000 of capital stock, which increased to US$125,000. The Board of Directors consisted of seven women, including Carse. The WTPA was dissolved in 1903.

== Newspaper ==
At the first convention of the WCTU, the need of an official organ was recognized, and Abby Fisher Leavitt, of Cincinnati, moved the appointment of a committee "to consider the question of publishing a paper". The following June, the first number of the paper, called the Woman's Temperance Union, was issued, its first editor being Jennie Fowler Willing, of Illinois, and its publisher Mary Coffin Johnson, of New York. At an executive meeting held at the close of the Newark Convention in 1876, a publishing committee was appointed: Mary Towne Burt, New York; Jane M. Geddes, Michigan; Frances E. Willard, Illinois; Esther Pugh, Ohio; Harriet Maria Haven, Vermont; Zerelda G. Wallace, Indiana, and Caroline Brown Buell, Connecticut. Burt, Willard and Buell were made a quorum for the transaction of business. The quorum at once changed the name to Our Union, made Burt publisher, and Margaret Elizabeth Winslow, of Brooklyn, editor. In 1882, at the Louisville Convention, the paper was combined with the Illinois Signal under the name, Our Union Signal, and became the property of the Woman's Temperance Publication Association, which, although separately incorporated, was the publishing house of the National WECTU.

The weekly newspaper was named The Signal and its first issue, 16 pages in size, appeared January 4, 1880. The first editor was Mary Willard, mother of Frances Willard, the second president of the WCTU. At the end of the first year, there were 3,200 subscriptions. Eventually, readership reached over 90,000 subscribers. and 135 people were employed. "Thou hast given a banner to them that fear thee, that it may be displayed because of the truth" was the newspaper's motto. In 1882, The Signal merged with Our Union of New York to become The Union Signal.

== Other publications ==
In addition to the newspaper, the WTPA published article reprints called "Timely Talks". After consolidating its "Illinois Workers' Leaflets", "National Leaflets" covered instruction in departmental work. The Oak and Ivy Leaf was written for young women, The Young Crusader was for children, and there were also several books, including Childhood: Its Care and Culture. The Band of Hope Lesson Manual was published as a quarterly.

== Notable people ==
- Caroline Brown Buell
- Mary Towne Burt
- Matilda Carse
- Jane M. Geddes
- Ruby I. Gilbert (1851–1945), bookkeeper, WTPA
- Harriet Maria Haven
- Mary Coffin Johnson
- Esther Pugh
- Katharine Lente Stevenson (1853–1919), temperance reformer, missionary, editor
- Margaret Ashmore Sudduth (1859–1957), American educator, editor, temperance advocate
- Zerelda G. Wallace
- Frances E. Willard
- Mary Willard
- Jennie Fowler Willing
- Margaret Elizabeth Winslow
