= Caroline M. Clark Woodward =

American temperance worker (1840–1924)

- Born: Caroline Mary Clark; November 17, 1840; Mequon, Wisconsin, U.S.
- Died: November 20, 1924 (aged 84); Lincoln, Nebraska, U.S.
- Occupations: activist; newspaper writer; politician
- Organization: Woman's Christian Temperance Union
- Political party: Prohibition Party
- Movement: temperance
- Board member of: Woman's Temperance Temple
- Spouse: William Wallace Woodward (m. 1861; died 1915)

Caroline M. Clark Woodward (November 17, 1840 – November 20, 1924) was an American temperance activist, who entered the field in 1882 as a temperance writer. She was affiliated with the Woman's Christian Temperance Union (W.C.T.U.) in Nebraska and served as a trustee of the Woman's Temperance Temple in Chicago. Woodward received Prohibition Party nominations for Regent of the Nebraska University and for member of Congress. A forcible speaker, she conducted schools of "Methods" at Chautauqua Assemblies.

== Early life and education ==
Caroline Mary Clark was born in Mequon, near Milwaukee, Wisconsin, November 17, 1840. (Note: According to Woodward's obituary in The Banner Press (1924), Caroline Mary Clark was born November 7, 1836.) Her father, Jonathan M. Clark, was a Vermonter of English descent, who, born in 1812, of Revolutionary parentage, inherited an intense American patriotism. Her mother, Mary Turch Clark, of German and French ancestry, was born and bred on the banks of the Hudson River. Both were persons of more than ordinary education and, though burdened with the cares of a family of one son and seven daughters, were life-long students. Caroline was the oldest daughter.

She attended the district school in a log house till seventeen years of age. To that was added one year of study in German in a private school. At the age of eight years, she was considered quite a prodigy in her studies.

== Career ==
At the age of seventeen she began to teach. After two years of study in the Milwaukee high school under John G. McKidley, a teacher and organizer of educational work, she taught in the public schools of that city.

In Mequon, May 15, 1861, she married William Wallace Woodward (1828–1915). For eighteen years, they made their home on a farm near Milwaukee, a favorite visiting place for a large number of cultivated friends and acquaintances. Since 1875, she was engaged in public affairs, serving as secretary of the Woman's Foreign Missionary Society and as president of the Milwaukee district association.

In 1879, they removed to Seward, Nebraska. She was identified with the same work in Nebraska as she was in Milwaukee. In 1882, she entered the field of temperance as a newspaper writer, and she demonstrated herself to be a consistent and useful worker in that cause and in all the other reformations of the times. In 1884, she was elected treasurer of the Nebraska W.C.T.U., and in 1887, vice-president-at-large of the State. In 1887, she was appointed organizer for the National W.C.T.U. and was twice reappointed. In the Atlanta convention, she was elected associate superintendent of the department of work among railroad employees. She was a member of each national convention of the W.C.T.U. since and including the memorable St. Louis convention of 1884. She was a friend of Frances Willard and a member of the Board of Trustees of the Woman's Temperance Temple in Chicago.

She was a delegate to the National Prohibition Party Convention of 1888, held in Indianapolis. She was nominated by that party for regent of the State University in 1891 and led the State ticket by a large vote.

Woodward studied "Methods" under Mary Allen West at Lake Bluff, Illinois and Chicago schools and thereafter conducted schools of Methods at various Chautauqua Assemblies. She was an articulate speaker and an experienced parliamentarian.

== Personal life ==
Have no children of her own, Woodward took into her home and reared four foster children.

In religion, she was Methodist.

Caroline Mary Clark Woodward died at Lincoln, Nebraska, November 20, 1924. Woodward's death resulted from infirmities due to her advanced age. She had been in poor health for some time, her last illness being of four weeks duration. Burial was in David City, Nebraska.
