= Temperance Temple =

Temperance Temple may refer to:

- Temperance Temple (Baltimore), built by the Sons of Temperance in Baltimore, Maryland, US; see History of slavery in Maryland
- Temperance Temple (Chicago), a demolished Woman's Christian Temperance Union building in Chicago, Illinois, US
- Temperance Temple (Los Angeles), a demolished Woman's Christian Temperance Union building in Los Angeles, California, US; see Victorian Downtown Los Angeles § Temperance Temple
