= Caroline Brown Buell =

American activist (1843-1927)

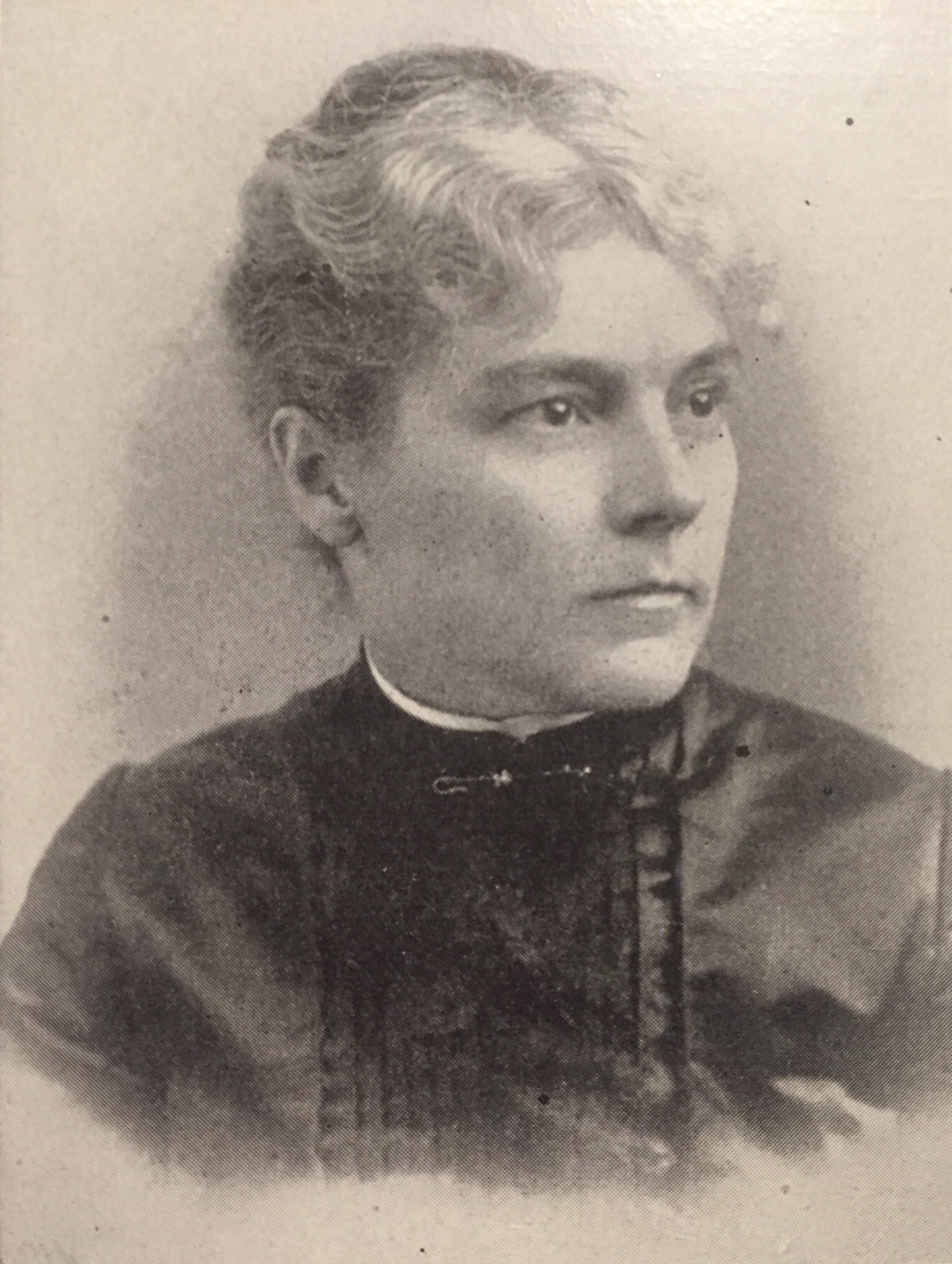
- "A woman of the century"
- Born: Caroline Brown; October 24, 1843; Marlborough, Massachusetts, U.S.
- Died: 1927 (aged 83–84)
- Resting place: Lakeview Cemetery, East Hampton, Connecticut, U.S.
- Occupation: activist
- Spouse: Frederick W. H. Buell (m. 1862; died 1865)
- Children: 1
- Writing career
- Language: English
- Genre: non-fiction
- Movements: temperance, suffrage

Caroline Brown Buell (October 24, 1843 - 1927) was an American activist who lectured and wrote on behalf of temperance and suffrage. She served as the assistant recording secretary (1878–80), corresponding secretary (1880–93), and a member of the Our Union publication committee (1876–83) of the National Woman's Christian Temperance Union (WCTU); as well as the president (1904) and corresponding secretary (1875–86) of the Connecticut WCTU. She also originated the plan of the Loyal Temperance Legion, the children's society of the WCTU. Buell wrote extensively for temperance publications, and other papers and magazines. She lived in East Hampton, Connecticut.

== Early life and education ==
Caroline Brown was born in Marlborough, Massachusetts, October 24, 1843. (Note: Willard & Livermore (1893) record Buell's year of birth as 1842.) Her ancestry was New England and Puritan. She was the daughter of Rev. Thomas Gibson Brown (died in 1885), of the New England Conference of the Methodist Episcopal Church, and Caroline M. Daniels (1808-1892).

The paternal side of her family had emigrated from England to New England, to New Hampshire. Caroline's grandfather vigorously supported the fight for American independence, taking up arms and participating in the Battle of Bunker's Hill, and helped to "fire the shot heard round the world." His wife, too, was of vigorous stock, a hearty Yankee woman, who nurtured her little family of fifteen boys and girls. She was able to hold her own in an argument, and even when vanquished she could argue still. Both she and her husband lived to old age, as did their fathers and mothers before them, and they died near a hundred years old. Her maternal ancestors settled in New England in the earliest period of its history, in the Mayflower, and colonized finally in Connecticut.

Caroline was the only daughter of an itinerant Methodist minister. Wanting a wider intellectual culture, she read widely, both inside and outside the regular school curriculum. In this way she developed the traits which made her a counselor and adviser. She was educated in public and private schools.

== Career ==
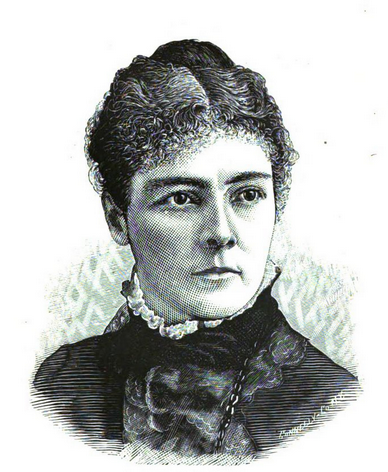
Caroline Brown Buell

On August 25, 1862, in East Hampton, Connecticut, the day before he left to join the Union Army in the Civil War, she married Lt. Frederick W. H. Buell, of the 18th Connecticut Infantry Regiment. He died during the war in 1865. During the war her father, husband and three brothers also served the Union, three in the army and two brothers in the navy. Her father was the chaplain of her husband's regiment, and in war, he earned the name of "The Fighting Chaplain." In the last year of the conflict, her husband died, leaving her alone with her only son. The war record of her family made her a favorite with the veterans of the war.

In ensuing years, after the death of her eldest brother's wife, Buell took care of his motherless children. Here, she spent more than three years of her life. It was here she was found when, in 1876, she was chosen to be the Corresponding Secretary of the WCTU of Connecticut, which had been organized in some measure the preceding year. She entered at once into the work devolved upon her, and gave to the organization the benefit of her executive ability, so that speedily the WCTU in Connecticut was put into orderly and effective shape. Her sound judgment, her powers of discrimination, her energy, her acquaintance with facts and persons, and her facile pen made her at once a power in the association. She came into office when much was new and experimental, and she gave positive direction to the work and originated many plans of procedure. It was in her first year as Corresponding Secretary of the Connecticut Union that she devised the plan of quarterly returns, that went on to be adopted all over the country by the various State Unions. Annually, since that period, Buell was honored by re-election to the Corresponding Secretary's position.

At an executive meeting held at the close of the WCTU's Newark Convention in 1876, a publishing committee was appointed, which included Buell, representing Connecticut, as well as Mary Towne Burt, New York; Jane M. Geddes, Michigan; Frances E. Willard, Illinois; Esther Pugh, Ohio, Harriet Maria Haven, Vermont and Zerelda G. Wallace, Indiana. Buell, Burt, and Willard were made a quorum for the transaction of business. The quorum at once renamed the WCTU organ to Our Union, made Burt publisher, and Margaret Elizabeth Winslow, of Brooklyn, editor. According to Gifford (1995), Buell, Pugh, and Frances H. Rastall went on to use The Union Signal to promote their private businesses.

In 1880, in the Boston convention, Buell was chosen corresponding secretary of the National WCTU, and in that position she was. noted for her effective work with her writing and lecturing for the association. She was re-elected to that office for twelve years straight. Upon the platform, as a speaker before an audience, she was described as self-poised, self-unconscious, earnest, and impressive. In the 1893 book, A Woman of the Century, suffragettes Frances Elizabeth Willard and Mary Ashton Rice Livermore described her as a dignified presiding officer and an accomplished parliamentarian, and in State conventions she had often filled the chair in emergencies.

Buell was a member of the National American Woman Suffrage Association (NAWSA), the National Purity Association, Sorosis, and the Century Study Clubs. She died in 1927 and is buried at Lakeview Cemetery, East Hampton, Connecticut.
