= Temperance Temple (Chicago) =

Office building in Chicago, Illinois

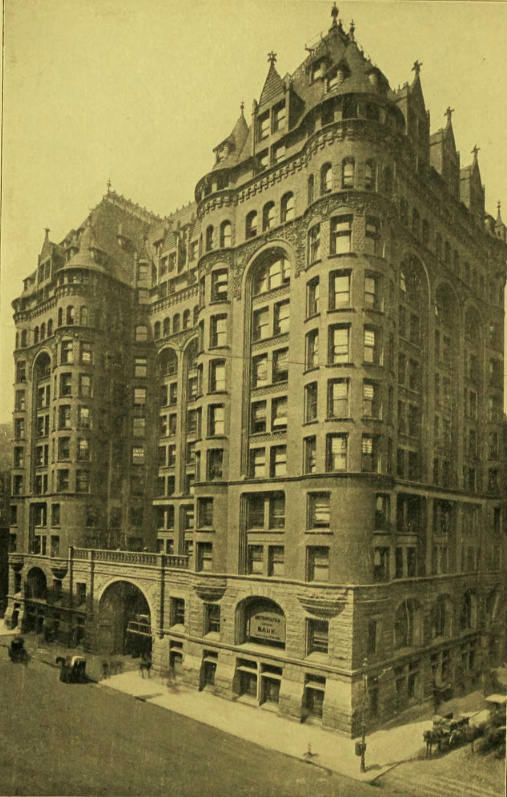
- Alternative names: Woman's Temple; Women's Temple

General information
- Status: demolished
- Type: commercial
- Architectural style: combination of Gothic and French architecture
- Location: southwest corner of LaSalle Street and Monroe Street, Chicago, Illinois, U.S.
- Coordinates: 41.8803°N 87.6328°W
- Groundbreaking: 1890
- Opened: May 1892
- Demolished: 1926
- Cost: US$1,200,000
- Owner: Temple Building Association of Chicago
- Affiliation: Woman's Christian Temperance Union

Technical details
- Material: brick; granite; marble; terra cotta
- Floor count: 13
- Lifts/elevators: 8
- Grounds: 166 by 100 feet (51 m × 30 m)

Design and construction
- Architect: John Wellborn Root

Temperance Temple (also known as Women's Temple or Woman's Temple) served as the headquarters of the National Woman's Christian Temperance Union (WCTU). It was located in Chicago, Illinois at the southwest corner of LaSalle Street and Monroe Street, in the center of city's financial district. Work was begun in July 1890, and the building was ready for occupancy in May 1892. The lot was valued at US$1,000,000; the rentals from the building were expected to bring in an annual income of over US$200,000. The capital stock was US$600,000, one-half of which was owned by the Temple Building Association of Chicago (TBAC), and it was expected all would be secured to that association. The TBAC, a stock company with Marshall Field president of the board of trustees, owned The Temple, the third of the affiliated interests of the National WCTU. The office building was erected at a cost of US$1,200,000 on ground leased to the TBAC by Field. Temperance Temple was demolished in 1926.

== History ==
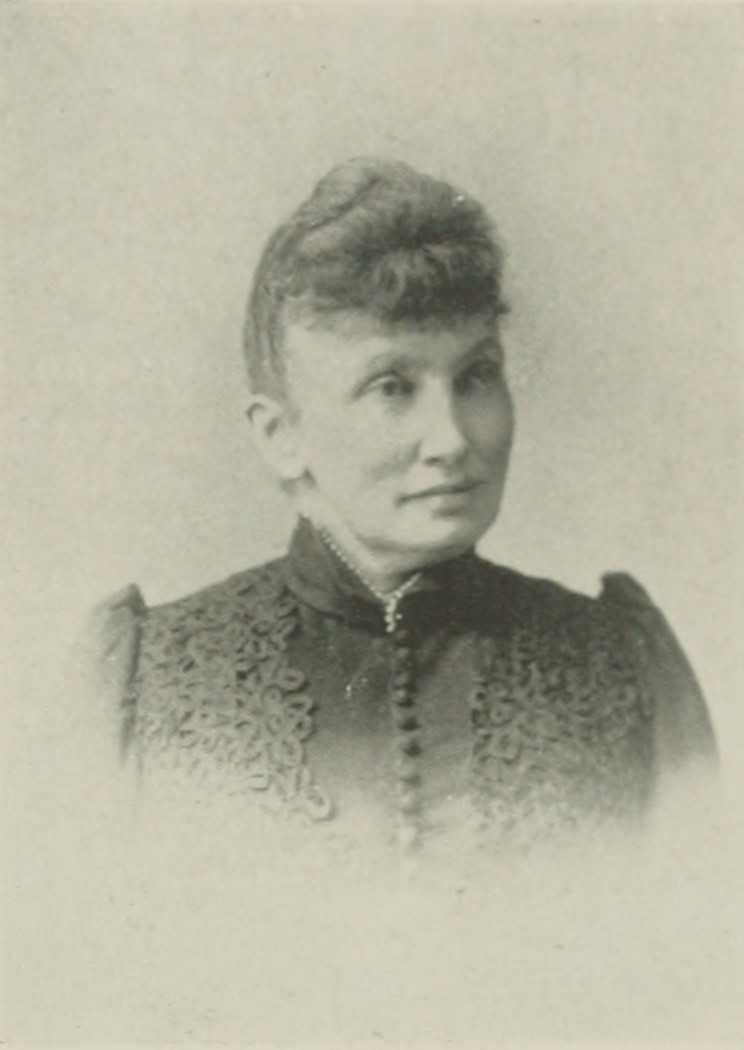
Matilda Carse

Fourteen years after women inaugurated the temperance crusade and organized the Woman's Christian Temperance Union, the organization had no less than 43 separate and distinct lines of work. It needed a national headquarters for its constituency, which numbered 200,000 women, in addition to another 200,000 boys and girls in the Loyal Temperance Legions. Around 1883, the need for a national building and large income impressed itself upon Matilda Carse. With the cooperation of Frances Willard, Carse began planning for the erection of a building in Chicago to be known as the Temperance Temple. In pursuance of this long-contemplated plan, on July 13, 1887, the TBAC was incorporated. Its purpose was to erect in Chicago a building as headquarters for the National WCTU, with a capital stock of US$500,000; shares, US$100 each. When the stock was all sold US$300,000 worth of bonds, bearing 5 percent interest, would be issued.

The local societies of the WCTU were asked to give US$500,000 towards this enterprise. There were 10,000 local unions in the U.S. at the time. If but one-half of these gave US$100 each, the Association would reach the desired half-million, which is the amount of the capital stock. In order, however, to give the unions sufficient time to raise this sum, the stock was to be sold to capitalists who were friendly to the cause, with the privilege of buying it back again within five years, with the understanding, also, that the dividends were not to exceed 5 percent annually. It was hoped that at the end of five years, the desired US$500,000 would be raised by the unions, with which the corporation would buy up the entire capital stock for the National Society.

This building was projected to bring in a rental income amounting, at the lowest calculation, to US$181,500 a year. With this money, the Association proposed to pay off the US$300,000 bonded debt. When the building was clear of debt, the National WCTU, having free headquarters, would also receive half the income from the rentals. The other half would go to the States. The States would receive a pro rata of this dividend in proportion to the amount they had given toward the building fund. Construction costs were estimated to be US$800,000.

The Board of Temple Trustees was secured in January 1892. On the board were four men, some of them being among the largest capitalists of Chicago. The board also included: Frances Willard, Helen Louise Hood, Lady Henry Somerset, as well as Mesdames Marion Howard Dunham, Mary Torrans Lathrap, Helen Morton Barker, Clara Cleghorn Hoffman, Susan Fessenden, W. H. Munnell, Lillian M. N. Stevens, Ellen Louise Demorest, Harriet B. Kells, and Caroline M. Clark Woodward.

Esther Pugh, National WCTU treasurer, was the recipient of a steady stream of donations from all the States and Territories of the U.S., and from Europe, Japan, and India.

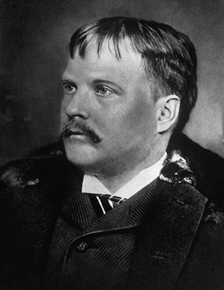
John Wellborn Root

The building was designed by John Wellborn Root. Its cornerstone was laid with impressive ceremonies on November 1, 1890. Root died in 1891, and the building was ready for occupancy in May 1892. The Woman's Temperance Publishing Association house was headquartered in the building, as well as the Central Chicago WCTU. Most of the building, however, was rented and the initial income from this source was US$25,000 a year.

The yearly ground rental —US$40,000— was each year the first financial obligation to be met from Temple rental receipts. Carse, a member of the board of trustees and president of the Central WCTU of Chicago, was the chief promoter of plans for its ownership by the WCTU. The National WCTU worked towards such ownership over a period of eleven years. Willard Hall was the soul of the Temple Building. The strength of its appeal to Frances Willard and the active workers of that decade cannot be overestimated. Daily, it was the scene of a noontide gospel temperance meeting, which perpetuated the old Farwell Hall daily prayer service of the early years of the Chicago WCTU.

Following Willard's death in February, 1898, her successor to the presidency of the National WCTU, Lillian M. N. Stevens, with her co-officers and members of the Official Board made every possible effort to carry to successful completion certain plans adopted at the Buffalo, New York, convention in 1897. This program featured an endeavor to raise US$300,000 to pay off the purchasers of Temple Trust Bonds, issued by Carse "as an individual for and on behalf of the National WCTU."

It became necessary to call a meeting of the National Executive Committee to discuss the Temple situation. This meeting was held in Chicago, July 15, 1898. After two days of discussion, a resolution to be recommended to the national convention was adopted, providing that all effort on the part of the National WCTU to own the Temple Building should be discontinued. "While not legally bound," the resolution stated, "we regard it as a sacred trust to purchase before the next convention the US$300,000 worth of Temple Trust Bonds issued by the promoters of The Temple enterprise." At the National WCTU convention in Saint Paul, Minnesota, a few months later, after prolonged and dispassionate discussion, these recommendations were adopted and The Temple as an affiliated interest was discontinued. Many of the Temple Trust Bonds held by needy individuals were retired, but, much to the regret of the committee in charge, it proved impossible to raise the entire amount of US$300,000.

The building was demolished in 1926.

== Location ==
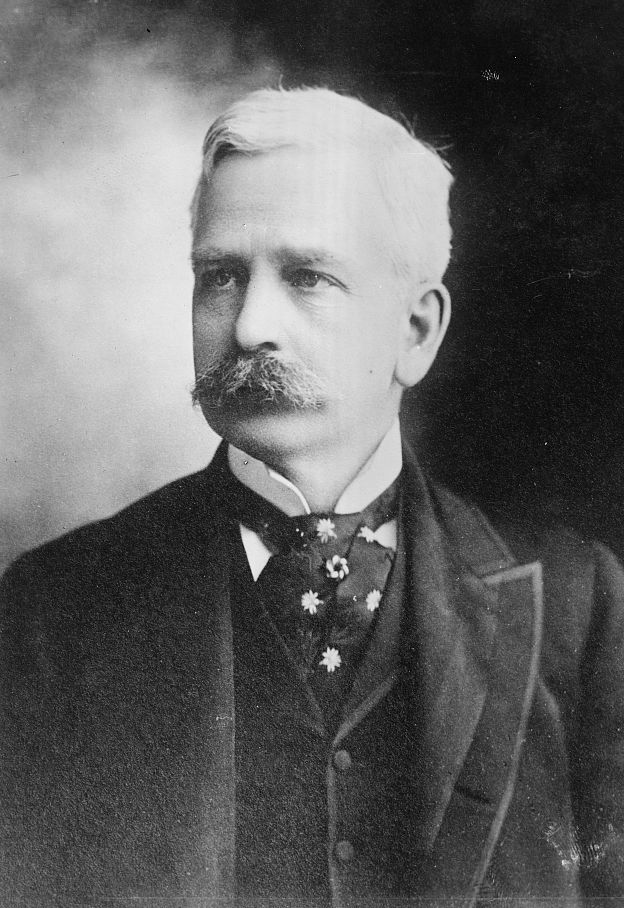
Marshall Field

A valuable lot with a frontage on three streets was located at the southwest corner of LaSalle and Monroe streets, in the business portion of Chicago. A legal dispute arose between Marshall Field and his business partner, Levi Leiter, who owned property adjoining, and the work planned by Field was abandoned, the lot fenced in for three or four years. The Woman's Temperance Building Association secured a 99 year lease of the property from Field.

The lot measured 166 feet (51 m) long by 100 feet (30 m) deep. The only way it could be secured was by a lease-hold title. The lease, however, was perpetual, and the charge for ground rent, US$35,000 a year, could never be increased.

== Architecture and fittings ==
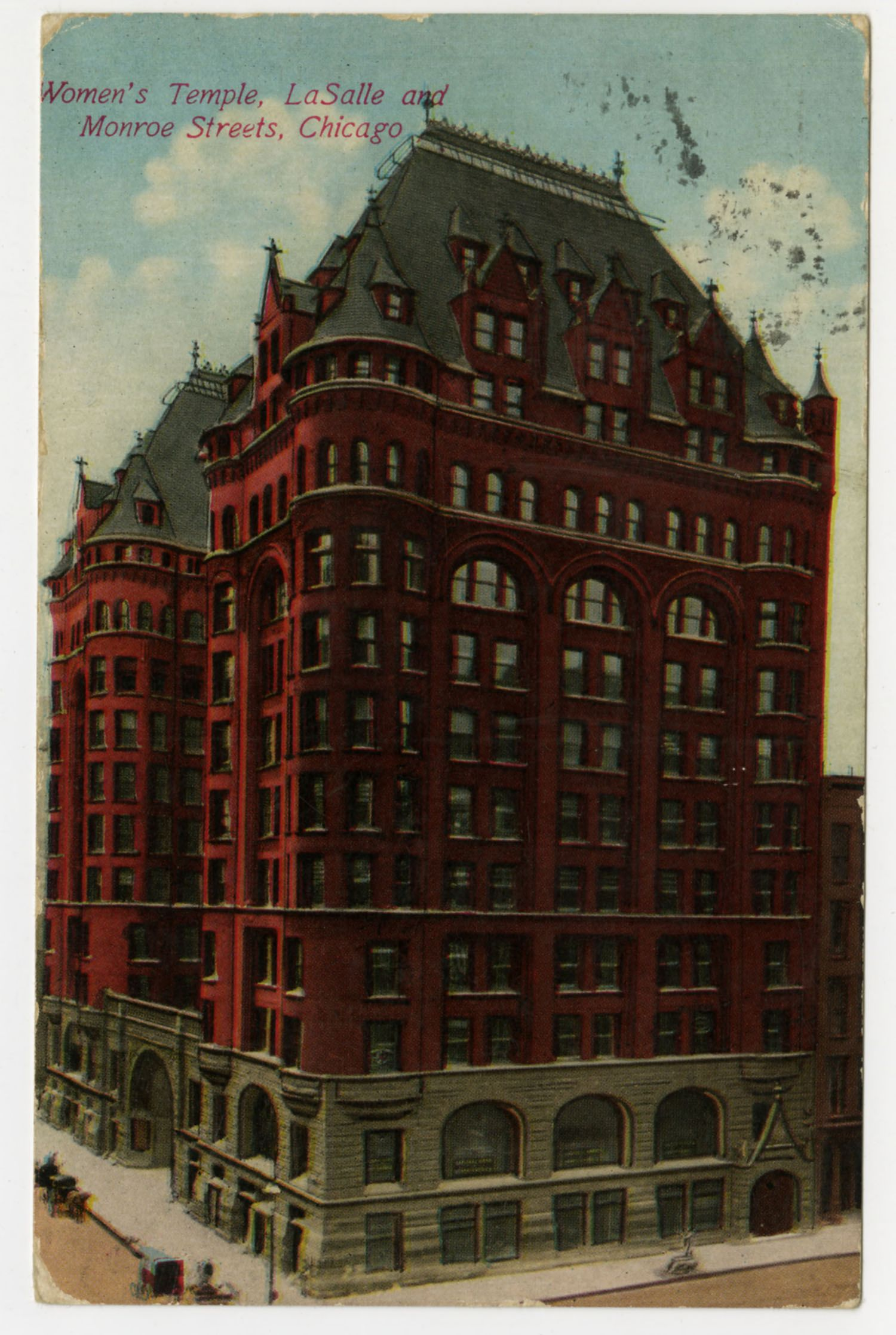
Women's Temple

The building was a combination of the old Gothic and the more modern French architecture styles. Little wood was used in the construction and the building was fireproof.

For the first two stories, the material used was gray granite with a dash of pink running through it. Above that was used pressed brick and terra cotta. This harmonized nicely with the granite, taking on a tone and color the same, with the exception that it is a darker pink. The frontage on La Salle Street was 190 feet (58 m), while on Monroe Street, it was 90 feet (27 m). In shape, the building was somewhat novel for its day, likened to the letter "H". It consisted of two immense wings united by a middle portion, or viaculum. On LaSalle Street was a court 70 feet (21 m) long and 30 feet (9.1 m) wide, and on Monroe Street, a similar one of the same length and 18 feet (5.5 m) deep.

Facing the "grand entrance" and arranged in a semi-circle were eight elevators, and from the front court rose two grand stairways leading clear to the top of the building. A central hall extended north and south on each floor and a transverse one also extended into the wings. The lower courts and halls were resplendent with marble mosaic paving, while plain marble was used in the upper halls.

In height, the temple was a skyscraper, extending thirteen stories. A pleasing effect was gained by causing the building line to retreat at the tenth story where the immense roof, containing three stories, commenced, breaking as it ascended, into gothic turrets. On the granite around the entrance were carved the coats of arms of the various States of the Union. Upon the corner stone was engraved the national legend of the WCTU, "For God, for Home and Native Land, 1890." On the reverse was the WCTU monogram and beneath, "organized 1874".

On the lower floor were located three banks and a memorial hall, known as Willard Hall, named in honor of Frances Willard. The audience room could seat 800 people without the galleries and was entirely shut off from the rest of the building as though it were not in it. The entrance was through a wide hall opening off Monroe Street. It was an amphitheatre in shape and in the center was a fountain. Nearly every window in it was a memorial one, and from numerous pedestals rose the busts of persons who had been involved in the cause of temperance.

The hall and the entrance leading to it were used as tablets on which to inscribe the names of those who subscribed the sum of US$100 or more to the building fund. A record of the work done in each State in the Union was kept in a large vault opening off the hall.

== Notable people ==
- Helen Morton Barker
- Matilda Carse
- Ellen Louise Demorest
- Marion Howard Dunham
- Susan Fessenden
- Marshall Field
- Clara Cleghorn Hoffman
- Helen Louise Hood
- Harriet B. Kells
- Mary Torrans Lathrap
- Mrs. W. H. Munnell
- Esther Pugh
- John Wellborn Root
- Lady Henry Somerset
- Lillian M. N. Stevens
- Frances Willard
- Caroline M. Clark Woodward
