= Childhood: Its Care and Culture =

1887 book by Mary Allen West

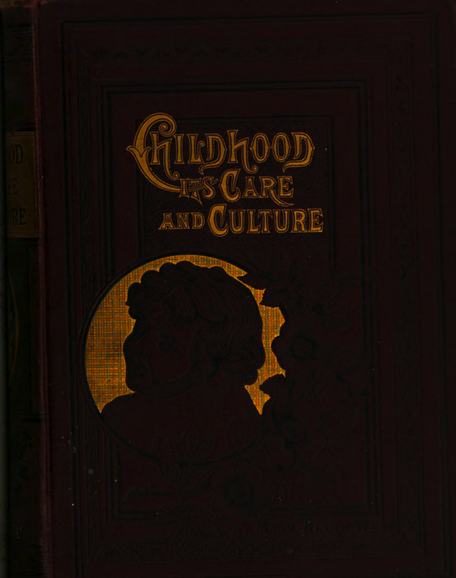
- First edition cover
- Author: Mary Allen West
- Illustrator: Gabriel Marx
- Language: English
- Subject: parenting advice
- Genre: non-fiction
- Publisher: Woman's Temperance Publishing Association
- Publication date: 1887
- Publication place: U.S.
- Pages: 772
- Website: https://books.google.com/books?id=ZZE-AQAAMAAJ

Childhood: Its Care and Culture was a parenting advice book by Mary Allen West, editor of the Union Signal. The book was published in 1887, in Chicago, Illinois, by the Woman's Temperance Publishing Association.

The author claimed that the book had grown "naturally out of the rich soil of a thousand homes", which was interpreted to mean that the author wrote from experience and observation and not from mere theory. The contents are varied, including chapters on the child's body, babyhood, childhood, boyhood and girlhood, children's rights, work and play, amusements, behavior, domestic economy, family government, practical health hints, and other topics. There are also a number of illustrations, and, interspersed among the reading matter, are songs set to music, suitable for the nursery and the home. It is pervaded by strong Christian and temperance sentiment, the author holding that the growth in a child of a true and healthy religious and physical life is greatly to be desired and sought after, not only for its own sake, but for the general well-being of society.

== Background ==
While serving as Illinois state president of the Woman's Christian Temperance Union (W.C.T.U.), and traveling throughout the state, the knowledge West gained of the inner life of thousands of homes, together with her intimate studies of children in the schoolroom, efficiently supplemented her natural bias for the task of writing her book for mothers, Childhood, its Care and Culture. In it, the author claimed that the book "has grown naturally out of the rich soil of a thousand homes," which was interpreted to mean that the author wrote from experience and observation and not from mere theory.

== Content ==
The contents were varied, including chapters on the child's body, babyhood, childhood, boyhood and girlhood, children's rights, work and play, amusements, behavior, domestic economy, family government, practical health hints, and other topics. There were also a number of illustrations, and, interspersed among the reading matter, were songs set to music, suitable for the nursery and the home. The book was an octavo of 722 pages, including a copious index. It was pervaded by strong Christian and temperance sentiment, the author holding that the growth in a child of a true and healthy religious and physical life was greatly to be desired and sought after, not only for its own sake, but for the general well-being of society. On the various practical questions coming under treatment, the views set forth were characterized as sound and sensible.

The variety and range of topics almost invited the remark that some at least must suffer from superficial or hackneyed treatment, but the author appeared to have labored over each section, and to have brought together many thoughts and counsels for the benefit of those who really desire guidance and help in the care and nurture of children.

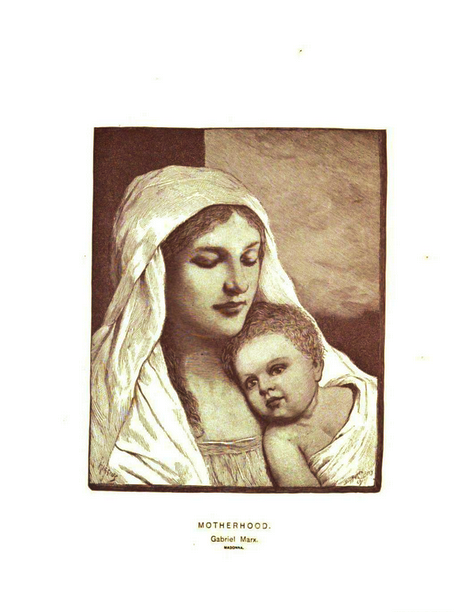
Madonna, by Gabriel Marx

The Madonna painting by Gabriel Marx depicted on the cover of the May 1888 Kindergarten-primary Magazine was copied from Childhood: Its Care and Culture.

It was characterized as popular in style but scholarly in spirit; conservative and progressive; cautious and bold; motherly and fatherly; scientific and Christian. It discussed a wide range of topics germane to the subject of childhood. It was not a book of sermons or didactic teaching.

== Style ==
Practical hints were scattered freely through the book, though for the most part the pages were taken up with profuse talk. Her principles and instructions were illustrated by experience, anecdote and poetry.

In A Study of Religious Literature for the Young (1905), A. L. Baker comments on the book's "captivating list", including "Four Feet", "Wings and Fins", "Funny Folks in Fur and Feathers", "The Fairy Land of Science", and "Bible Animals."

== Publication ==
The book was published in Chicago in 1887, by the Woman's Temperance Publishing Association. It was an octavo volume of more than 750 pages, with a copious index. It was intended for parents, and having to do with the physical, moral, intellectual, social, and religious well-being of children.

== Reception ==
According to a review at The Atlantic (1888), the spirit and purpose of the book were well, but the writer allowed herself altogether too much latitude of commonplace.

In 1892, at the Thirteenth Annual State Convention of the W.C.T.U. of California, a resolution was adopted, to the effect that the executive board recommend to the State, the adoption of Childhood, its Care and Culture for use in W.C.T.U. work.
