= Matilda Carse =

Irish-born American businesswoman, social reformer, publisher

Matilda B. Carse
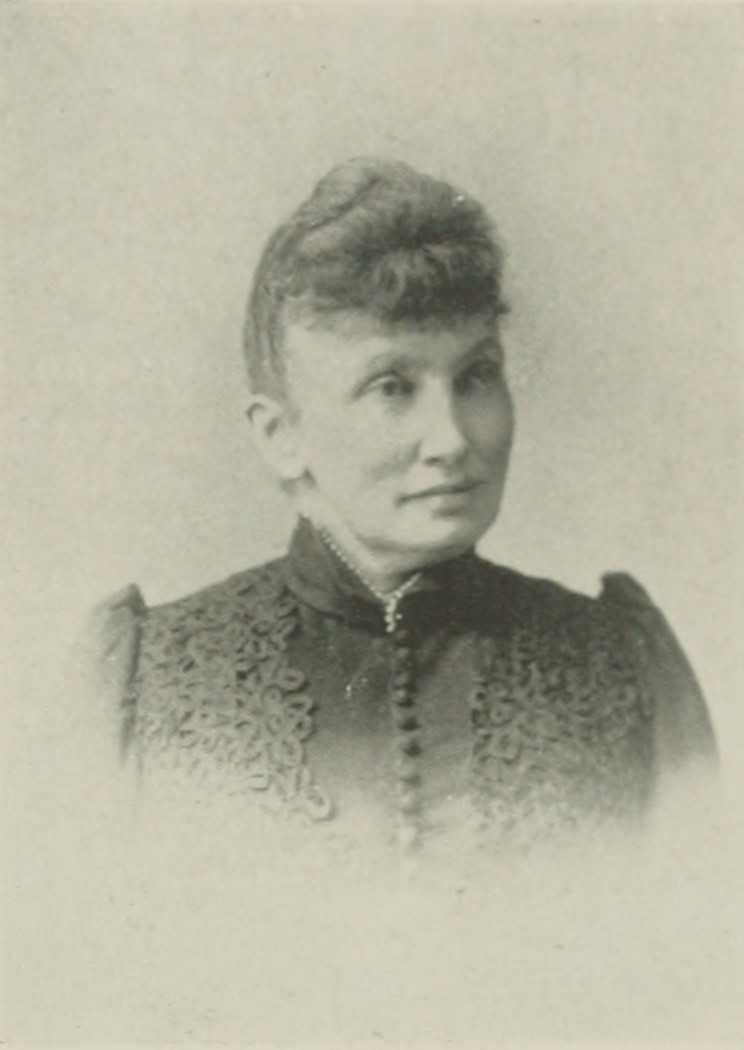
- "A Woman of the Century"
- Born: Matilda Bradley; November 19, 1835; Saintfield, Ireland
- Died: June 3, 1917 (aged 81); Park Hill, Yonkers, New York, U.S.
- Resting place: Rosehill Cemetery, Chicago, Illinois, U.S.
- Occupations: Businesswoman, social reformer, publisher, temperance movement leader
- Relatives: Thomas Carse

Matilda B. Carse (November 19, 1835 – June 3, 1917) was an Irish-born American businesswoman, social reformer, publisher, and leader of the temperance movement. With Frances E. Willard and Lady Henry Somerset, Carse helped to found the Woman's Christian Temperance Union (WCTU).

The death of Carse's youngest son caused her to devote her life to the alleviation of the poor and suffering, especially among children. She was president of the Central Chicago branch of the WCTU (CCWCTU) since 1878. She founded the Woman's Temperance Publishing Association and in January, 1880, the first number of the Signal was published. This was a large, sixteen page weekly paper and two years later, when Our Union was merged with it, it became The Union Signal, the national organ of the WCTU. In this publishing business, Carse started the first stock company composed entirely of women as no man could own stock in the Woman's Temperance Publishing Association. Carse was president and financial factor of this association from its inception. In 1885, she began planning for the Temperance Temple, National headquarters of the WCTU, which was completed in 1892 at a cost of US$1,200,000. Besides the various charities supported by the CCWCTU, Carse was actively interested in many outside philanthropies, and her name was sought by benevolent societies and charitable boards. She was long prominent in Chicago civic life and charities, and especially on behalf of women.

== Early years and education ==
Matilda Bradley was born in Saintfield, Ireland, near Belfast, November 19, 1835. Her parents, Presbyterians, were John Bradley, a linen merchant, and Catherine Cleland. They were part of a merchant family whose Scottish ancestors had left their country in the 1600s, removing to Ulster. The family was also associated with philanthropy and reform. Educated in Ireland, Carse immigrated to Chicago in 1858 with her parents after the linen trade in Ireland faced an economic decline.

== Marriage and family ==
On October 8, 1861, she married a successful railroad manager and fellow Irish immigrant, Thomas Carse. He was a railroad manager in Louisville, Kentucky, during the civil war. In 1869, they went to the French Riviera for the benefit of the husband's health. He died in Paris from tuberculosis the following year, leaving her with three boys under seven years of age: David Bradley, John Bradley, and Thomas Alexander. While in Paris, Thomas Alexander had a fall, which developed hip disease. A wealthy widow with an independent income, she used it to benefit local charities and welfare work. Her mission in life was determined soon afterward, when in Chicago, in 1874, Thomas Alexander, who had almost recovered his health, was run over by a wagon driven by a drunken German drayman and instantly killed.

== Career ==
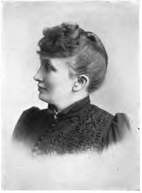
Mathilda B. Carse

=== Woman's Christian Temperance Union ===
After the death of her son, Carse became a determined and outspoken leader of the temperance movement in Chicago and nationwide in the United States. She joined the WCTU in 1874, becoming the president of the CCWCTU in 1878. The Chicago branch became one of the most successful branches of the WCTU, thanks to Carse's involvement and leadership; she was president for nearly forty years (1878–1917).

Though Carse is often remembered for her savvy as a businesswoman for the WCTU, she also sponsored various reform activities as the president of the CCWCTU. Carse's reform activities encouraged temperance but also more generally improved conditions for the working class in Chicago. She established the first nursery for children in Chicago, known as the Bethesda Day Nursery. That was followed in a year or two by the establishment, through her efforts, of a second, known as the Talcott Day Nursery. Besides this, several other nurseries, two free kindergartens, two gospel temperance unions, the Anchorage Mission, a home for runaway girls, a reading room for men, two dispensaries for the poor and two industrial schools were established through Carse's management. These charities were supported at a cost of over US$10,000. Carse personally raised almost the entire amount and never received any compensation whatever for her services to the public. The Rehobeth refuge and recovery shelter, as well as the Bethesda Mission, which was specifically aimed at teaching neighborhood women practical household skills also held temperance support meetings. Carse's social reforms positively influenced the slums of Chicago particularly by providing services and opportunities for members of the poverty-stricken working class.

=== Woman's Temperance Publishing Association ===
Matilda Carse's first major business venture was the Woman's Temperance Publishing Association (WTPA) in 1880. It was an independent stock company composed entirely of women, excepting George Hall, its original business manager—an organization that represented Carse's commitment to temperance, business and the woman's movement. The WTPA published WCTU books and pamphlets to support temperance movement reform movements. The legend goes that on November 1, 1879, at the WCTU convention in Indianapolis, Carse held a secret meeting with seven Illinois women. The subject of the conclave was the desire for a weekly newspaper to address the views, opinions, and activities of American women. That night, the women sought divine counsel, each individually imploring God for an answer. The next morning the Women's Temperance Publishing Association (WTPA) was created. Carse's business acumen made the WTPA a success, and she would serve as the head of its board of directors for the next 18 years. At its height in 1890, it employed over one hundred employees, mostly women, and published the largest women's paper in the world, the Union Signal. Carse wrote articles for the Union Signal, a WCTU weekly organ, detailing the mission and work behind her greatest project, the Temperance Temple.

Carse directly oversaw the creation and distribution of The Signal, a low-cost newspaper that featured editorials and articles focused on women and family issues of the day (McKeever, 368). She also proposed merging The Signal with Our Union, the official monthly newsletter of the WCTU. This move was initially met with much skepticism and outright negativity by the majority of WCTU members. The WCTU President, Frances Willard, however, was highly supportive of Carse's plan, and by 1882 the Union Signal, a weekly newsletter published by the WTPA, was created.

=== Temperance Temple ===
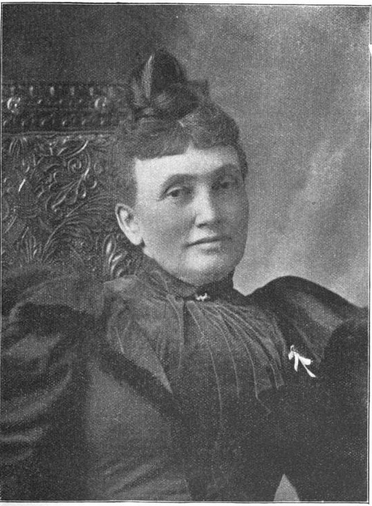
Matilda B. Carse

In 1885, she began planning for the Woman's Temperance Temple in the center of Chicago's financial district, the national headquarters of the WCTU.

Known as the Temperance Temple, it was designed as a meeting place for the CCWCTU, after their agreement with the local YMCA was cancelled. Carse's vision for the building went far beyond a union meeting-place, however: as plans developed, the Temple became a headquarters for the WCTU as well as an office building, whose rents would provide income for the WCTU's operations. In this way, the building would not only be a symbol for the temperance movement, but also a fundraiser for the WCTU that would increase its "power and autonomy". However, it was, from the onset, Carse's personal project: it was not financed or managed by the WCTU, but by Carse herself. She incorporated and acted as the (self-appointed) trustee for the Women's Temperance of Building Association (WTBA), which oversaw donations and sold stocks to finance the Temple. She sold US$600,000 in stock to Chicago businessmen and capitalists, and US$300,000 in bonds to her fellow WCTU members. Using these funds, and under the direction of Carse, the Temple was completed in 1893. it was designed by the noted architectural firm of Burnham and Root.

A large part of the controversy surrounding the Temperance Temple was created by Carse's own personality and her position as a woman in a male-dominated sphere. In order to succeed in the business world, Carse had to be outspoken, stubborn and aggressive, traits that were considered masculine and hard to reconcile with the traditional image of a Christian woman. By participating in a masculine activity like business, Carse left herself vulnerable to attack from both outside the WCTU as well as from within its ranks. Carse's insistence on bringing the WCTU into the commercial/business sphere led some in the organization to worry that worldly considerations such as money and leases were undermining their mission. Ironically, Carse's competence in securing the land and overseeing the construction of the building cast doubt on her ability to lead the project, as WCTU members increasingly viewed her activities as speculative and incompatible with a Christian women's organization. Doubts about the project and about Carse herself as the woman in charge made funding difficult, and, despite initial success, the building soon became a losing investment for the WCTU and Carse.

The troubled project came to an end largely due to an adverse business climate following the Panic of 1893. Though much of the controversy about the Temple had centered on Carse as a woman, her fate was not unique among businessmen who took on similar ventures at that particular time. The problem was not Carse's management skills; rather, it was a depression that ruined many of her lessees, and a building cycle that created a surplus of office spaces in the city. Unable to pay off the mortgage, the WTCU officially disaffiliated itself from the building, which became the property of the Field-Columbian Museum. It was finally demolished in 1926. The failed venture had put enormous strain on the WCTU, not only because of the financial loss but because of disputes over the mission of the union. Carse resigned from her presidency of the WTPA, attempting to restore unity to the WCTU through mediation and compromise.

== Later life ==
After the failure of her Temperance Temple, Carse continued to be committed to charity work. She was founder and president of the Woman's Dormitory Association of the World's Columbian Exposition. The organization gave workingwomen housing during their visit to the World's Columbian Exposition of 1893. That work was done in connection with the Board of Lady Managers of the World's Columbian Exposition, of which she was a member.

She served as president of the CCWCTU until 1913 and was the first woman on the Chicago Board of Education. Her name appeared upon several charitable boards as a director. For years, she was a member of the board of the Home for Discharged Prisoners. She was also on the free kindergarten boards, and was a member of the Woman's Club of Chicago. In all the wide range of charities to which she gave active help, the one that probably was closest to her heart, and to which she gave a stronger hand of aid than to any other, helping to raise for its buildings and maintenance tens of thousands of dollars, was the Chicago Foundling's Home, the Reverend Dr. George E. Shipman being its founder. She established its aid society, and was its president since its inception. She raised thousands of dollars for the Chicago Foundling's Home Aid Society during the time of her presidency.

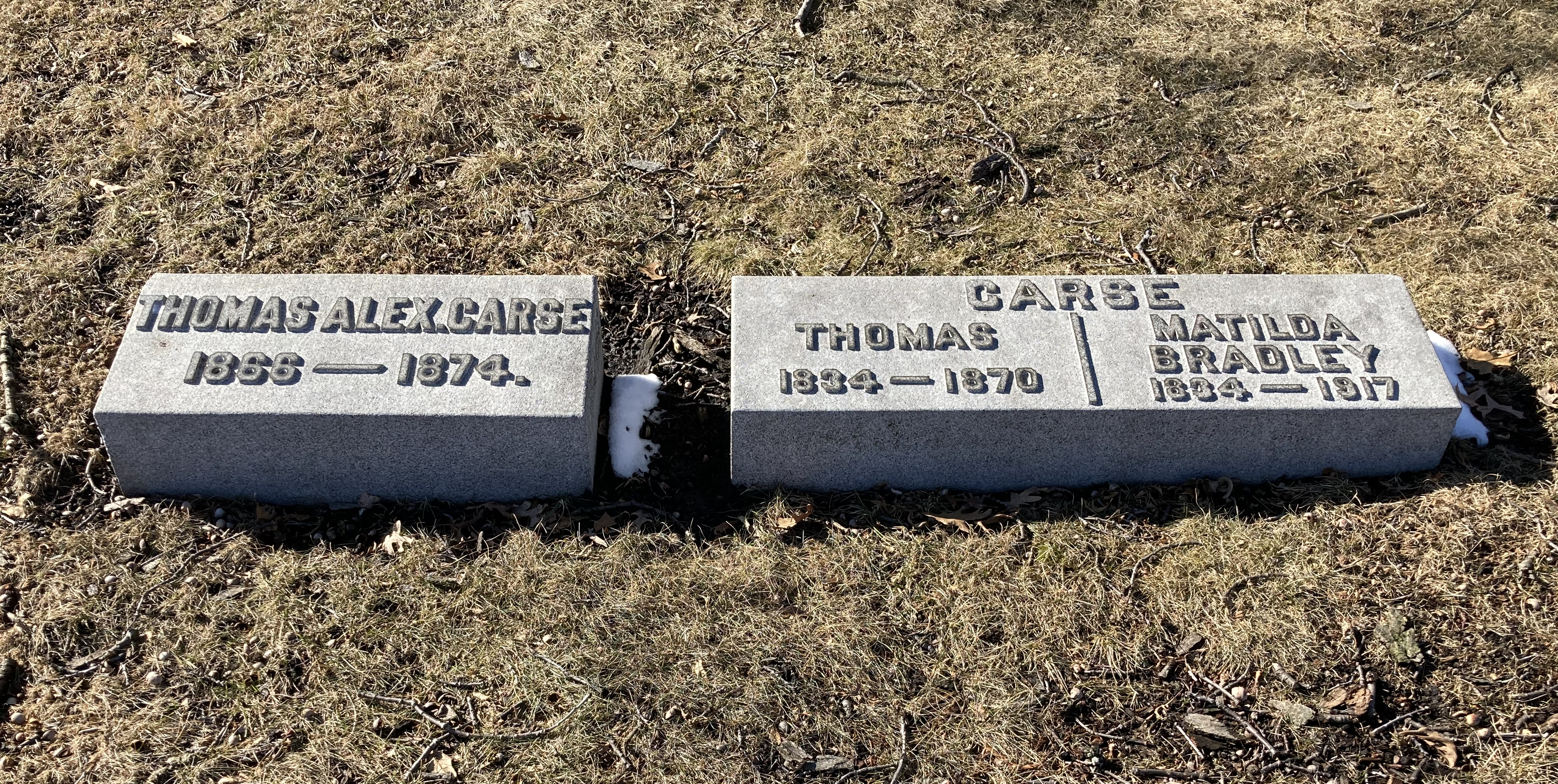
Carse's grave at Rosehill Cemetery

Her work for women is also notable. She retired to Park Hill-on-Hudson in New York City in 1913 to live with her son, David, and died there on June 3, 1917. She was buried at Rosehill Cemetery in Chicago. She is remembered as a founding member and important leader of both the temperance and women's rights movements.
