= Ruby I. Gilbert =

American businesswoman and temperance advocate (1851–1945)

Ruby Irene Gilbert
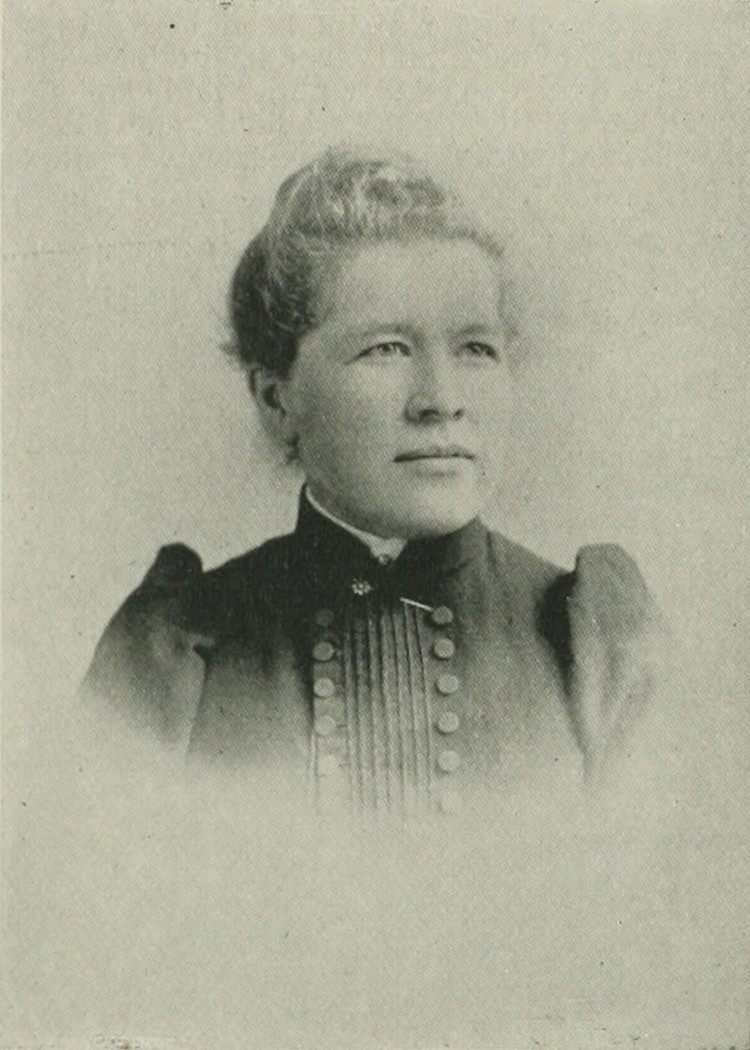
- Portrait from A Woman of the Century
- Born: December 1, 1851; Junius, New York, U.S.
- Died: August 20, 1945 (aged 93); Wilmette, Illinois, U.S.
- Occupations: Business woman; bookkeeper
- Organizations: Woman's Christian Temperance Union; Woman's Temperance Publishing Association

Ruby Irene Gilbert (December 1, 1851 – August 20, 1945) was an American business woman associated for 70 years with the white ribbon movement, particularly the Woman's Christian Temperance Union (WCTU).

== Early life and education ==
Ruby Irene Gilbert was born in Junius, New York, December 1, 1851. Her parents were of New England ancestry. Her parents were Silas B. Gilbert (1819–1894) and Julia (née, Gage) (b. 1820). Silas, like his father before him, was a Baptist minister and was educated in the public schools and academies of western New York. He did pioneer work in Illinois. Julia was a leader in religious and temperance circles. The sacrifice and devotion demanded by her parents, living the difficult life of itinerants, impressed themselves on their daughter. She went to Illinois with her parents in 1855, and was reared in the town of Mendota, Illinois. Ruby's siblings were Herbert (b. 1847), Edwin (b. 1851), Newell (b. 1854), and Nettie (b. 1859).

Her education was wholly in the public schools. In various relations that she sustained, Gilbert received diversified and thorough business training.

== Career ==
Gilbert was engaged in clerical work in Freeport, Illinois, when Frances Willard lectured there early in the Women's Crusade movement, and then first became especially interested in temperance work. For many years, Gilbert served as recording secretary of the WCTU of Illinois and bookkeeper of the Woman's Temperance Publishing Association, where she handled from US$200,000 to US$300,000 a year.

In 1882, Gilbert came into association with Mary Bannister Willard, who was at that time editor of The Union Signal. Since then, Gilbert sustained an intimate relation with Mary Willard, serving also as her legal business representative in the U.S. after the American School for Girls was established in Berlin, Germany, in 1885. Gilbert escorted parties of young ladies to Willard's school, and contributed to the success of that enterprise.

== Personal life ==
Gilbert died at a rest home in Wilmette, Illinois, August 20, 1945. Previously, she lived in Evanston, Illinois at the Monett Hotel, while still earlier, she made her home at "Rest Cottage", which was Frances Willard's home before it became W.C.T.U. National Headquarters.
