= Katharine Lent Stevenson =

American temperance reformer and editor (1853–1919)

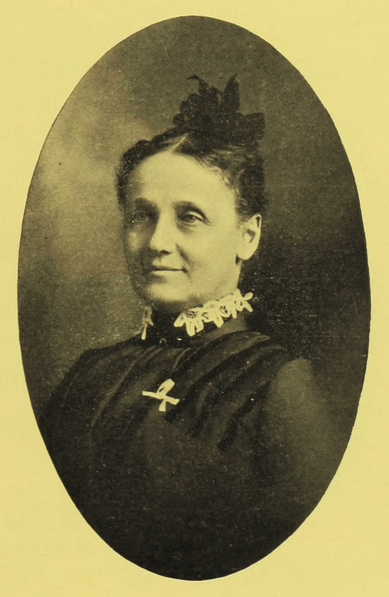
- (1904)
- Born: Katharine Lent; May 8, 1853; Copake, New York, U.S.
- Died: 1919 (aged 65–66)
- Education: Boston University School of Theology
- Occupations: reformer, missionary, editor
- Spouse: James Stevenson
- Writing career
- Language: English
- Literary movement: temperance

Katharine Lent Stevenson (née, Lent; May 8, 1853 – 1919) was an American temperance reformer, missionary, and editor. She was a successful platform speaker, writer, and officer of the World Woman's Christian Temperance Union (WWCTU) on whose behalf she also visited Japan, China, India, Australia and other countries as a missionary. She also served as president of the Massachusetts WCTU in 1898.

== Early life and education ==
Katharine (sometimes spelled "Katherine") Lent (sometimes spelled "Lente") was born in Copake, New York, May 8, 1853. Her father was Marvin R. Lente; her mother, Hannah Lonzada. On the mother's side, she was of Jewish ancestry.

In 1881, Stevenson graduated from Boston University School of Theology, the only woman in her class, and pronounced by the dean "the best balanced mind in the school."

== Career ==
The refusal of the General Conference of the Methodist Episcopal Church to recognize women as preachers terminated her ministry as associate pastor of the Methodist church in Allston, Massachusetts, but it was her dream to be in charge of a church — Methodist if it may be, Independent if it must be.

After marrying James Stevenson, a merchant of Boston, Newton, Massachusetts became her home.

=== WCTU ===
In 1893, she removed to Chicago to serve as editor of the Books and Leaflets Department for the Woman's Temperance Publishing Association, and contributing editor to the National WCTU's The Union Signal. In November, 1894, the National WCTU showed its appreciation of her two years' service, 1891–93, as Corresponding Secretary of the Massachusetts WCTU by electing her to the same office in the national organization.

In September 1909, she traveled to Christchurch, New Zealand and spoke on behalf of temperance. She then went to Tasmania for a week before going to Australia. In November, Stevenson toured Australia in the interests of temperance reform, sent by the WWCTU as a representative of the world's officers of the Union on a special mission to the educational institutions of the Far East, including India, China, Japan, and Burma. Australia was not on her program, but when she had finished in China and Japan, she resolved, on her own account, to make a tour through Australia to see it, and to help the temperance workers in the chief centers. She traveled from Bombay to Egypt, Israel, Greece and Italy before she came to London.

In June 1910, Stevenson attended the eighth Triennial convention of the WWCTU in Glasgow. She was appointed to oversee the WWCTU Missionary Fund Department.

== Personal life ==
Stevenson was also a homemaker and step-mother to three daughters. She was a member of Good Templars Commonwealth Lodge of Boston. She died in 1919.
