= Marion Howard Dunham =

American teacher, temperance activist, suffragist, socialist

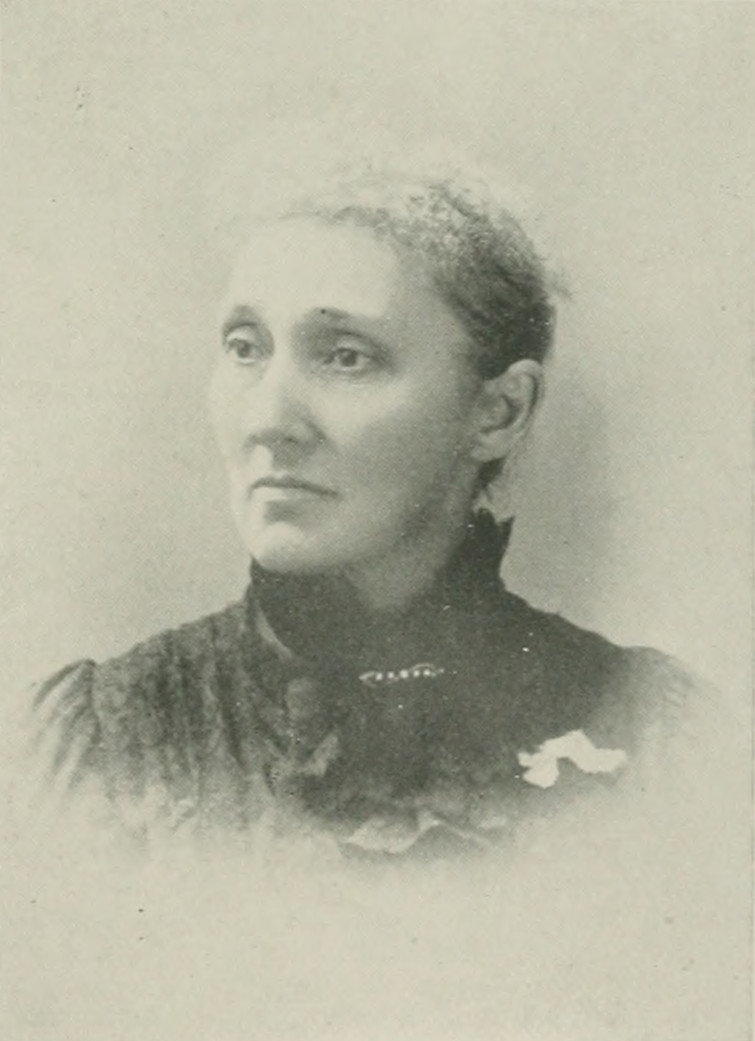
- "A Woman of the Century"
- Born: Marion H. Howard; December 6, 1842; Burton, Ohio, U.S.
- Died: December 27, 1921 (aged 79); Los Angeles, California, U.S.
- Occupations: teacher; activist; suffragist; Christian socialist
- Organization: Woman's Christian Temperance Union
- Spouse: Charles A. Dunham (m. 1873)

Marion Howard Dunham (née, Howard; December 6, 1842 – December 27, 1921) was an American teacher, temperance activist, and suffragist. She entered upon the temperance field in 1877 with the inauguration of the red ribbon movement in her state of Iowa, but believing in more permanent effort, she was the prime agitator in the organization of the local Woman's Christian Temperance Union (W.C.T.U.). In 1883, she was elected state superintendent of the Department of Scientific Temperance and held the office for four years lecturing to institutes and general audiences on that subject most of the time. She procured the "Prohibitory law of the state of Iowa", in February 1886. When the Iowa State Temperance Union began to display its opposition to the national W.C.T.U., she came to be considered a leader on the side of the minority who adhered to the national and when the majority in the state union seceded from the national union October 16, 1890, she was elected president of those remaining auxiliary to that body. She spent a large part of her time in the field lecturing on temperance.

In addition to her temperance work, she was always a radical equal suffragist, who spoke and wrote much on that subject. A Christian socialist and an outspoken militant, Dunhan was an asset to the Socialist women's movement.

== Early life and education ==
Marion H. Howard was born at Burton, Ohio, December 6, 1842. She passed the first part of her life upon a farm. Her parents were Justice Howard and Clara Taylor Howard.

She was educated in the public schools till the age of fifteen, when she became a teacher, using the money thus earned to complete her education in various Ohio institutions.

== Career ==
In 1873, she married Charles A. Dunham, an architect of Burlington, Iowa, and went with her husband to reside in that city. She took part in the Red Ribbon movement there in 1877, and was the prime facilitator in the organization of the Burlington W.C.T.U. She was elected president, and later became president of the county and district organizations. In 1883, she was elected State superintendent of the department of Scientific Temperance. She spent the next four years largely in lecturing on that subject to institutes and various other assemblies. During that period, she procured from the Legislature the Iowa law of 1886. In 1890, when the Iowa W.C.T.U. withdrew from the national organization, Dunham decided to remain with the minority, and she was elected State president of the remnant that still adhered to the National W.C.T.U. She was for a number of years almost the only W.C.T.U. speaker in Iowa representing the national body. She labored to bring about an adjustment of the differences. At length her efforts were rewarded with success in the reuniting of both branches.

She afterward moved back to Chicago, where she was elected president of the Cook County, Illinois W.C.T.U. She served for many years as a member of the Board of Trustees, and also as secretary, of the Woman’s Temple of Chicago.

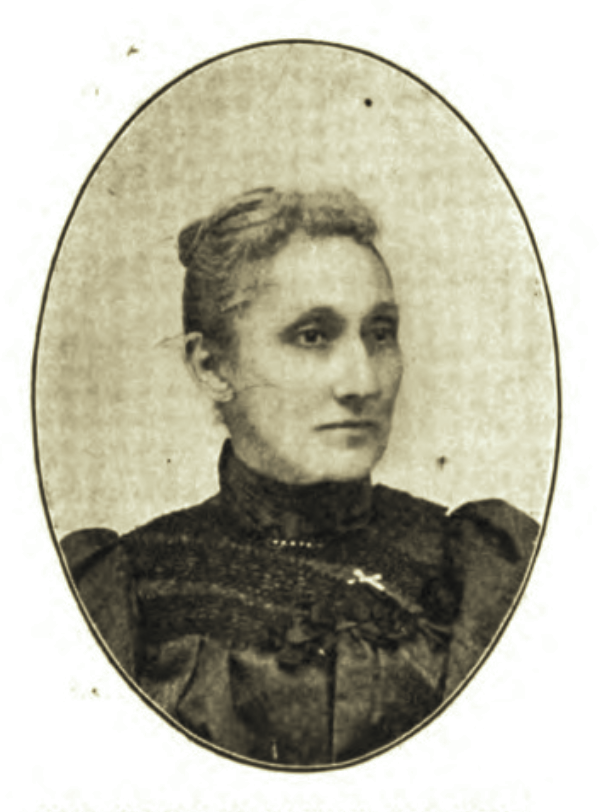
Marion H. Dunham

Dunham wrote and spoke much on the suffrage issue. She was a Christian socialist, deeply interested in all reforms that promised to better the social system and the conditions of life for the multitudes. Dunham served as Corresponding Secretary of the Women's National Socialist Union.

== Personal life ==
Some years before her death, she resigned her official positions and took up her residence in Los Angeles, California.

Marion Howard Dunham died in Los Angeles, December 27, 1921, and was buried at Forest Lawn Cemetery, December 31, 1921. (Note: According to Cherrington (1924), Dunham died in 1922, but that was obviously a mistake as evidenced by her death certificate and the December 30, 1921 newspaper announcement about her burial.)
