= Mary Allen West =

American journalist, editor, educator, philanthropist and superintendent

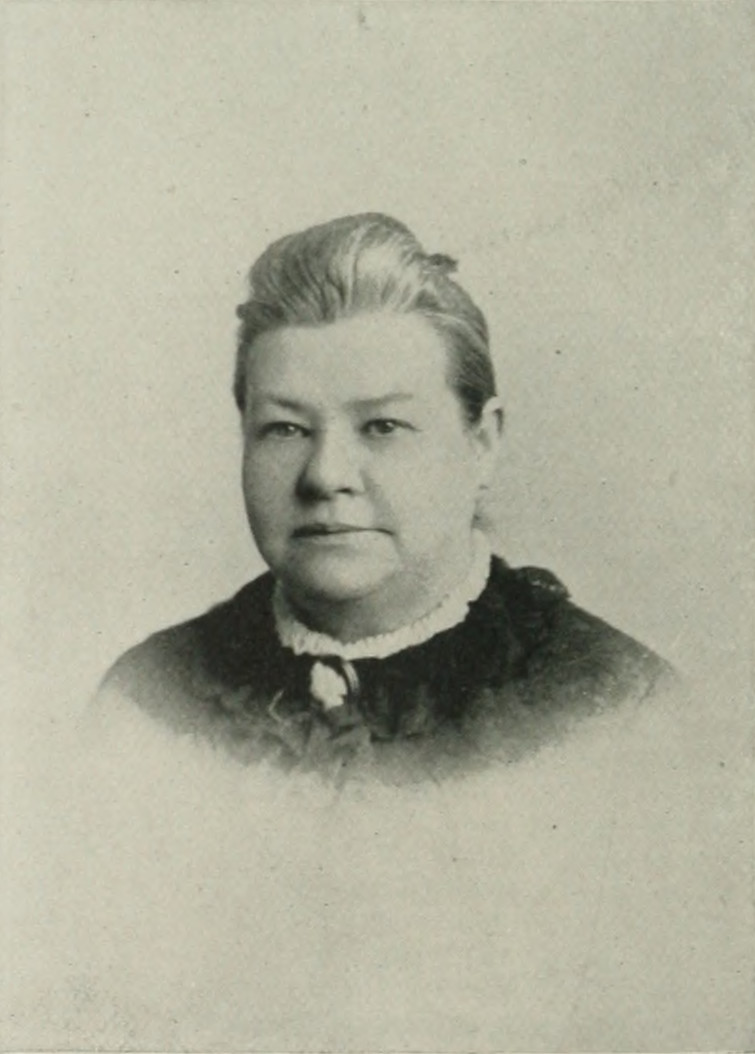
- Photo in A Woman of the Century
- Born: July 13, 1837; Galesburg, Illinois, U.S.
- Died: December 1, 1892 (aged 65); Japan
- Occupations: journalist, editor, educator, philanthropist, superintendent of schools, temperance worker
- Writing career
- Language: English
- Notable work: Childhood: Its Care and Culture (1887)

Signature
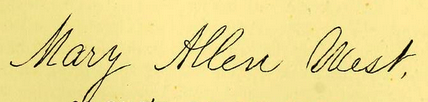

Mary Allen West (July 13, 1837 – December 1, 1892) was an American journalist, editor, educator, philanthropist, superintendent of schools, and temperance worker. A teacher in her early career, she served as superintendent of schools in Knox County, Illinois, being one of the first women to fill such a position in Illinois. An active supporter of the temperance movement, West served as president of the Illinois Woman's Christian Temperance Union (WCTU), and editor of the national paper, Union Signal. Her other roles within the WCTU included superintendent of the Training School for Temperance Workers, Illinois State Superintendent of Temperance in Schools of Higher Education, and Stockholder, Director, and Secretary of the Woman's Publication Association. She was the first president of the Illinois Woman's Press Association, a member of the Chicago Woman's Club, and director of the Protective Agency for Women and Children. West was the author of Childhood: Its Care and Culture (1887). She died in Japan, in 1892, while training temperance workers in organization and promotion reform efforts.

== Early life and education ==
Mary Allen West was born in Galesburg, Illinois, July 13, 1837; she was the first child born in this city. Her parents were among the founders of Knox College, one of the earliest collegiate institutions in the Mississippi Valley. The parents came from New York and founded Galesburg with George Washington Gale, Sylvanus Ferris, and Thomas Simmons.

West was a healthy, vigorous, studious child who matured early, both mentally and physically. She passed the examinations that qualified her to enter Knox Female Seminary at age 13. She taught for two years at Robbins School in Sparta Township, Illinois until she was old enough to enter Knox Female Seminary. She graduated at 17.

== Career ==
=== Educator ===
Immediately after graduation, she began to teach school, which she then believed to be her life work. Successful in teaching and influential in educational circles, West earned a reputation as a "lady of grit, grace, and gumption." Despite refusing to run for the position, she was elected to the office of superintendent of schools in Knox County, Illinois in 1873. This made her one of the first women to fill such a position in Illinois. She served in that capacity for nine years and resigned on accepting the presidency of the Illinois WCTU.

She attended many educational conventions and was a power in them, and continually wrote for school and other journals. She thus showed herself to have the capacity for almost unlimited hard work. Home duties were at that time pressing heavily, including as they did the care and nursing of an invalid mother and sister. She occupied a prominent social position, and her work included Sunday-school teaching.

=== Journalist and editor ===
When the American Civil War broke out, she worked earnestly in organizing women into aid societies to assist the Sanitary Commission. Her first editorial work was at long range, as she edited in Illinois the Home Magazine, which was published nearly 1,000 miles (1,600 km) away, in Philadelphia. Later, she left writing for active work in the temperance movement throughout Illinois. After the organization of the WCTU, West became an earnest worker in the cause. She assisted in organizing the women of Illinois, and in a short time became their State president. In that office, she traveled extensively throughout Illinois.

She wrote scores of leaflets and pamphlets, all strong and terse, including "Our Toiling Children" with Florence Kelley. Other leaflets included "Organization", "Gospel Meetings, Band of Hope, Temperance Literature", "Scientific Temperance Literature", and "Temperance in Public Schools".

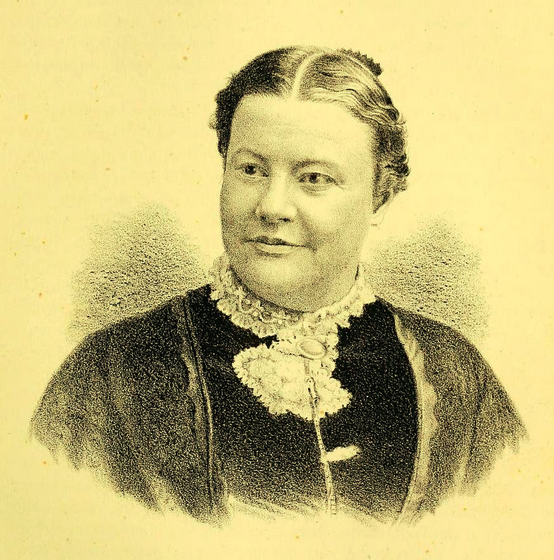
(1878)

While she was State president of the WCTU, she was often called upon to "help out" in the editorial labors of Mary Bannister Willard, the editor of the Union Signal, published in Chicago. Later, it was merged with Our Union, becoming the Union Signal, under the editorship of Willard. During this time, she also served as the superintendent of the Training School for Temperance Workers, Illinois State Superintendent of Temperance in Schools of Higher Education, as well as Stockholder, Director, and Secretary of the Woman's Publication Association.

Before Willard went to Germany to reside, West removed to Chicago, and accepted the position of editor-in-chief of the Union Signal, with Elizabeth Wheeler Andrew as her assistant. As editor of that paper, the organ of the national and the world's Woman's Christian Temperance Union, West had great responsibilities. The paper had a circulation of nearly 100,000 women. The women of the WCTU repeatedly endorsed West's policy and conduct of the paper.

=== Illinois Woman's Press Association ===
After moving to Chicago, West became involved with the newly organized Illinois Woman's Press Association. She served five consecutive terms as its president, guiding the organization through its early years and establishing several new operational branches.

== Personal life ==
She was a member of the Chicago Woman's Club, and an effective director of the Protective Agency for Women and Children, but the strain of that work proved too great, and she has stepped outside its directorship, although remaining an ardent upholder of the agency. Her heart was in her Galesburg home, the home of her childhood and youth, and when she allowed herself a holiday, it was to spend a few days there. West, in 1892, visited California, the Sandwich Islands, and Japan in the interests of temperance work, arriving in Yokohama in September. She died in Japan before the end of the year, and is buried in Hope Cemetery, Galesburg.

== Legacy ==
Mary Allen West Tower, the tallest building in Galesburg, provides subsidized housing for older and disabled adults.

== Selected works ==
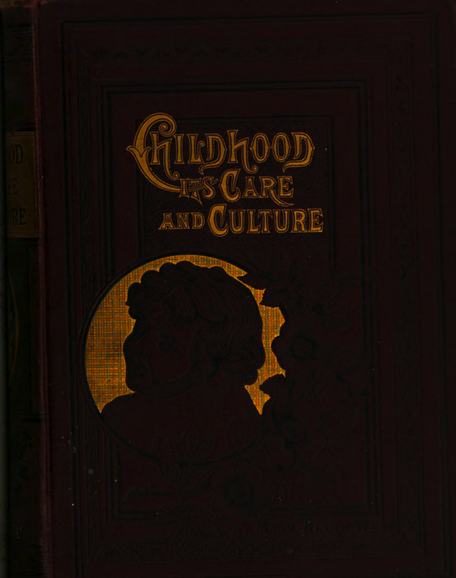
Childhood: Its Care and Culture (1887)

- Childhood: its care and culture (1887)
