= Esther Pugh =

American temperance reformer (1834–1908)

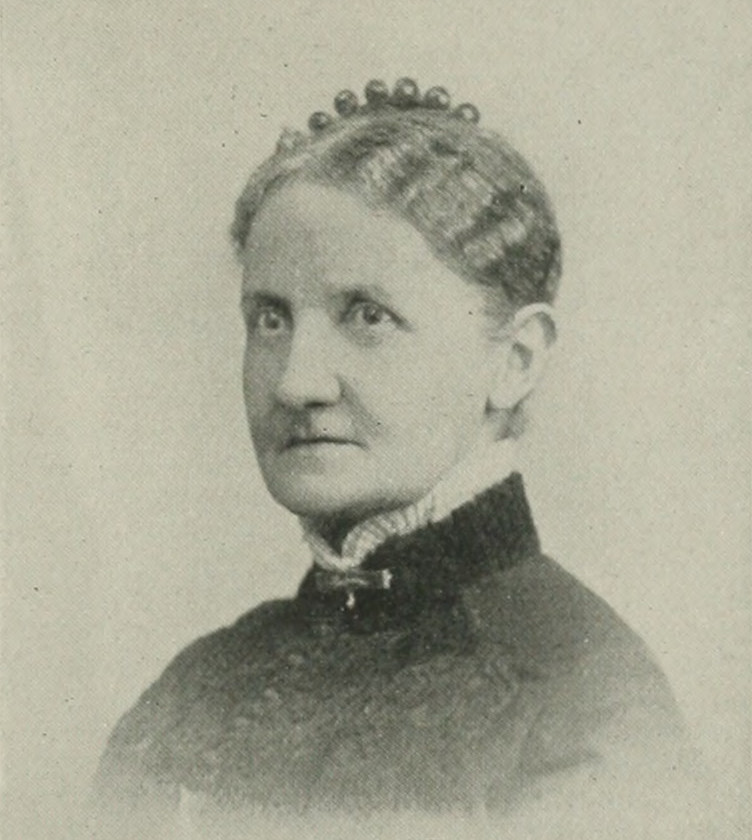
- Photo in A Woman of the Century
- Born: August 31, 1834 Cincinnati, Ohio, U.S.
- Died: March 29, 1908 (aged 73) Philadelphia, Pennsylvania, U.S.
- Occupation: reformer; editor; publisher

Signature
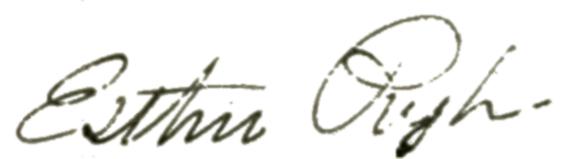

Esther Pugh (August 31, 1834 – March 29, 1908) was an American temperance reformer of the long nineteenth century. She served as Treasurer of the National Woman's Christian Temperance Union (WCTU) and was a Trustee of Earlham College. Pugh edited and published the monthly temperance journal, Our Union.

== Early life and education ==
Esther Pugh, daughter of Achilles and Anna Maria Pugh, was born in Cincinnati, Ohio, August 31, 1834. Her parents were Quakers. For many years, the father was a journalist in Cincinnati, and publisher of the Chronicle.

Pugh received a good education.

== Career ==
Early on, Pugh became interested in moral reforms, and soon became prominent in the temperance movement. She was one of the leaders in the movement, joining the WCTU during its first meetings. She served as Treasurer of the National WCTU for 15 years, and her management style repeatedly aided the national order in passing through financial difficulties. Considered to be a clear and forcible orator, she traveled for temperance work throughout the U.S. and Canada, lecturing and organizing unions. Pugh's association with Frances E. Willard was enduring.

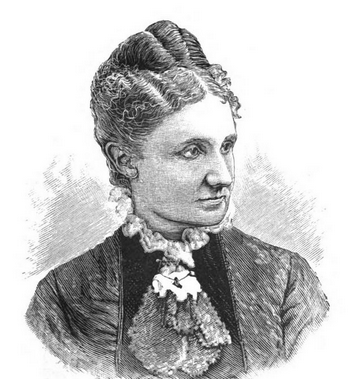
From an 1888 publication

Succeeding Mary Towne Burt, Pugh served as publisher and editor of the monthly temperance journal, Our Union, for years. According to Gifford (1995), Pugh, Frances H. Rastall and Caroline Buell used The Union Signal (the paper's name after its merger with The Signal) to promote their private businesses. Because of her journalistic experience, Pugh was called upon to provide guidance for the Women's Home Missionary Society of the Methodist Episcopal Church's periodical, Woman's Home Missions, regarding typeset and how to make up a "dummy".

Pugh's work in the WCTU, beginning in Cincinnati, caused her residence at different times to be in Columbus, Ohio, Cleveland, Ohio, Brooklyn, New York, and Chicago, Illinois, though made her home is in Evanston, Illinois. She served an Elder in the Friends church. She was appointed a Trustee of Earlham College by Indiana Yearly Meeting, and held that position until failing health made it necessary for her to resign.

== Death ==
Esther Pugh died in Philadelphia, Pennsylvania, March 29, 1908. The funeral service was held at the home of her sister, Mary T. Wildman, in Philadelphia. Pugh was buried either in Waynesville, Ohio or in Corwin, Ohio at Miami Cemetery.
