= Margaret E. Winslow =

- Born: Margaret Elizabeth Winslow; 1836; New York City, New York, U.S.
- Died: 1936 (aged 99–100)
- Education: Abbot Institution, Packer Collegiate Institute
- Occupations: activist, editor, author
- Writing career
- Language: English
- Genres: non-fiction, religion, poetry, hymns
- Movement: temperance

Margaret E. Winslow (1836-1936) was an American activist, newspaper editor, and author of several temperance books. She served at two separate times, and during the longest period of any editor-in-chief of Our Union, the national organ of the Woman's Christian Temperance Union (WCTU). It was a burst of inspiration from Winslow, relative to its simplicity and purity, which at the National WCTU Convention in Chicago determined the union to wear the white ribbon as a badge rather than the red, white, and blue which was strongly urged by many.

== Early years and education ==
Margaret Elizabeth Winslow was born in New York City, in 1836. She was of Puritan antecedents, and spent most of her life in Brooklyn, and Saugerties on the Hudson River. Winslow signed the pledge and wrote temperance compositions when but eight years old. At fifteen, she declined to come into the parlor on New Year's Day if wine was offered, and carried her point. She was educated partly at the Abbot Institution in New York, and partly at Packer Collegiate Institute, of which she was a graduate.

== Career ==
=== Teacher ===
For twelve years, Winslow taught at Packer Institute. The last year of her stay, she held the position of composition teacher, and had charge of the Art Department of Pictures, Coins, and so forth. At the age of nineteen, she united with the Episcopal church, of which she remained a loyal member. She spent 1869–70 in Europe studying and traveling in England, France, Italy, and Germany. She became acquainted with many foreign Protestants, and on coming home was made one of Albert Woodruffs "Foreign Sunday School Association" (Italian Committee).

=== Activist ===
The Women's Crusade (1873–74) in Ohio roused her interest and enthusiasm. Dr. Diocletian Lewis came to Brooklyn fresh from the great awakening in Ohio. The Packer Institute teacher attended several temperance prayer-meetings, and was present at the one (March 17, 1874) at which the first Brooklyn WCTU was organized. Desiring to attend the daily meetings which followed, she persuaded the editor of the New York Witness to accept reports, and every day for fourteen weeks, went directly from school to the YMCA in Brooklyn, where these meetings were held. Here was uttered her first public testimony for Christ. One evening, Winslow went with fifteen women to a prayer meeting in a liquor saloon. In a letter to one of her friends she thus graphically describes the scene:—

"I shall never forget that sight. Before us was a barricade of tables smeared with deadly-looking rings. From the walls large pictures looked down upon us, such pictures as I had never seen before. The room was thronged with men and boys, and the hall whose door was open behind us, with women and girls of the lowest description. The front room was separated by a screen, over and between the interstices of which gleamed curious eyes and grimy hands. The meeting began; there was singing and prayer, the ladies spoke, one after another, in the old prayer-meeting fashion, with shut eyes, trembling and tear-choked voices. The audience became disorderly. Boys tripped each other up, girls tittered, and a drunken man in the middle made faces, to the great distress of a sweet little girl of seven, who accompanied him. The leader of the meeting whispered to me, "Can't you say something?" "I,—" was my exclamation, drawing myself up, "I speak in meeting; I, an Episcopal lady?" "Why did you come then?" she asked, sadly. And I thought, " Why did I come, indeed? was it from curiosity only? I profess to hold in my hand and heart the one divine remedy for all the crime and misery in this world, part of which is now before me, and conventionality shut my lips from offering it as I felt I could!" In an instant I was on my feet. I felt as though invisible hands lifted me there. I was conscious that those hundreds of eyes were all fastened upon me; there was a dead silence, and I found myself not talking temperance, but painting a word picture of the crucified Christ. Sixteen of the saloon habitues present that night were, as we had reason to hope, converted during the following week. This was my ordination."

From that time, Winslow spoke at temperance gatherings, missions, prisons, and other places, in Brooklyn and elsewhere. She also took part in Dwight L. Moody's work in Brooklyn, and later in New York. Later on, she went to Florida. In 1877, at the National WCTU Convention in Farwell Hall, Chicago, there was much controversy as to what should be the badge of the WCTU. Some advocated royal purple, and some the red, white and blue. The committee first recommended a badge of royal purple and violet; this was amended to a bow of white ribbon with a cross of red and an anchor of blue combined, woven in the fabric and stamped with the initials, “W. C. T. U.” Winslow rose at the crisis of the debate and made an inspired speech on the superior symbolic meaning of the white ribbon as the badge. She moved to substitute a bow of white ribbon with “W. C. T. U.” in gold letters. After much discussion, this was finally adopted by the convention.

=== Editor, writer ===
Winslow attended the National WCTU Convention held in Newark, 1876, where she was chosen editor of Our Union. She declined re-appointment to the position for a principle— because she objected to the Home Protection movement. Becoming somewhat less conservative, she accepted this position again in 1880, and retained it until the paper was united with The Union Signal in 1883.

In 1880, Winslow began writing for the press, her works appearing in the New York Observer, New York Evangelist, Independent, Christian Union, Churchman, Christian at Work, Christian Advocate, Christian Register, Sunday School Times, and St. Nicholas. She was the author of five or six story books, published by the National Temperance Society, American Sunday School Union, and others. She also wrote poetry, and lyrics to hymns, including "Intercede for Us", "Waiting for Thy Coming", and "We Shall Know Each Other There".

She died in 1936.

== Selected works ==
- Life Among the Red Men
- A More Excellent Way; and Other Incidents in the Women's Gospel Temperance Movement in America, 1878
- Save the Boys, 1883
- Katie Robertson (New York: A. L. Burt, 1885)
- Three Years at Glenwood, 1885
- Sketch of the Life, Character and Work of Alonzo Crittenden, 1885
- Under Ban (New York: National Temperance Society and Publication House, 1885)
- The Sewells or To Every Man His Work (Congregational Sunday-School and Publishing society, 1887)
- Miss Malcolm's Ten, 1892
- The Secret of Victory
- Saved
- Barford Mills
- Michael Ellis’ Text
- Saved from the Street
- West Beach Boys
- Three Girls in Italy
- Marion's Temptation
