= Mary Towne Burt =

American temperance reformer, newspaper publisher, benefactor

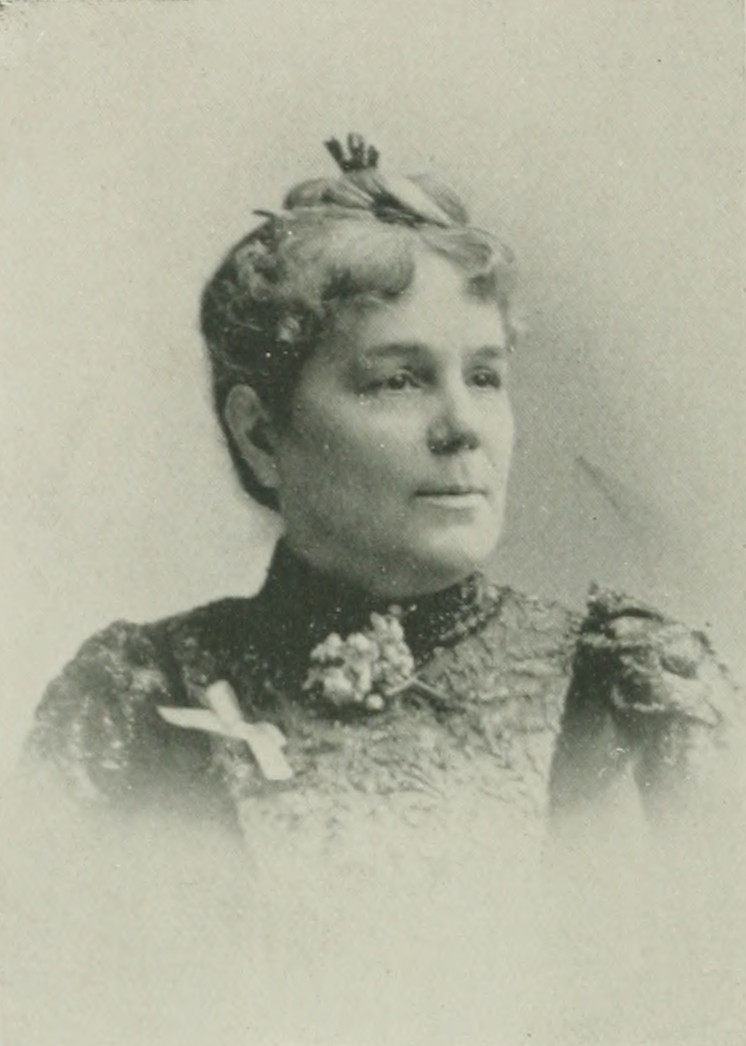
- Photo in A Woman of the Century
- Born: March 28, 1842; Cincinnati, Ohio, U.S.
- Died: April 29, 1898 (aged 56); New York City, U.S.
- Education: Auburn Young Ladies' Institute
- Occupations: temperance reformer, newspaper publisher, editor, benefactor
- Spouse: Edward Burt

Mary Towne Burt (née, Towne; March 28, 1842 – April 29, 1898) was a 19th-century American temperance reformer, newspaper publisher, and benefactor from Ohio. Burt was identified with temperance work nearly all her life. She was the first president of the Auburn, New York branch of the Women's Christian Temperance Union, and beginning in 1882, served as president of the New York State Society of the Union. In 1875, she became the publisher, and subsequently the editor, of Our Union, the organ of the society, and in 1878–80 was the corresponding secretary of the National Union. For several years, Burt had charge of the legislative interests of the union, and several laws for the protection of women and young girls resulted from her efforts.

== Early life and education ==
Mary Towne was born on March 28, 1842, Cincinnati, Ohio, of English-American parentage. Her father, Thomas Towne, was educated in England for the Episcopal ministry. He died when she was four years old, on a return voyage from England, which he had visited on business. Age the age of 12, Burt, her mother, and her siblings, an older sister, Mrs. Pomeroy of Chicago, and a younger brother, moved to Auburn, New York.

Until 16, she attended the public schools of Auburn. She then became a pupil of Professor M. L. Browne, at the Auburn Young Ladies' Institute. Here her talents made her an especial favorite, and Professor Browne offered her every facility if she would remain with him, but this was not practicable. Her home, at this time was with her uncle, John T. Baker, who, with his wife, were her guardians.

== Career ==
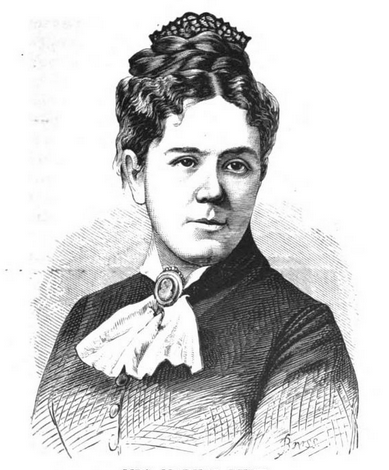

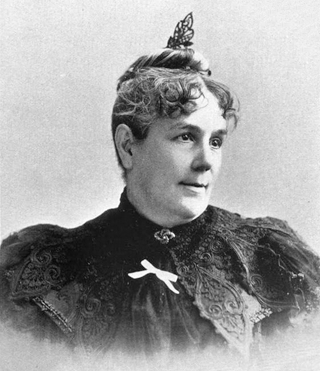

Four years after leaving school, she married Edward Burt, son of one of Auburn's oldest residents. Soon after this, she was confirmed a member of the Protestant Episcopal Church by the venerable Bishop Coxe. For a long time, she was much withdrawn from society by frail health, and studied in the solitude of her home. Her husband's health also failing, in 1872, they spent three months at Nassau.

=== Activism and publishing ===
When the temperance crusade swept the country, it aroused Burt, as it did thousands of others. Temperance was not new to her; her father and mother were both strong advocates, and the principles had been instilled into her as a child. Her mother (now residing with her) gave her full support to all of Burt's ambition. Her efforts on behalf of temperance occurred without intermission, with the exception of seven months spent in the sick room of her sister, Mrs. Pomeroy.

She engaged the Opera House and delivered a lecture on temperance, March 24, 1874, Professor Browne, her former instructor, presiding. Immediately after, in Auburn, a Woman's Christian Temperance Union (WCTU) was organized and Burt elected president, which position she held two years. When a call was made to a national council in Cleveland, in the autumn of 1874, Burt was made one of the Secretaries, thus coming to the front in the National Union at its inception. During the winter of 1875, Mr. and Mrs. Burt removed to Brooklyn.

In the fall of 1876, in the Newark, New Jersey, national convention, she was elected a member of the publishing committee of the Woman's Temperance Union, the first official organ of the National union. She was afterwards made chairman of that committee and first publisher of the paper, an organ of the Woman's Temperance Publishing Association. In thus taking charge of an enterprise very dear to her, her success proved her qualification for the task. The paper had been started; was almost an experiment; had no capital but the love and faith of the WCTU, and was largely in debt. She took hold of the enterprise, enlarged and improved the paper in many ways, pushed its interests; and during the subsequent year, its subscription list was nearly doubled. During the year 1877, she assumed the position of managing editor. At her suggestion the name Our Union was given to the paper, a name which it held until its consolidation with the Signal, of Chicago, when it took the name of The Union Signal. In Chicago, in 1877, she was elected corresponding secretary of the National Union, which office she held for three years, and during that term of office, she opened the first headquarters of the National union in the Bible House, New York City.

=== President of the New York State Union ===
Burt was identified with the New York State union since its inception. As its recording secretary for the first seven years of its existence, she had much to do with shaping its aims and its policy. After serving one year as corresponding secretary, she was elected president in 1882, at the convention in Oswego, New York. At that time, the state union had a membership of about 3,000, with but 13 of the 60 counties organized. During the years of her presidency, all the remaining counties but one were organized, and the membership went up to 22,000.

In her first annual address, she recommended a change in the form of the executive committee, substituting for the three previously elected by ballot, in addition to the general officers, the vice-presidents of the state, who were the presidents of the county unions. This changed the possible numbers of the executive committee from seven to 64. Other measures recommended by her were the publication of a state paper, the opening of state headquarters in New York City, securing permanent headquarters, putting up a building on the permanent state fair grounds at Syracuse, New York, creating the departments of Non-Alcoholics in Medicine and Rescue Work for Girls, the memorializing of the Democratic and Republican parties in behalf of prohibition and for the enfranchisement of woman, and petitioning the constitutional convention of 1894 for the last two purposes.

For some years, she had charge of the legislative interests. In 1885–87, she was superintendent of the Department of Social Purity, and at once entered upon a campaign to raise "the age of consent" for young girls. In 1887, this effort was successful, the legislature raising the age from 10 years to 16 years. In 1891–92, she led in the legislative work that resulted in the closing of the New York State exhibit at the World's Fair on Sundays, and in the passage of the bill prohibiting the employment of barmaids in saloons. She also led in the protest against the excise bill which resulted in the modification of some of its worst features.

As an organizer, she was indefatigable. Nothing stopped her from meeting with women and explaining the methods of temperance work, while she quickly selected those best fitted to become leaders. She presided at the organization of a large proportion of the county unions. The personal acquaintance with the active members thus gained, greatly aided her in the selection of superintendents and committees, so far as it fell to the president to make such selections.

In other enterprises, she showed similar ability. The erection of a permanent building on the state fair grounds at Syracuse was one of them as the WCTU had secured the passage in the state legislature of a law prohibiting the sale of intoxicating liquors on the state and county fair grounds within its jurisdiction, the carrying out of which policy changed the character and conduct of agricultural fairs in New York. For several years, Burt took an active interest in the WCTU work at the state fair grounds at Syracuse, which overtaxed her health and physical strength.

== Personal life ==
Burt, with her husband and son, resided in New York. She was a member of the Episcopal Church.

Mary Towne Burt's sudden death occurred in New York City, on April 29, 1898.

== Selected works ==
- Address at the twenty-second annual convention, September 24–26, 1895, Central Presbyterian Church, Rochester, N.Y. (1895)
