= Rideout =

Rideout is a surname. Notable people with the surname include:

- Alice Rideout (born 1874), American sculptor
- Bonnie Rideout (born 1962), American fiddler
- George Rideout (born 1945), Canadian politician
- Henry Milner Rideout (1877–1927), American author
- J. K. Rideout (1912–1950), British linguist
- Janet Rideout (born 1939), American chemist
- John Rideout, American defendant
- Jordan Rideout (born 1993), English footballer
- Kyle Rideout (born 1984), Canadian actor
- Lisa Rideout, Canadian filmmaker
- Margaret Rideout (1923–2010), Canadian politician
- Nancie Rideout (1938–1996), American water skier
- Patricia Rideout-Rosenberg (1931–2006), Canadian music educator
- Paul Rideout (born 1964), English footballer
- Sherwood Rideout (1917–1964), Canadian politician
- Tanis Rideout, Canadian writer
- Tom Rideout (born 1948), Canadian politician, Premier of Newfoundland
- Vincent C. Rideout (1914–2003), Canadian-American computer engineer

== Fictional characters ==
- Jennifer T. Rideout from the American young fantasy novel Summerland (2002)

== Places ==
- Rideout Island, Nunavut, Canada (now known as Aupilaktuq)
- Rideout Memorial Hospital in Marysville, California, U.S. (now known as Adventist Health and Rideout)
- Rideout, Ontario, Canada (part of the city of Kenora)

== Disambiguation pages ==
- Leon Rideout (disambiguation)

== See also ==
- Ridout
