= Board of Lady Managers of the World's Columbian Exposition =

American women's organization

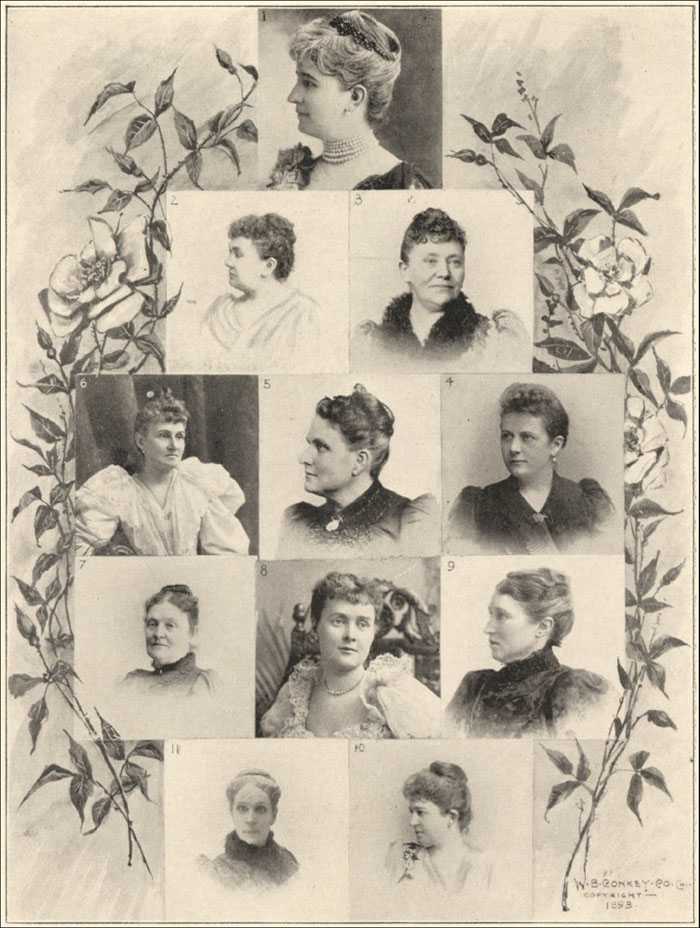
Officers of Board of Lady Managers

The Board of Lady Managers of the World's Columbian Exposition was organized November 19, 1890. It oversaw the construction of The Woman's Building in Chicago and organized the exposition's World's Congress of Representative Women (1893). A cookbook with autographed recipes of board members was also issued.

The Board of Lady Managers was created by the U.S. Congress to see that women were placed upon the Juries of Award, which were to pass upon work done wholly or in part by women, and to perform such other duties as might be assigned by the Exposition's National Commission. It was subsequently given by the Commission full management and control of the building known as the Woman's Building, together with the general charge and management of the interests of women in all of the Exposition buildings. It was made the official channel of communication through which all women or organizations of women were to be brought into relation with the Exposition, and through which applications for space for women or their exhibits should be received. The members of the Board succeeded in securing for women the fullest possible representation in the department buildings, and modified their original plans in order to increase the amount of space to be put at their disposal in the Woman's Building.

== Origins ==
Beginning in 1889, activist women in Chicago lobbied to make their city the site of the world's fair of 1892. They also petitioned for an official place for women in the planning and exhibitions at the fair. Led by Emma Gilson Wallace, they suggested forming a "Women's Department for the Fair". These activists came from various women's organizations involved in philanthropy, education, and suffrage.

The Quatro-Centennial Committee of the Senate (i.e. commemorating the 400th anniversary of Columbus's first voyage to the New World) approved the Fair Bill naming Chicago as the site. When the bill was sent to the House of Representatives, William McKendree Springer attached an amendment to create a Board of Lady Managers. The House accepted the bill and in 1890 President Benjamin Harrison signed the bill into law.

The Board appointments, made by the National Commission, numbered 117, including two Lady Managers from each state, territory and the District of Columbia, as well as members-at-large. Among their duties related to the Fair, the Lady Managers were in charge of the plans for the Women's Hall.

== Administration ==
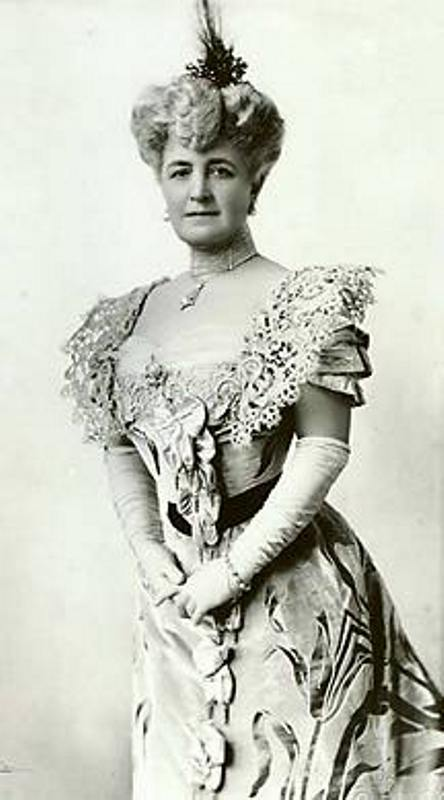
Bertha Palmer, president

There were five convenings of the Board:

- First Session, November 19–26, 1890
- Second Session, September 2–9, 1891
- Third Session, October 1892
- Fourth Session, April 1893
- Fifth Session, July 1893

The by-laws of the Board of Lady Managers, as amended, included provisions for an official title, quorum, powers of alternate managers, officers of the board, an executive committee, duties of the board president, duties of the board vice-presidents, duties of the board secretary, vice-chair of the executive committee, and amendments.

== The Woman's Building ==
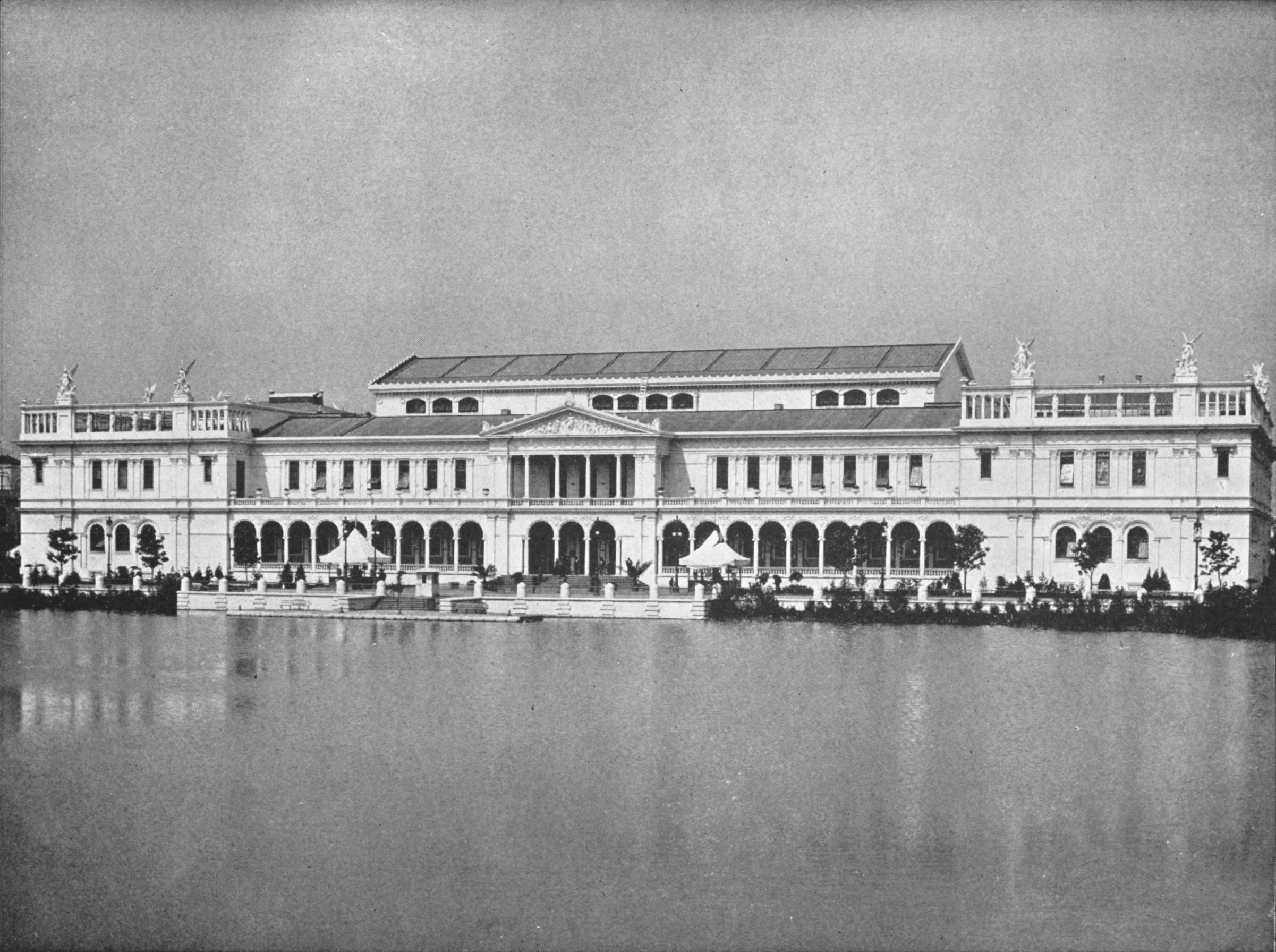
Woman's Building designed by Sophia Hayden

Bertha Honoré Palmer served as the president of the 117-woman strong Board of Lady Managers, the organization which dealt with women's business at the World's Columbian Exposition. The Board constructed The Woman's Building, designed by 21-year-old Sophia Hayden, as the showplace for women's art. The building itself was decorated by women artists, featuring architectural ornament sculpted by Enid Yandell and Alice Rideout, both 19, and a large painting by Mary Cassatt, Modern Woman, one of two extensive murals in the Woman's Building, the other one, Primitive Woman being by Mary MacMonnies. Interior art was curated by Candace Wheeler and Sara Hallowell. The Board also built a Children's Building, a child-care center required to support fair-goers and convention-goers who brought children. As well, the Board built a women's dormitory near the fairgrounds, to house women traveling alone or with small children.

== Legacy ==
Carrie V. Shuman compiled a cookbook, Favorite Dishes: A Columbian Autograph Souvenir Cookery Book. Over three hundred autograph recipes, and twenty-three portraits, contributed specially by the Board of Lady Managers of the World's Columbia Exposition (Chicago, 1893) with illustrations by May Root-Kern, Mellie Ingels Julian, Louis Braunhold, and George Wharton Edwards.

After the exposition, the Woman's Building was torn down, and the mural by Mary Cassatt was misplaced and lost. Bertha Palmer was appointed United States Commissioner at the Paris Exposition of 1900 by President William McKinley, the only woman so distinguished by any government.

== Notable people ==
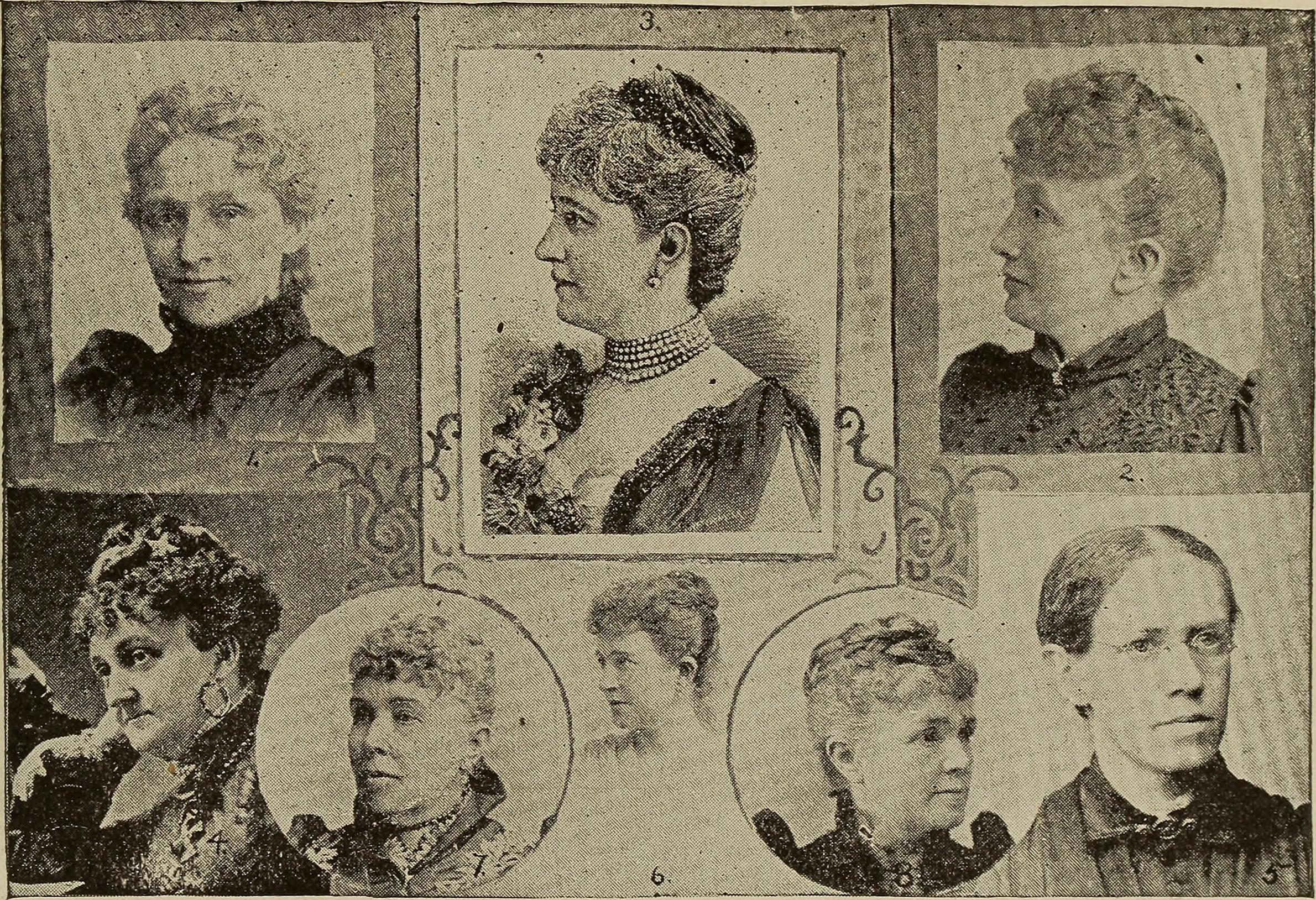
Board of Lady Managers

=== Officers ===
Prominent officials:

- Mrs. Bertha Palmer – President
- Mrs. Susan G. Cook – Secretary
- Phoebe Couzins, Secretary
- Mrs. V.C. Meredith – Vice Chairman Executive Committee
- Mrs. Russell B. Harrington – Vice-president at Large
- Mrs. John A. Logan – Vice-chairman Committee on Ceremonies

Vice-presidents:

- Mrs. Ralph Trautman – First Vice-president
- Mrs. Edwin C. Burleigh – Second Vice-president
- Mrs. Charles Price – Third Vice-president
- Miss K.L. Minor – Fourth Vice-president
- Mrs. Beriah Wilkins – Fifth Vice-president
- Mrs. Susan R. Ashley – Sixth Vice-president
- Mrs. Flora Beall Ginty – Seventh Vice-president
- Mrs. Margaret Blaine Salisbury – Eighth Vice-president

=== Committee on Congresses ===
- Susan R. Ashley
- Frances Elizabeth Newbury Bagley, Vice-chair
- Helen Morton Barker
- Laurette Lovell
- Mary Kavanaugh Eagle , Chair
- Eliza M. Russell
- Julia Ball Reed Shattuck
- Lillian M. N. Stevens

=== Members ===
- Alice Barbee Castleman, Kentucky
- Mary A. Cochran, Texas
- Ellen M. Chandler, Vermont
- Mrs. John Sergeant Wise, Virginia
- Mrs. K. S. G. Paul, Virginia
- Melissa D. Owings, Washington
- Alice Houghton, Washington
- Mrs. W. Newton Linch, West Virginia
- Lily Irene Jackson, West Virginia
- Flora Beall Ginty, Wisconsin
- Mrs. William P. Lynde, Wisconsin
- Mrs. F. H. Harrison, Wyoming
- Frances E. Hale, Wyoming

=== Resident members ===
- Helen Morton Barker
- Mrs. Matilda B. Carse
- Dr. Frances Dickenson
- Mrs. James R. Doolittle Jr.
- Mrs. James A. Mulligan
- Mrs. Potter Palmer
- Mrs. Leander Stone
- Mrs. L. Brace Shattuck
- Mrs. Solomon Thacher Jr.
- Mrs. M.R.M. Wallace
