= Ridout =

Ridout is a surname. Notable people with the surname include:

- Alan Ridout (1934–1996), British composer and teacher
- Alexandra Ridout (born 1998), British jazz trumpeter
- Dudley Ridout (1866–1941), British soldier
- George Percival Ridout (1807–1873), British-Canadian merchant and politician
- Godfrey Ridout (1918–1984), Canadian composer and teacher
- Heather Ridout (born 1954), Australian businesswoman
- Herbert C. Ridout (1881–1948), British journalist and writer
- John Ridout (died 1817), Canadian duel victim
- Louis Ridout (born 1990), English bowls player
- Matilda Ridout Edgar (1844–1910), Canadian historian and feminist
- Ronald Ridout (1916–1994), British textbook author
- Thomas Ridout (disambiguation), several people
- Timothy Ridout (born 1995), British violist

== See also ==
- Rideout
