= In a Monastery Garden =

Piece of classical music

- Light music by Albert Ketèlbey
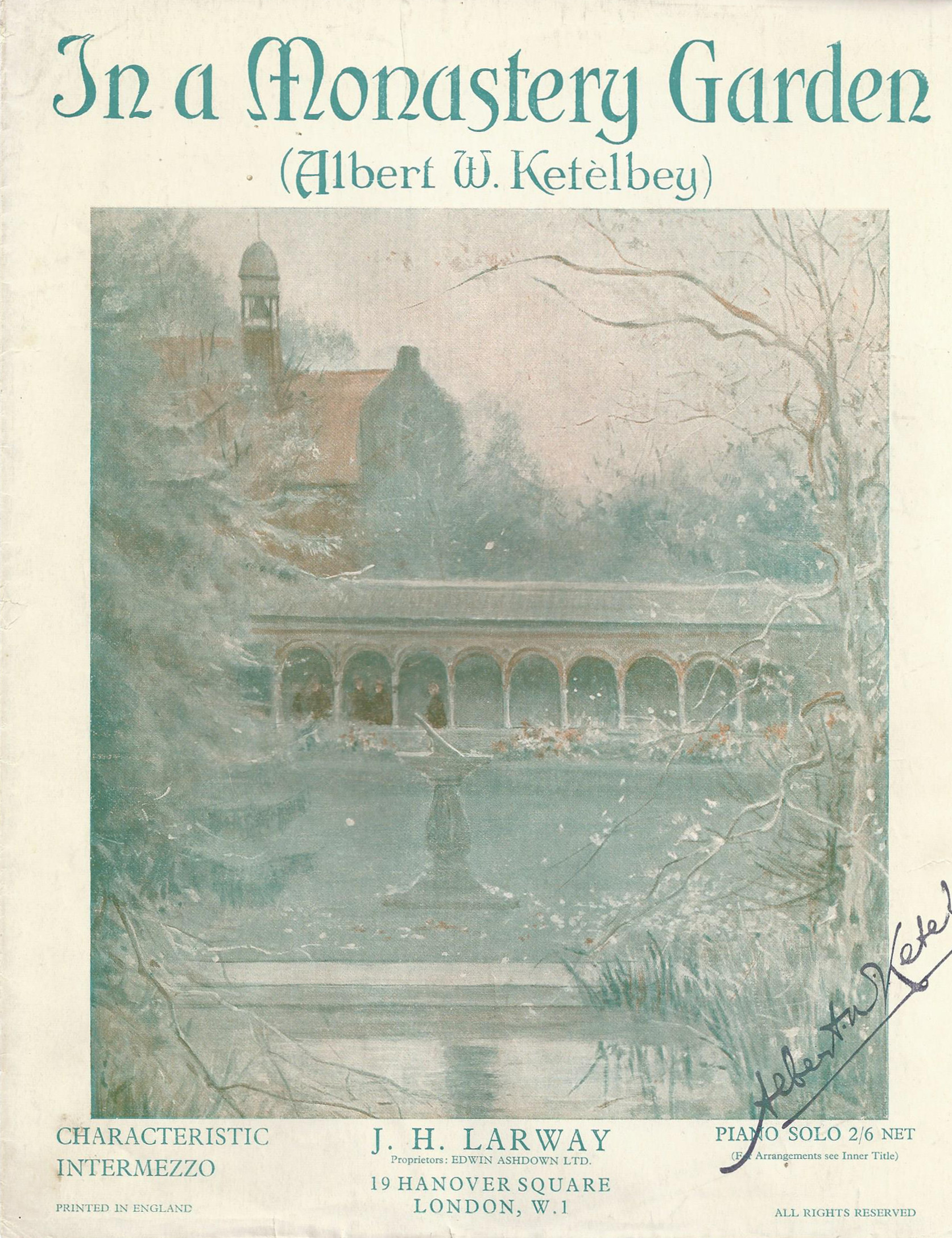
- Cover of the sheet music
- Composed: 1915
- Published: 1915
- Scoring: orchestra; optional chorus

In a Monastery Garden is a piece of light classical music by Albert Ketèlbey, who composed it in 1915 after a visit to a real monastic garden, now the Benedictine monastery of St Augustine's Abbey, Chilworth in Surrey. It was especially successful when performed by siffleur Ronnie Ronalde who often performed it as his finale and sold over a million recordings.

== Origin ==
There are conflicting accounts of the origins of this piece. Here are four accounts:

1. From Franciscans Here and There, no.34:

During Fr. Edgar's noviciate... a visit was made to Chilworth in 1910 by Fr. Edgar's brother, Joseph. The latter, as J.H. Larway, was a well-known music publisher... He brought with him to Chilworth on this 1910 visit a man who was at that time distinguished as a composer, conductor and musical editor: Albert Ketelbey... Joseph Larway and Albert Ketelbey were taken round the friary and grounds of Chilworth. During the tour of the woods Ketelbey turned to Joseph Larway and said "I've got an idea. If I put it on paper, will you publish it." The idea or inspiration was In a Monastery Garden.

Between one thing and another some time elapsed before the various parts were ready for publication... In 1915 Joseph Larway... took out the copyright...

What was the surprise Fr. Edgar had in store for his guests at the 1959 Jubilee of his 50 years in the Order? Notwithstanding the many moves a friar may have in 50 years Fr. Edgar went up to his cell to bring down a remnant he had stored, and saved from the wreck of many moves. It was the score of the original MS of Ketelbey's In a Monastery Garden... Asked if he would mind this original score going into the archives of the Province, Fr. Edgar not only agreed, but agreed most willingly, and handed over the MS, which was once described in a musical review as "touching the hearts of millions of people"...

2. This account is included in the article In a Monastery Garden, by Albert W. Ketèlbey, in Music Masterpieces, Part 12, 18 March 1926, page 183:

It is highly necessary to feel what one writes, and also to have the right kind of inspiration. When I was writing In a Monastery Garden, one of my most popular compositions, I was for the time being an imaginary monk, and as in my earlier days I had had certain ascetic inclinations it was not difficult to get myself into a suitable frame of mind. The first inspiration to write the piece came to me during a visit to Scarborough. I happened to drive over to Bridlington one day, and on the way I visited a beautiful old monastery. Its quietude and its aloofness from the gaiety of the world at its doors seemed to cry aloud for expression through the medium of the orchestra. I had an idea, and when I returned home I set to work to draw a musical picture of the scene as it had impressed itself upon my mind - the chanting of the monks, the serenity and calm of the landscape, and the emotional aspect generally.

I have always thought it a great compliment that many clergymen have asked me to allow them to incorporate the "chant" section of the piece into their church services.

3. The following account was given in Radio Times, 4 September 1931, page 203:

In a Monastery Garden was commissioned for performance in a seaside resort. The idea for it came to the composer during a visit to a monastery while out motoring. At first no publisher would take it unless Ketélbey [sic] removed the Kyrie section: but later a publisher bowed to Ketélbey's will, and it became, Kyrie and all, one of the world's "best sellers".

4. Ketèlbey's colleague, Herbert C. Ridout, has the following in Behind the needle, 5: Looking over forty years of the gramophone (in The Gramophone, November 1940, page 132):

It was in October 1915 that we issued a record of a then unknown work called In a Monastery Garden, and I think we must have been animated by the wish to give our friend Albert Ketelbey's piece a good send-off, because the coupling on the record was the more famous Destiny waltz. But there soon came a time when Monastery Garden stood quite well on its own merits, and became such a success that it pointed out a distinct path for its composer to follow. I know Albert Ketelbey would have preferred [sic] to be identified with the more serious music he had composed and published (some of it under the nom-de-plume of Anton Vodorinski) and, but for a purely accidental happening in connection with his Monastery Garden, this might have well been the case. The story really began two years or so earlier and in a recording atmosphere, so it is quite apropos here.

Among the members of the orchestra regularly employed by Ketelbey for recording was a clarinet player called Scoma. In the summer months every year, when orchestral engagements in London were at their lowest ebb, Scoma himself conducted an orchestra of his own in Bridlington during the holiday season. Being great friends with Ketelbey, Scoma asked him if he would write for him an original orchestral work that he could feature as a novelty in his seaside programmes. That was in 1912. After paying a visit to Scoma at Bridlington, Ketelbey conceived the idea of In a Monastery Garden and passed the manuscript to Scoma. The latter soon began to report in excited letters that the little work not only aroused enthusiasm when played, but that he was receiving enquiries as to its publication. Scoma repeated the performances the following season, and this time declared that he had been pestered with requests for it in published form, rather shrewdly, however, advising the composer against publication for the moment, urging patience until it had been thoroughly tried out. He played it yet a third year at Bridlington, but this time news of its reception had traveled to London independently, for Ketelbey was approached by several London publishers anxious to secure it. Eventually J.H. Larway was the publisher chosen - at Ketelbey's own terms!

The lyrics of 1921 in the Indiana State archive are shown as follows; Through the misty twilight falling, Voices from afar are calling – Calling all the weary homeward to their rest, The evening bell is softly pealing, While from out the cloisters stealing, Comes this prayer of mercy, peaceful and so blest.

KYRIE, ELEISON,

Hope will bring to us its gladness, Faith shall take away all sadness, While the gates of day are closing in the West, Joy will come again with morning, Shadows pass, but love is dawning, God is Love and gives us all Eternal Rest.

KYRIE, ELEISON

=== Summary ===
There appear to have been two pre-publication versions. The piano manuscript was with Edgar Larway at Chilworth, while the orchestral parts were with Enrico Scoma at Bridlington. Even after publication, there is one difference of harmony between the two versions that makes them incompatible.

What none of these accounts mentions is that the first appearance of In a Monastery Garden nationwide was as the recording on Regal Records. This appeared in the Regal catalogue for May 1914, the year before the publication of the sheet music. This first recording uses a different orchestration from the published one, and has details closer to the piano version.
