= Rosa Schweninger =

Austrian painter

- Born: 1849; Vienna, Austria
- Died: 1918
- Education: University of Applied Arts Vienna

Rosa Schweninger (1849–1918) was an Austrian painter. She was a member of a Viennese family of artists, which included her father, Carl Schweninger the Elder, and her brother, Carl Schweninger the Younger.

She studied at the University of Applied Arts Vienna with Frederick Sturm from 1869 to 1871. Her work includes portraits and florals.

Schweninger exhibited her work in the rotunda of The Woman's Building at the 1893 World's Columbian Exposition in Chicago, Illinois.

The Zwei Lieder, op. 20, by Viennese composer Bertha von Brukenthal are dedicated to her. Schweninger's portrait of von Brukenthal is held by the Brukenthal National Museum in Sibiu, Romania.

== Gallery ==
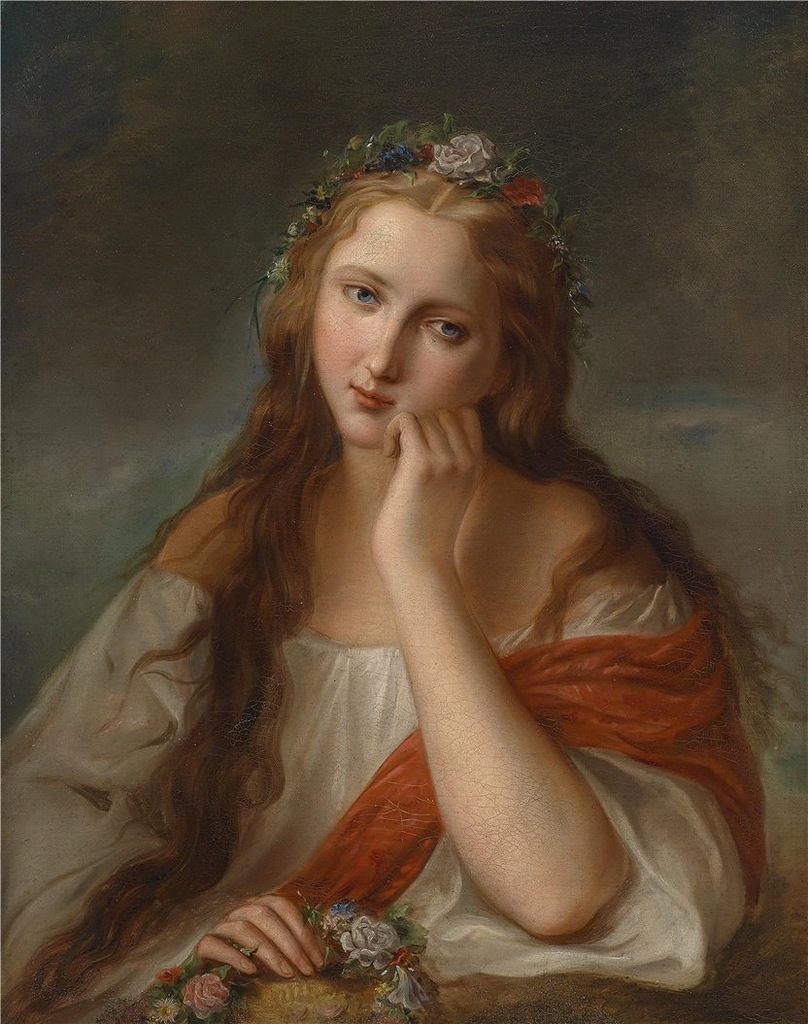
Expectation

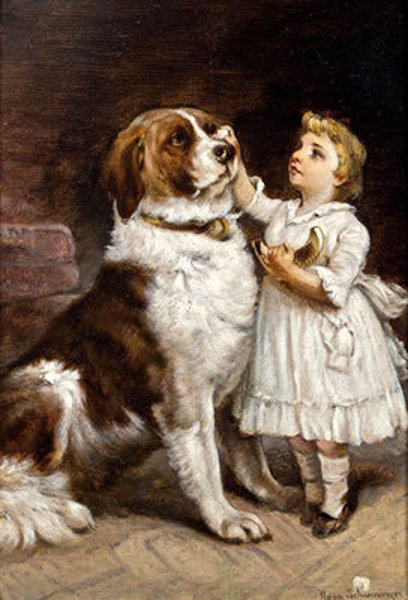
Girl with Saint Bernard

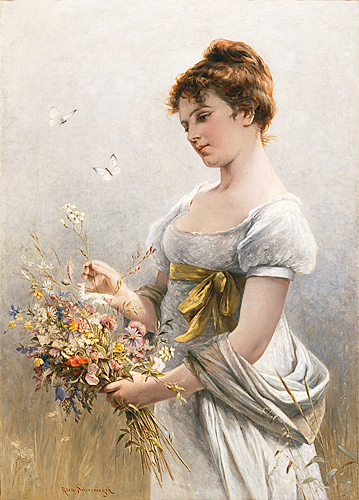
Summer

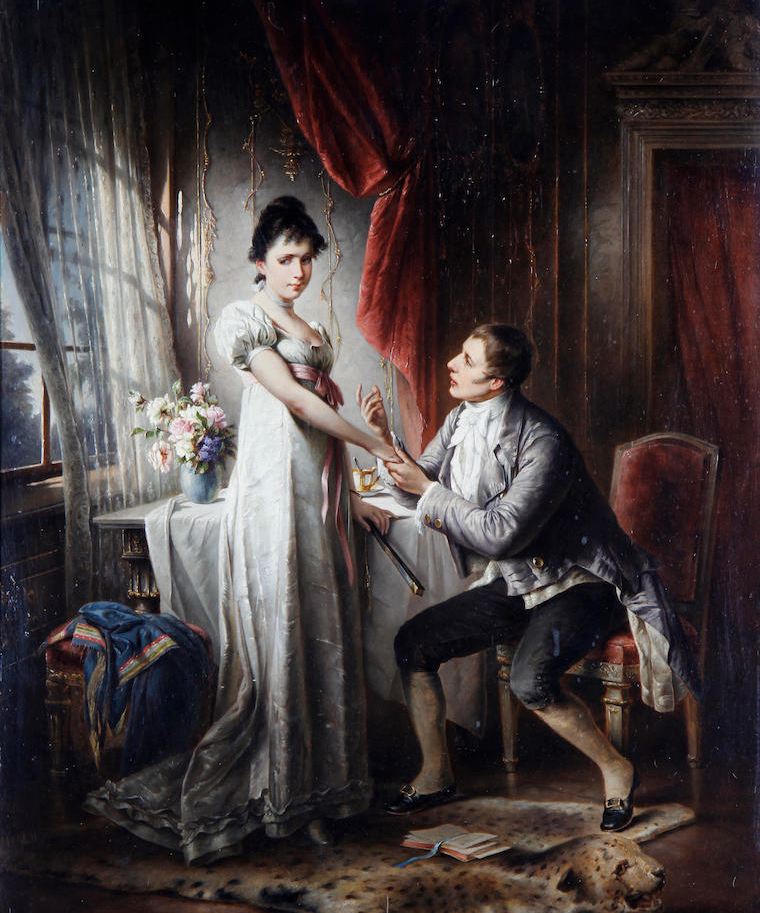
The Apology

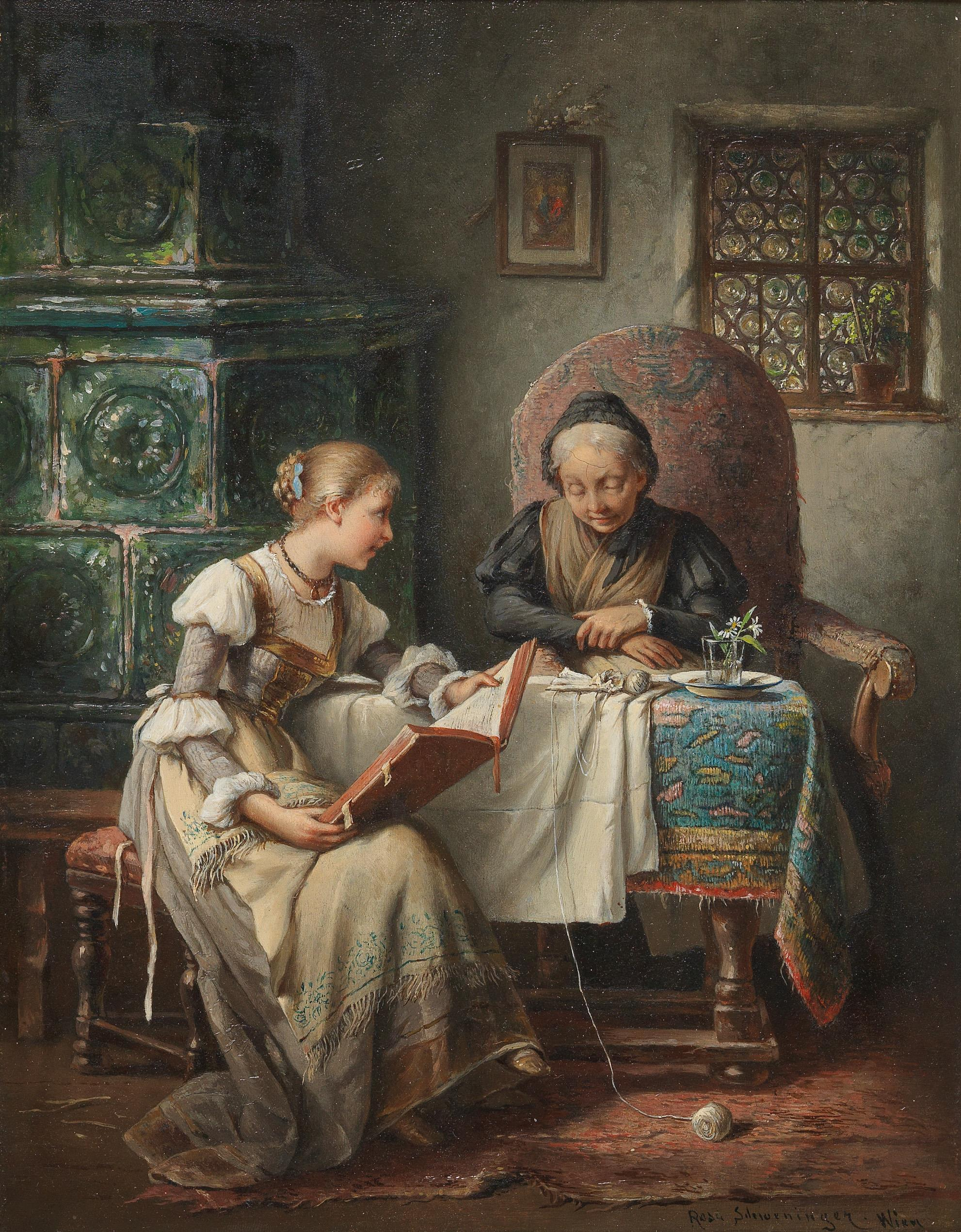
In the Parlour
