= Ronnie Ronalde =

British singer (1923–2015)

- Also known as: "The voice of variety" "The world's greatest whistler"
- Born: Ronald Charles Waldron; 29 June 1923; Islington, London, England
- Died: 13 January 2015 (aged 91) London, England
- Genres: Music hall, variety
- Occupations: Siffleur, singer, yodeller
- Years active: 1938–2015
- Labels: Columbia; Decca Records; EMI; Major Minor; Pye
- Formerly of: Silver Songsters
- Website: Official website

Ronald Charles Waldron (29 June 1923 – 13 January 2015), known professionally as Ronnie Ronalde, was a British music hall singer and siffleur. Ronalde was famous for his voice, whistling, yodelling, imitations of bird song and stage personality. His crystal clear yodelling gained him acceptance with connoisseurs of Alpine and Western music around the world.

== Biography ==
=== Early life: the Silver Songsters ===
Ronalde grew up in a poor but supportive Islington home, and found a talent for singing, whistling and bird impressions from early childhood. In these formative years, he entertained informally for pocket money, or with church and school choirs, developing his talents for stage performance.

During a time in which he was training for accountancy, Ronalde was invited to become one of Arturo Steffani's Silver Songsters, aged 15. This 21-piece boys' choir was known for its complex vocal and visual arrangements of popular songs, with each boy usually going into other trades when older. Steffani was so taken with Ronalde's voice and whistling (he referred to him as "the Pink of Perfection"), that he disbanded the Silver Songsters (in 1947) and became his personal manager, mentor and chaperone. They later toured all over the world together.

After wartime service, Steffani encouraged Ronalde to study singing in London and yodelling in Switzerland, and for nearly a decade he began working his way up the bill, not only as a solo Variety performer, but also under his new name: Ronnie Ronalde.

=== 1950s: the halcyon years ===
After early struggles, Ronalde's first successful UK tour (in the late 1940s) met him with a wave of interest. Ronalde's first recordings were with Decca Records (these were only to be whistling performances), but his first major label contract came from EMI. Ronalde would also join Pye, Major Minor and Columbia records, becoming a million-selling artiste.

"If I Were a Blackbird" (1950) is among Ronalde's most famous songs from this period. This rendering of Delia Murphy's Irish folk song had him in the British top 20 for 6 months. She would later jovially express her thanks for boosting her income. Other songs include "Tritsch Tratsch Polka" (a showcase of Ronalde's high speed delivery whistling) and "Bells Across the Meadow" (by Albert Ketèlbey). His best known recording is "In a Monastery Garden" (by Albert Ketèlbey). Ronalde played it as his show finale for decades, and over a million copies of it have been sold in their varying formats.

Across this decade Ronalde was a headliner, and broke box office records all over the world: he was a big name in the UK, US, Australasia, Scandinavia, Africa, South America and Europe. Such was his success in the US in the 1950s, he was seen as serious competition to Frank Sinatra and Bing Crosby, and others such as Richard Tauber and Josef Locke.

Ronalde had his own BBC Radio show from 1949 called The Voice of Variety. During this series, the volume of Ronalde's fan mail caused a problem for the BBC. The Voice of Variety News fan publication had a print of 55,000 copies twice yearly, and fan clubs during this era existed all across the UK. Thames TV also presented a weekly show titled Meet Ronnie Ronalde.

In 1949 Ronalde filled Radio City Music Hall in New York City (with capacity of over six thousand) every night for ten weeks. He was at that time the most frequent UK artiste to ever perform there (over a thousand times). During the same period he filled a 25,000 capacity venue in Toronto, Canada, for a fortnight. In February 1956, the British music magazine NME reported that Billy Cotton and Ronalde had released versions of "Happy Trails", the theme music to ATV's weekly Roy Rogers series.

Ronalde also performed for Queen Elizabeth II and Prince Philip at the Royal Command Performance at the London Coliseum. A Daily Express reporter commented on the Prince's attempts to demonstrate whistling to the Queen after this performance. He appeared before Prince Philip again.

=== Later life ===
At the height of his popularity Ronalde foresaw a decline in variety performing and took a step away from the limelight. Nonetheless, Ronalde did not abandon the entertainment industry: he maintained an engagement diary and summer seasons into his 80s, as well as TV appearances and radio broadcasts. He settled on the island of Guernsey in the 1960s, being attracted to it after a performance there. He purchased a hotel (St Martin's, which would come to be known as Ronnie Ronalde's Hotel), and met his Austrian wife Rosemarie who would become his business manager following Steffani's death. After bringing up three children, both he and Rosemarie moved to the Isle of Man in the late 1980s, then to Whistler's Lodge in New Zealand in the 1990s, to the Gold Coast, Queensland, Australia, and returned to the UK in the last years of his life. In New Zealand in 1990, Ronalde filled the 2,500-capacity Aotea Theatre, and was invited to stay for another concert. He was also asked to return for repeat performances in both Auckland and Christchurch town halls.

Ronalde was awarded America's North Carolina Louisburg Hall of Fame Award in 1995, their highest acclaim, given only to artists of outstanding international distinction.

His recording "Bird Song at Eventide" was featured in the hit TV series, and subsequent best-selling soundtrack, The Singing Detective in 1986.

His 1998 autobiography entitled Around the World on a Whistle drew extensively on memorabilia, theatre bills, photographs and clippings, and is a document of the published history of variety circuits. He quipped that his next book would have been "an Encyclopaedia of Whistling".

EMI Australia released a CD with the same title Around the World on a Whistle in the 1990s. In testament to the longevity of his popularity, this gained him another Gold Disc and a small upsurge in his career. EMI subsequently released a number of albums of Ronalde's early works that had not been available since their original gramophone releases.

In 2002, he was inducted into the exclusive entertainment charitable fraternity, the Grand Order of Water Rats.

Ronalde appeared in the 2007 Australian feature film Clubland.

Ronalde made an appearance at the Hackney Empire for a charity evening, The Golden Years of Variety, on Sunday 9 September 2012, when he received a standing ovation. His final public appearance was at Beccles Public Hall & Theatre on Sunday 19 May 2013.

He suffered a stroke shortly after his 90th birthday in 2013, and subsequently moved into Brinsworth House, the retired entertainers' home in Twickenham, where he died.

The comedians Bob Hope, Jimmy Edwards, Morecambe and Wise, Bob Monkhouse, Peter Cook, Max Wall and Max Bygraves have all made references to 'Whistling Ronnie' in their routines. Terry-Thomas joked that he was sick of hearing Ronalde's whistling, and attempted impersonations.

On 17 August 2021 a blue plaque commemorating Ronalde was erected by the British Music Hall Society and unveiled by Jim Carter at Ronalde's childhood home in Downham Road, Islington, London.

== Discography ==
- EP Columbia SEGS-24 (Sweden 1956)
- The Whistling Wonder (Omega Records) - AUS #83
- In a Monastery Garden
- Bells Across the Meadow
- The Skater's Waltz
- Dream of Olwen
- Beautiful Dreamer SEG 7678 EP (Holland)

== Bibliography ==
- Ronalde, Ronnie (1998). Around The World on a Whistle. Blackbird. ISBN 0-473-05692-5.
