= Gouverneur Wesleyan Seminary =

Gouverneur Wesleyan Seminary was an American school located in Gouverneur, St. Lawrence County, New York The seminary was operated in the 19th century by the Black River Conference of the Methodist Episcopal Church.

== History ==
The seminary began in 1827 as a grammar school called Gouverneur Union Academy. On April 5, 1828, this academy was incorporated as The Gouverneur High School. By April 1834, a two story brick school was built and reopened with Mr. Joseph Hopkins as principal. In March, 1836, the management of the school was transferred to the Black River Conference of the Methodist Episcopal Church and the Rev. Jesse Truesdell Peck, D.D. was appointed as principal. On the night of January 1, 1839, the building and all of its contents were burned. The school was relocated to a new location near the present intersection of Main Street and Grove Street, and a stone building was erected at a cost of $5,500. On April 25, 1840, the name of the institution was changed by act of Legislature to "Gouverneur Wesleyan Seminary".

By 1869, the buildings and facilities had become inadequate to their needs and the seminary was relocated to the campus of the Antwerp Liberal Literary Institute in Antwerp, New York.

== Antwerp Liberal Literary Institute ==
The Antwerp Liberal Literary Institute first received a provisional charter in 1856. This location provided a large three story stone building that had been dedicated on May 9, 1861. The value of buildings, grounds, library, and apparatus at that time was $13,000. By 1872, a four story stone ladies’ boarding hall was constructed at a cost $16,000. On April 21, 1874, the name was changed to Ives Seminary after a benefactor, Willard Ives of Watertown, New York. Alumni include businessman and Wisconsin State Senator John Harris. The Ives Seminary continued in existence until at least 1891 or later.

== Principals ==
Rev. Joseph Hopkins 1830-37; Rev. Jesse Truesdell Peck, D.D.1837-40; Rev. Loren L. Knox, D.D. 1840-42; Rev. Anson W. Cummings, A.M., D.D., LL. D. 1842-44; Rev. John W. Armstrong, D.D. 1844-50; Rev. William W. Clark 1850-52; Rev. E. C. Bruce 1853-60; Rev. Andrew Roe 1861-63; Rev. George G. Dains 1864-69; Rev. E. C. Bruce 1869-71; Mr. Moses H. Fitts 1871- ; Prof. S. M. Coon 1871-72; Prof. J. T. Gordon 1872-73; Rev. George G. Dains 1873-75; Rev. M. A. Veeder 1875- ; Rev. Ward W. Hunt 1877-80; Martin R. Sackett 1891.

== Alumni ==
- Helen Morton Barker (1834-1910), social reformer
- Newton Martin Curtis (1835 – 1910), Union officer during the American Civil War and a member of the United States House of Representatives from New York.
- Serranus Clinton Hastings, U.S. Congressman and founder of the Hastings College of the Law at University of California
- Clara Cleghorn Hoffman (1831-1908), educator and temperance activist
- Thomas Bramwell Welch (1825–1903), inventor of a preservation process for unfermented grape juice, founder of Welch's Grape Juice Company
- Gilead J. Wilmot, Wisconsin State Senator
