= Royal Wasson Sorensen =

- Education: University of Colorado
- Awards: AIEE Fellow
- Scientific career
- Workplaces: California Institute of Technology
- Doctoral students: Vincent C. Rideout, Simon Ramo, Gilbert McCann

Royal Wasson Sorensen (April 25, 1882 – October 27, 1965) was the inventor of the vacuum switch, professor of electrical engineering and head of the electrical engineering department at California Institute of Technology, and was also noted for his work in high voltage transmissions and air pollution. Sorensen was also a fellow and president of American Institute of Electrical Engineers and Eminent Member of Eta Kappa Nu.
