= Carl Schweninger the Younger =

Austrian painter

Carl Schweninger the Younger (17 May 1854 – 27 December 1912) was an Austrian painter.

== Life ==
Carl Schweninger was born in Vienna, Austria and came from a Viennese artist family. He was the son of the painter Carl Schweninger the Elder and brother of the painter Rosa Schweninger. He learned painting first from his father, then he studied from 1871 to 1873 with Karl Mayer at the general painting school of the Academy of Fine Arts Vienna. After completing his studies, he went on a trip to Germany, where he also continued his studies at the Academy of Fine Arts, Munich.

In 1883, he exhibited his work The Pocket Player at the International Art Exhibition in the Munich Glass Palace.

Carl Schweninger mainly painted Rococo genre scenes. Many of his pictures have been published in magazines such as Die Gartenlaube, Ueber Land und Meer, and Moderne Kunst. He also crafted sculptures.

Schweninger created illustrations for the poetry of German poets, such as Ferdinand Freiligrath's O lieb 'as long as you can love and Joseph Victor von Scheffel's Der Trompeter von Säckingen.

== Gallery ==
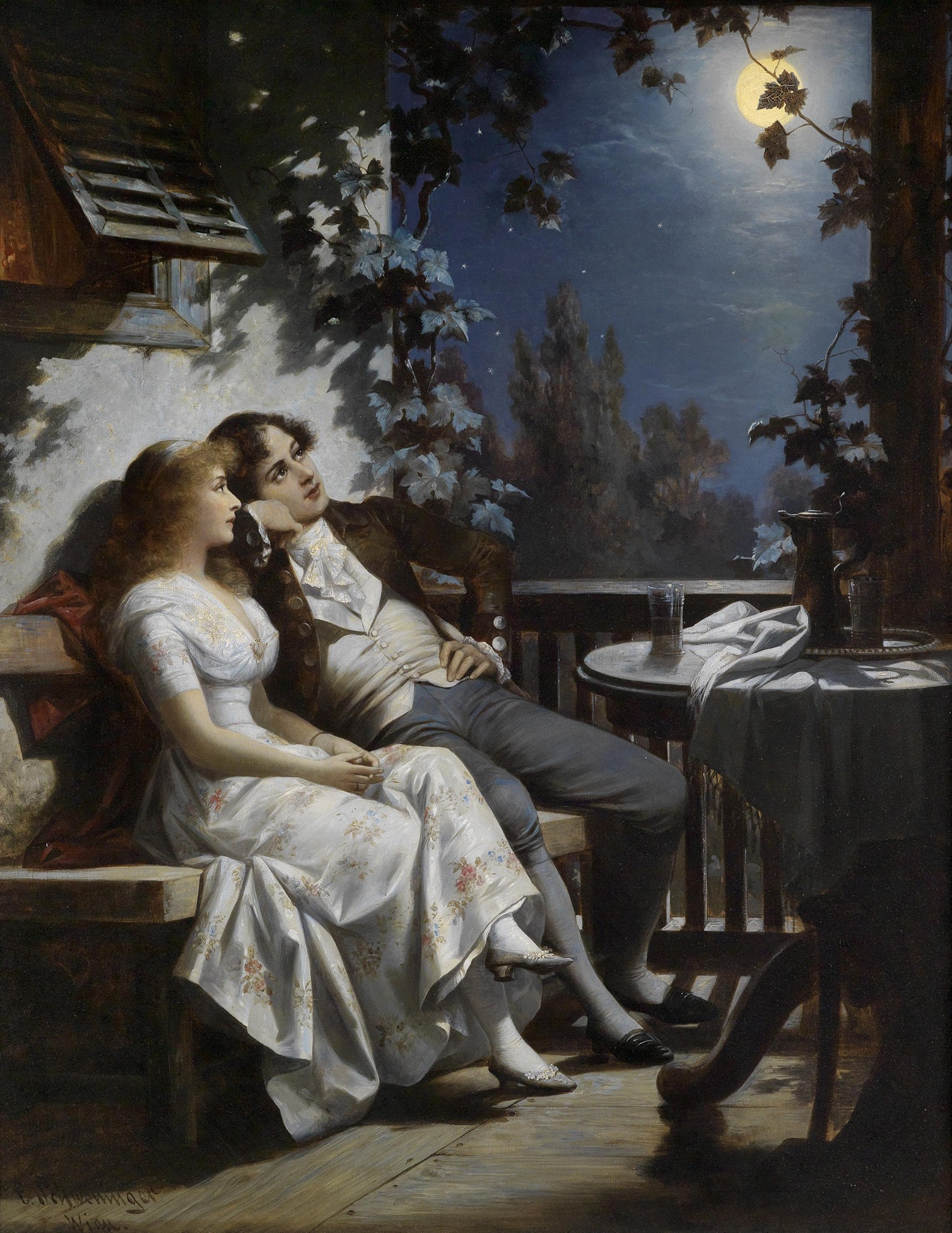
Couple in Moonshine

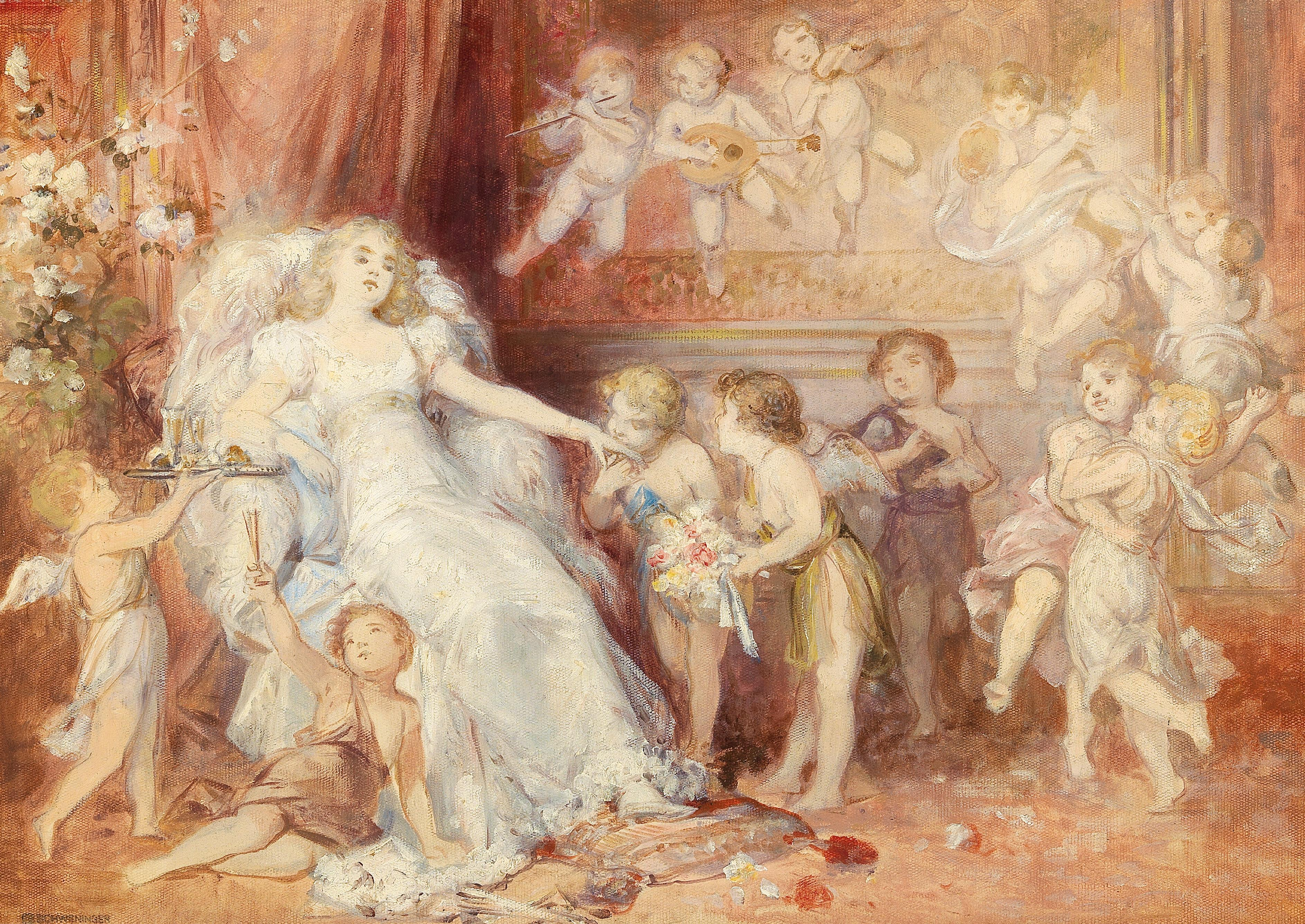
Surrounded by Angels

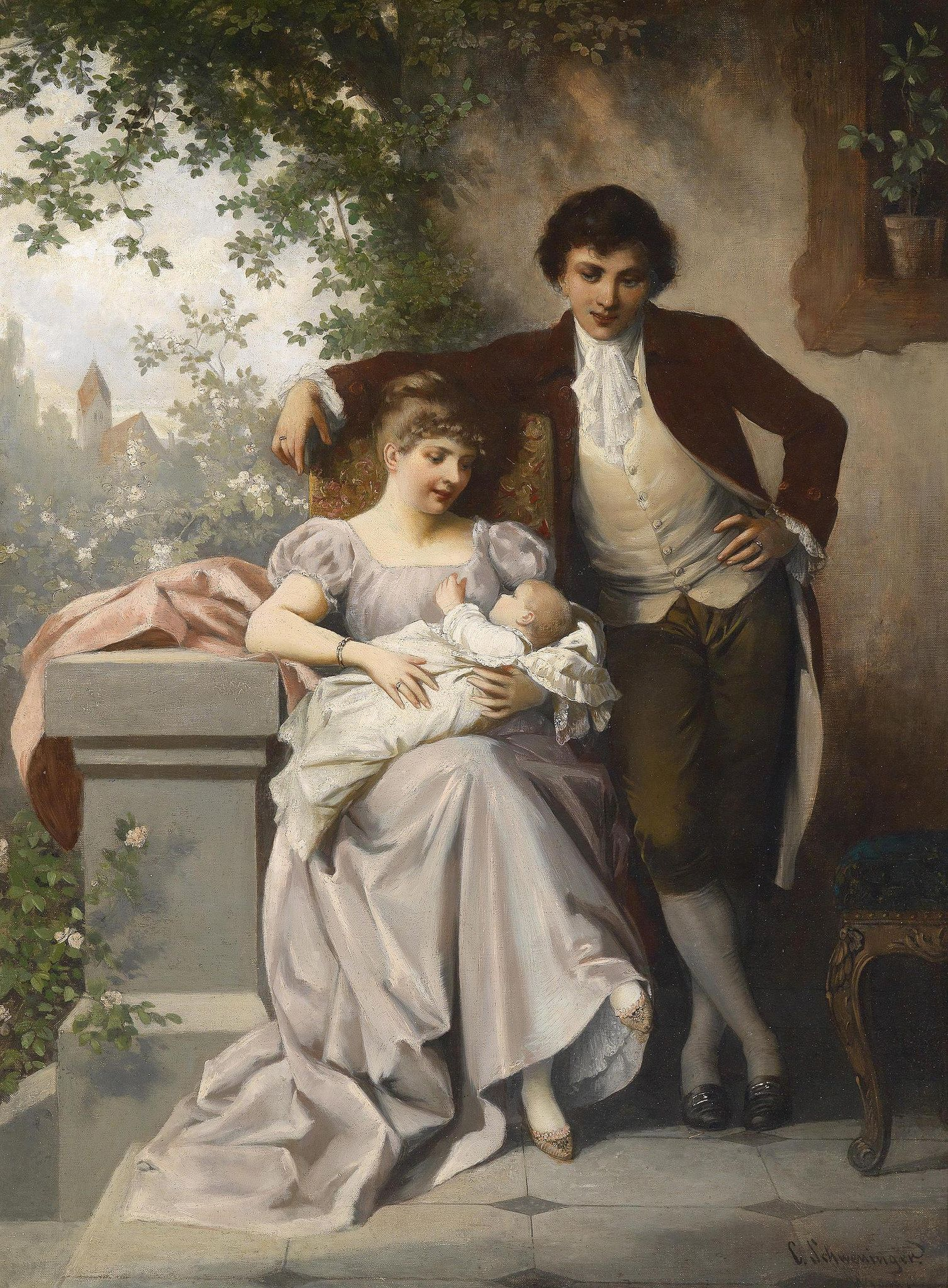
Mother's Happiness

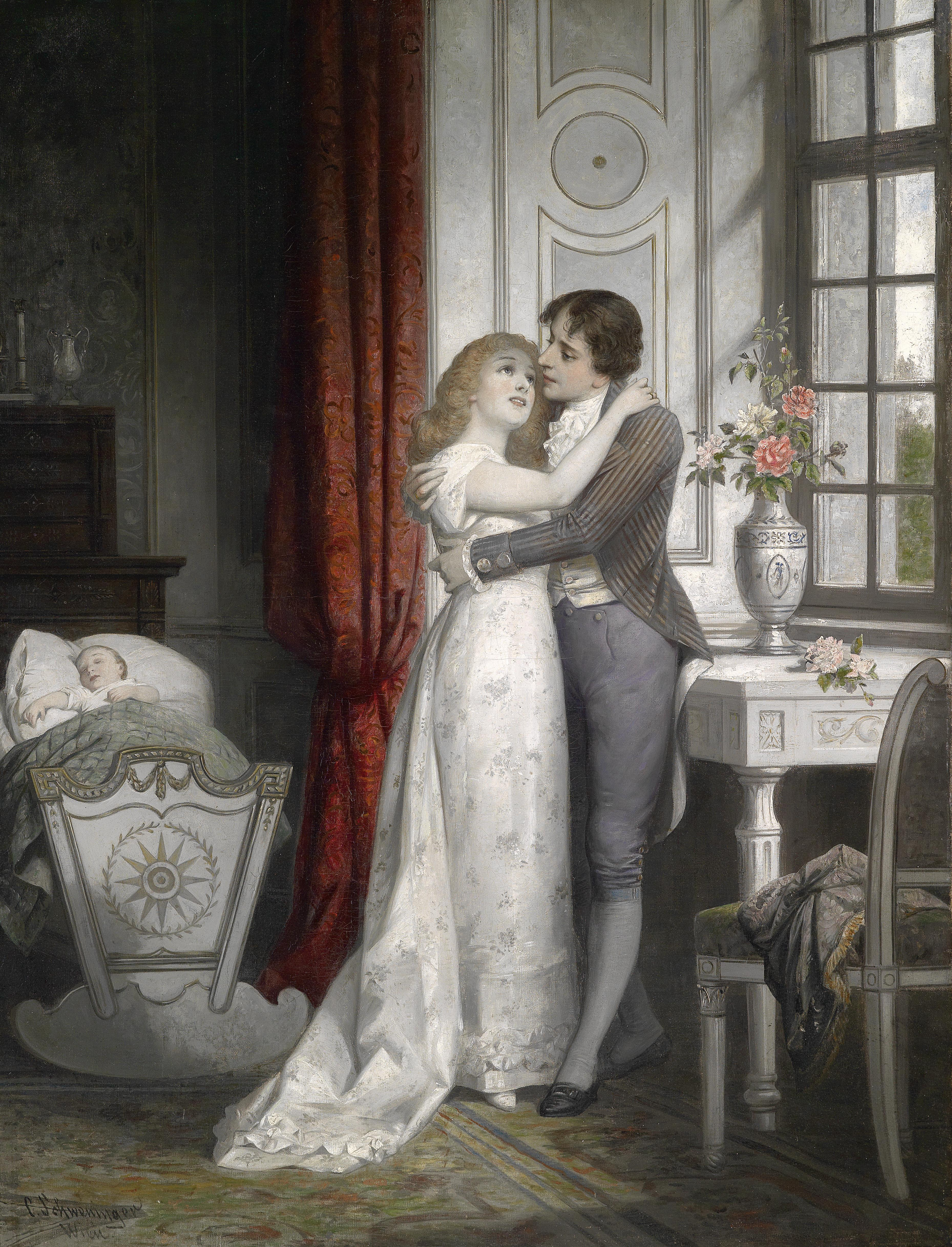
Happy Family

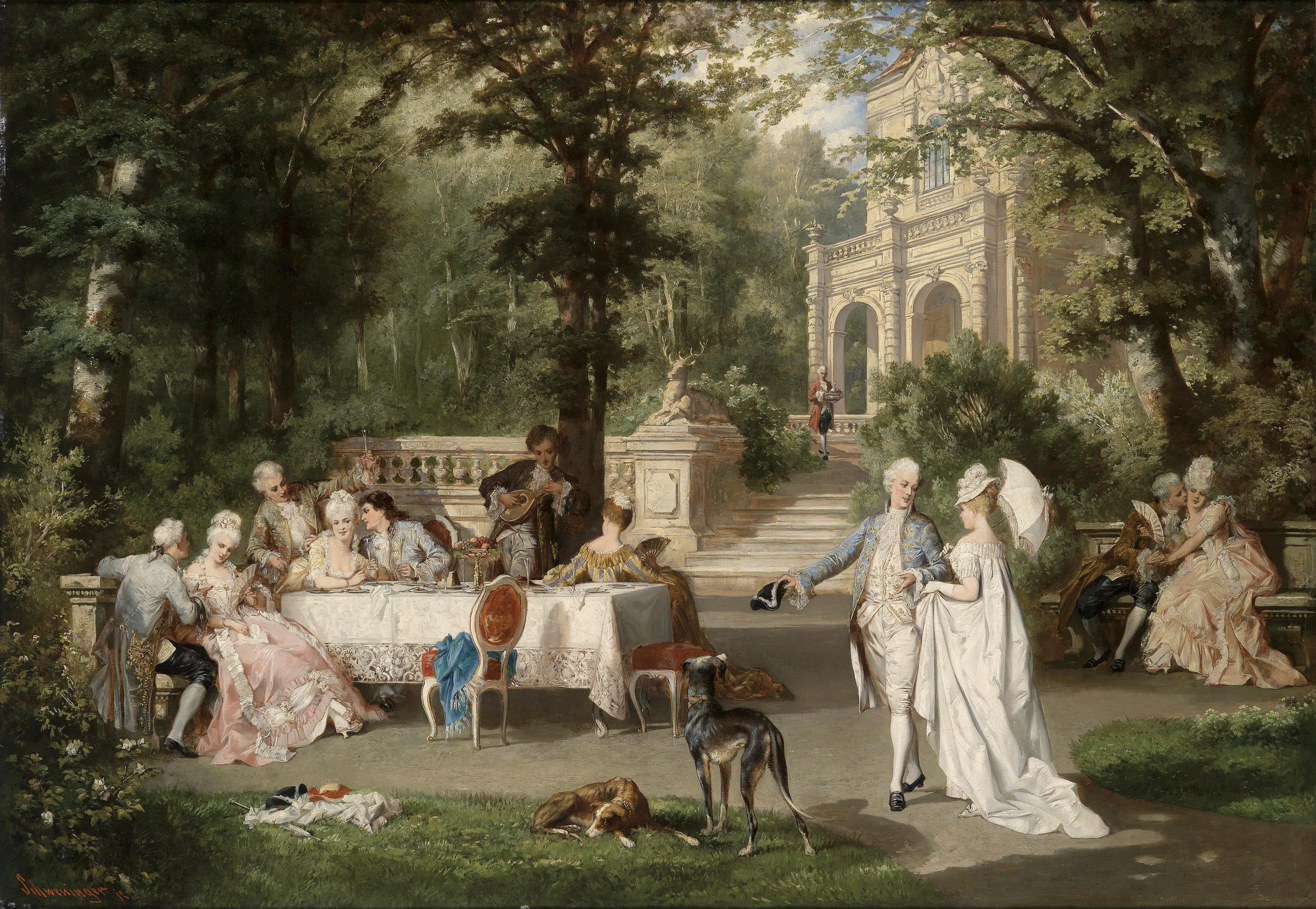
Gallant Company in the Castle Park

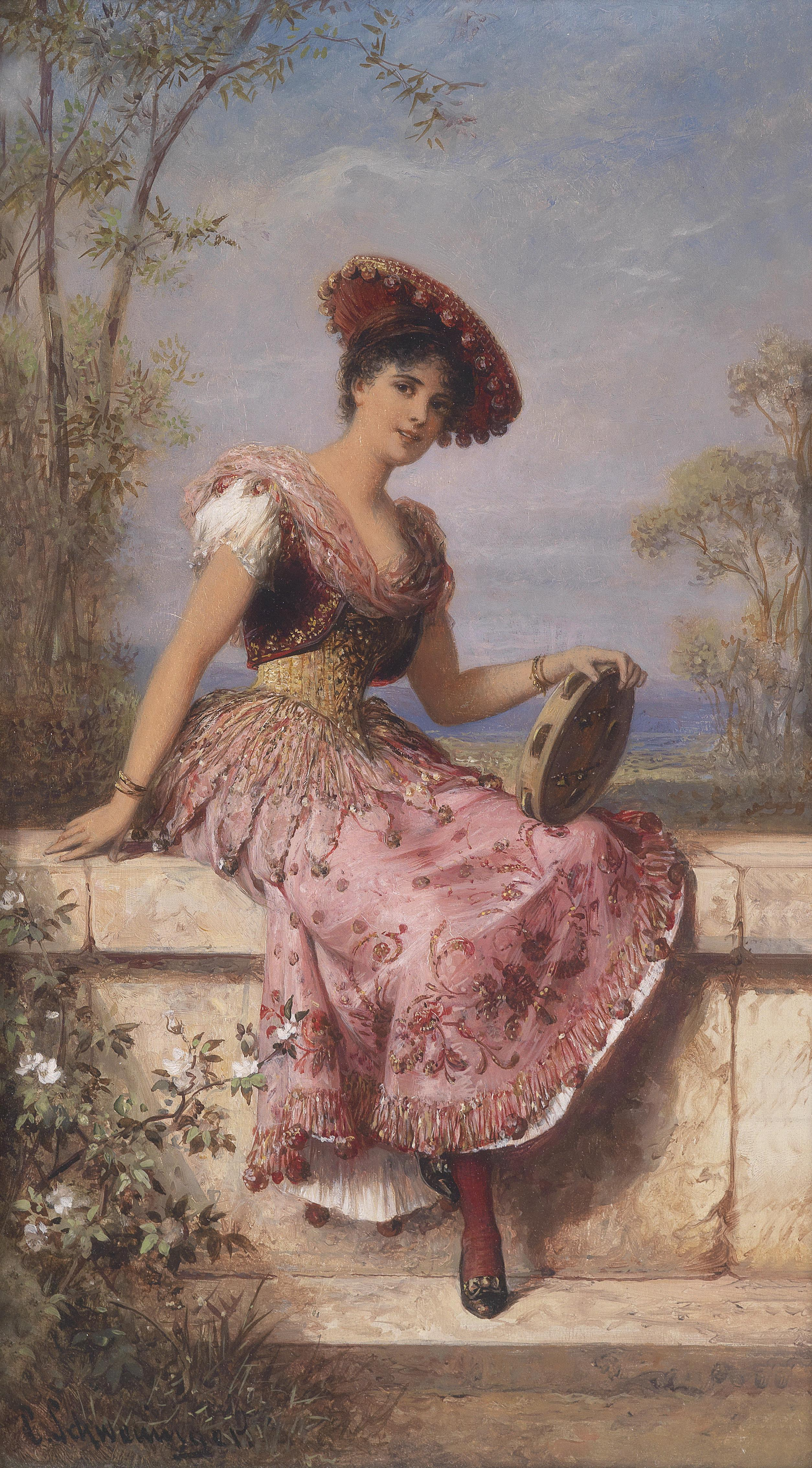
Young Tambourine-player

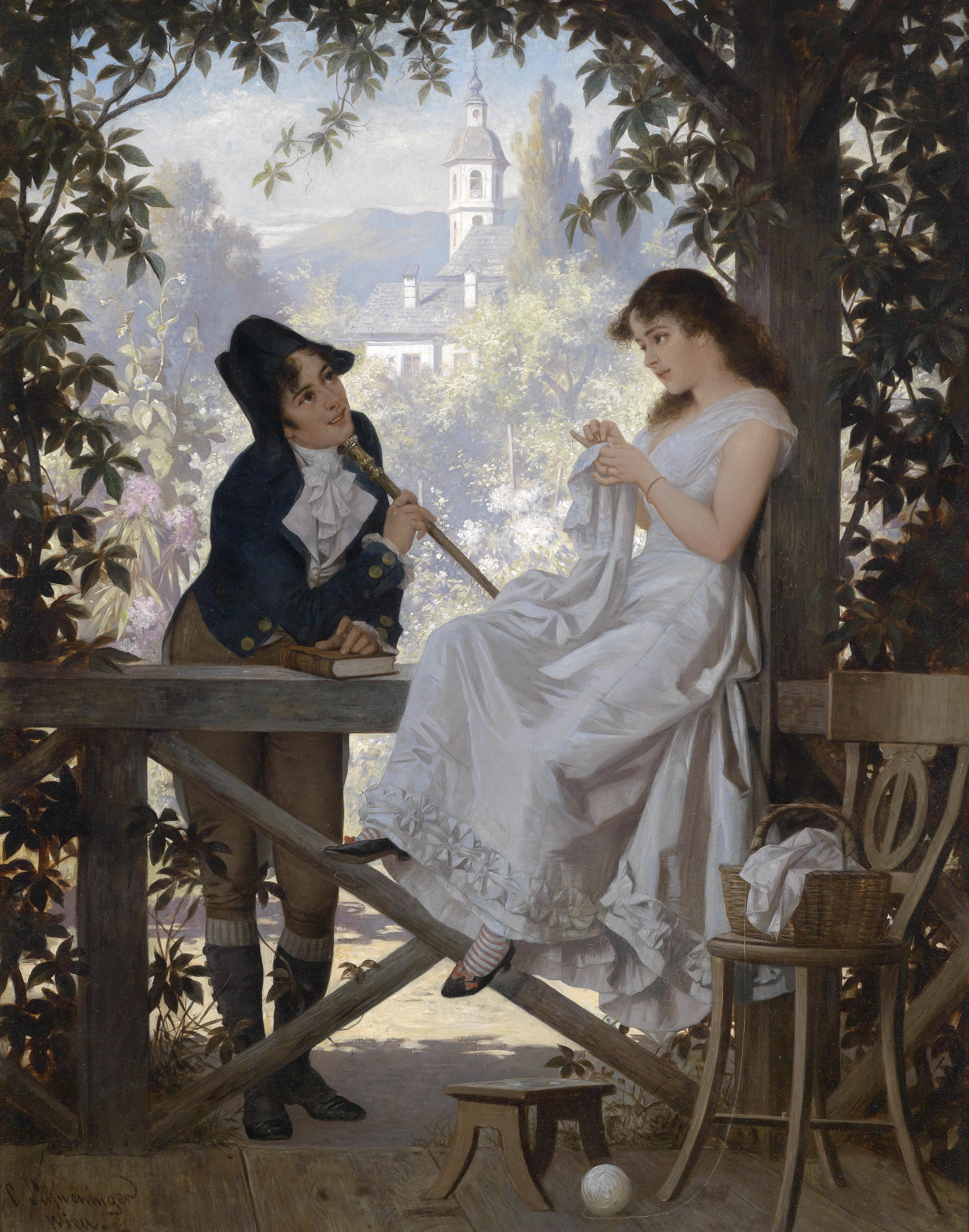
The Rendezvous

== Literature ==
- In: Hans Vollmer (Hrsg.): Founded by Ulrich Thieme and Felix Becker . vol 30 : Scheffel – Siemerding . EA Seemann, Leipzig 1936, p. 380.
- H. Grimm: Schweninger, Carl d. J. (1854-1912). In: Austrian Biographical Lexicon 1815–1950 (ÖBL). Volume 12, Verlag der Österreichischen Akademie der Wissenschaften, Vienna 2005, ISBN 3-7001-3580-7 , p. 48.
