= Helen Morton Barker =

American temperance activist (1834–1910)

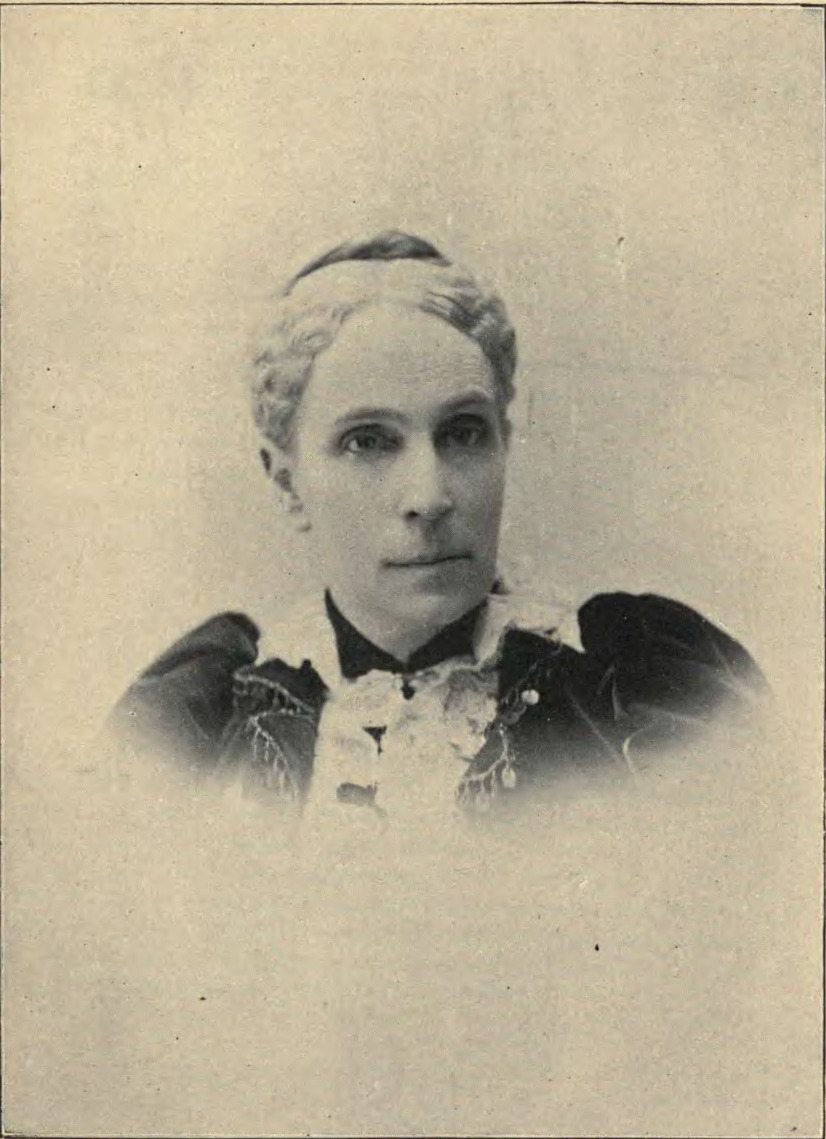
- Born: Helen M. Morton; December 7, 1834; Richville, New York, U.S.
- Died: May 6, 1910 (aged 75); Hinsdale, Illinois, U.S.
- Education: Gouverneur Wesleyan Seminary
- Occupation: social reformer
- Organization: Woman's Christian Temperance Union
- Known for: temperance activism
- Spouse: Moses Barker (m. 1858)

Helen Morton Barker (née, Morton; December 7, 1834 – May 6, 1910) was an American social reformer active in the temperance movement. For twelve years, she served as treasurer of the National Woman's Christian Temperance Union (WCTU).

== Early life and education ==
Helen M. Morton was born at Richville, New York, December 7, 1834. (Note: According to Leonard & Marquis (1908), Barker was born December 8, 1834.) She was of New England parentage. Her father, Elijah Morton (1802–1885), was a physician and scientist; her mother, Eunice Sophia (Brown) Morton (1813–1897), was a teacher. Both were radical temperance reformers. Helen had three younger sisters: Louise, Matilda, and Alice.

She was a graduate of the Gouverneur Wesleyan Seminary in Gouverneur, New York.

== Career ==
For five years, Barker taught and served as principal in the public schools of Oswego, New York.

After marriage, she entered into church work, and was for eight years secretary of Foreign Mission work in western New York. It was in this field that her marked ability for platform speaking first manifest itself.

"It is not often given to one woman to be as wise in the cabinet as she is invincible on the field, and as true and tender at heart as she is witty and eloquent of tongue, but Mrs. Barker fills the bill in all these particulars." -Frances Willard

Accustomed from early childhood to assist, by singing and otherwise, in temperance meetings, she joined the WCTU upon its first introduction into her community. In 1877, she was unanimously elected first president of the Allegany County, New York organization, and devoted herself with such zeal to it that it was speedily known as the best organized county throughout the state, and Barker was made State Organizer.

Removing northwestward, she was elected president of the Dakota WCTU in 1884, when the vast spaces were included in Dakota Territory. She served in this role for eight years, and during that time, organized hundreds of unions and visited nearly every town in that territory.

In 1889, when The Dakotas were organized as States and brought into the Union, Barker was elected president of the South Dakota WCTU.

In 1892, she was appointed one of the two Board of Lady Managers representing South Dakota, for the World's Columbian Exposition at Chicago. Barker's business ability so impressed itself upon her colleagues that she was called to president Bertha Palmer's office as assistant and remained there for two years. She also served as superintendent of the Board of Lady Managers' industrial department.

At the Chicago WCTU Convention, in 1893, she was made National WCTU Treasurer. Her financial showing at the Cleveland WCTU Convention proved the choice to have been an inspired one, and she was re-elected with enthusiasm. She held the position for 12 years, until failing health compelled her retirement.

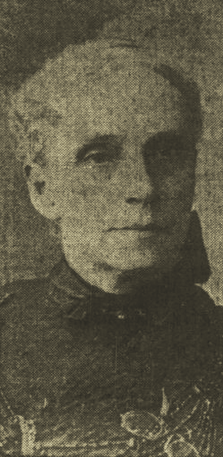
Barker's photo in her Chicago Tribune obituary

== Personal life ==
On October 7, 1858, she married Rev. Moses Barker (1829–1911). They had four children: Minnie, Morton, Lottie, and Manley.

In her later years, Barker resided in Evanston, Illinois.

Taken ill with the grip, Barker was removed to the Hinsdale Sanitarium, Hinsdale, Illinois, where she died a week later, on May 6, 1910.
