= Women's Building =

The Women's Building or Woman's Building may refer to:

Denmark

- The Women's Building (Copenhagen), a self-owning institution in Copenhagen, Denmark

United States

- Woman's Building (Charleston, South Carolina), a part of the South Carolina Inter-State and West Indian Exposition, 1902
- The Woman's Building (Chicago), a part of the World's Columbian Exposition, 1892
- Woman's Building (Los Angeles), a non-profit arts and education center located in Los Angeles, California
- The Women's Building (San Francisco), a women-led non-profit arts and education community center located in San Francisco, California
