= John Harris (Wisconsin politician) =

American politician and businessman

John H. Harris (August 29, 1856 – July 24, 1933) was an American politician and businessman.

Born in Antwerp, New York, Harris went to Ives Seminary in Antwerp. In 1897, Harris moved to Clinton Junction, Wisconsin and then to Spring Prairie, Wisconsin; he finally settled in Elkhorn, Wisconsin. In 1890, Harris started the Wisconsin Butter and Cheese Company in Waukesha, Wisconsin. Harris served on the Elkhorn Town Board from 1896 to 1898 and was a Republican. Then, from 1899 to 1903, Harris served in the Wisconsin State Senate. Harris then served as president of the First National Bank in Elkhorn, Wisconsin. Harris died in Elkhorn, Wisconsin.
