= Vincent C. Rideout =

Canadian–American academic

- Born: 22 May 1914; Chinook
- Died: 28 July 2003 (aged 89)
- Alma mater: California Institute of Technology; University of Alberta
- Academic career
- Institutions: University of Wisconsin–Madison (1946–1983); Bell Labs (1940–1946)
- Academic advisor: Royal Wasson Sorensen (M.Sc.)
- Doctoral students: Gerald Estrin, Vaidyeswaran Rajaraman, Fred Charles Schweppe

Vincent Charles Rideout (May 22, 1914 – July 28 2003) was a Canadian-American computer engineer, and professor emeritus at the University of Wisconsin-Madison.

== Early life and education ==
Rideout was born in Chinook, Alberta in 1914. He attended Calgary Normal School, and in 1938 earned a B.Sc. in Engineering Physics from the University of Alberta, and a M.Sc. in Electrical Engineering from the California Institute of Technology in 1940.

== Industry work ==
During World War II, Rideout researched microwave radar and relay systems at Bell Labs. In 1951, he also worked as a visiting research engineer at Boeing. Later, he also did consulting work for Allis-Chalmers, Cutler-Hammer and IBM.

== Academic work ==
Rideout joined the University of Wisconsin faculty in 1946 as an assistant professor of the Department of Electrical Engineering. He was later instrumental in renaming the department to Department of Electrical and Computer Engineering. There, he was the major professor for 30 Ph.D. students, including Gerald Estrin and Vaidyeswaran Rajaraman, in spite of not having a doctorate degree himself.

At UW, he authored or coauthored more than 70 technical papers. In 1954, he published a widely adopted electrical engineering textbook called "Active Networks".

Between 1954 and 1955, he lived in Bangalore, India, where he helped build India's first analog computer at the Indian Institute of Technology.

In 1964, at the age of 50, he began studying medicine, which led to work in the field of biomedical engineering. This resulted in his 1991 book "Mathematical and Computer Modeling of Physiological Systems".
