= Leon Rideout =

Leon Rideout may refer to:

- Leon Rideout (American politician)
- Leon Rideout (Canadian politician)
