= Thomas Ridout =

Thomas Ridout may refer to:

- Thomas Ridout (architect) (1828–1905), Canadian architect and railway engineer
- Thomas Ridout (politician) (1754–1829), Canadian politician
- Thomas Gibbs Ridout (1792–1861), Canadian banker
