= Sophia Hayden =

American architect

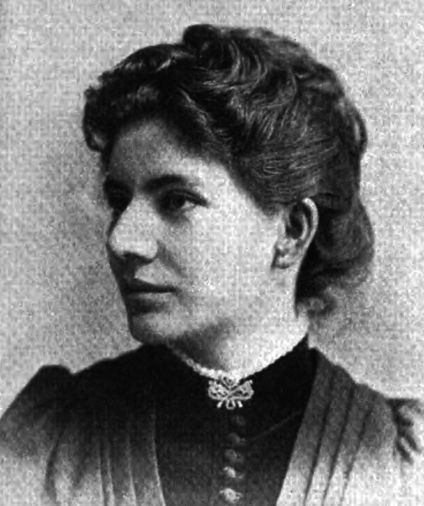
- Sophia G Hayden, Architect of the Woman's Building at the 1893 World's Columbian Exposition in Chicago
- Born: Sophia Gregoria Hayden; October 17, 1868; Santiago, Chile
- Died: February 3, 1953 (aged 84); Winthrop, Massachusetts, United States
- Education: MIT
- Known for: Woman's Building at the World's Columbian Exposition in 1892
- Scientific career
- Fields: Architecture

Sophia Hayden (October 17, 1868 – February 3, 1953) was an American architect and first female graduate of the four-year program in architecture at Massachusetts Institute of Technology.

== Life ==
=== Early life ===
Sophia Gregoria Hayden was born in Santiago, Chile. Her mother, Elezena Fernandez, was from Chile, and her father, George Henry Hayden, was an American dentist from Boston. Hayden had a sister and two brothers. When she was six, she was sent to Jamaica Plain, a neighborhood of Boston, to live with her paternal grandparents, George and Sophia Hayden, and attended the Hillside School. While attending West Roxbury High School (1883–1886) she found an interest in architecture. After graduation Hayden's family moved to Richmond, Virginia, but she returned to Boston for college. She graduated from MIT in 1890 with a degree in architecture, with honours.

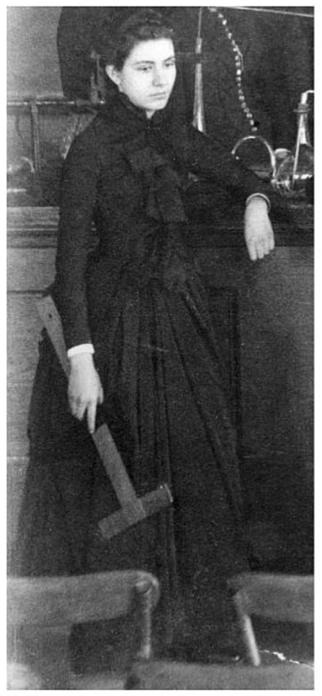
A photograph of Sophia Hayden taken in 1888 when she was an architecture student at Massachusetts Institute of Technology

=== Education ===
Hayden shared a drafting room with Lois Lilley Howe, a fellow female architect at Massachusetts Institute of Technology (MIT). Hayden's work was influenced by MIT professor Eugène Létang.

After completing her studies Hayden may have had a hard time finding an entry-level apprentice position as an architect because she was a woman so she accepted a position as a mechanical drawing teacher at the Eliot School of Fine and Applied Arts in Jamaica Plain.

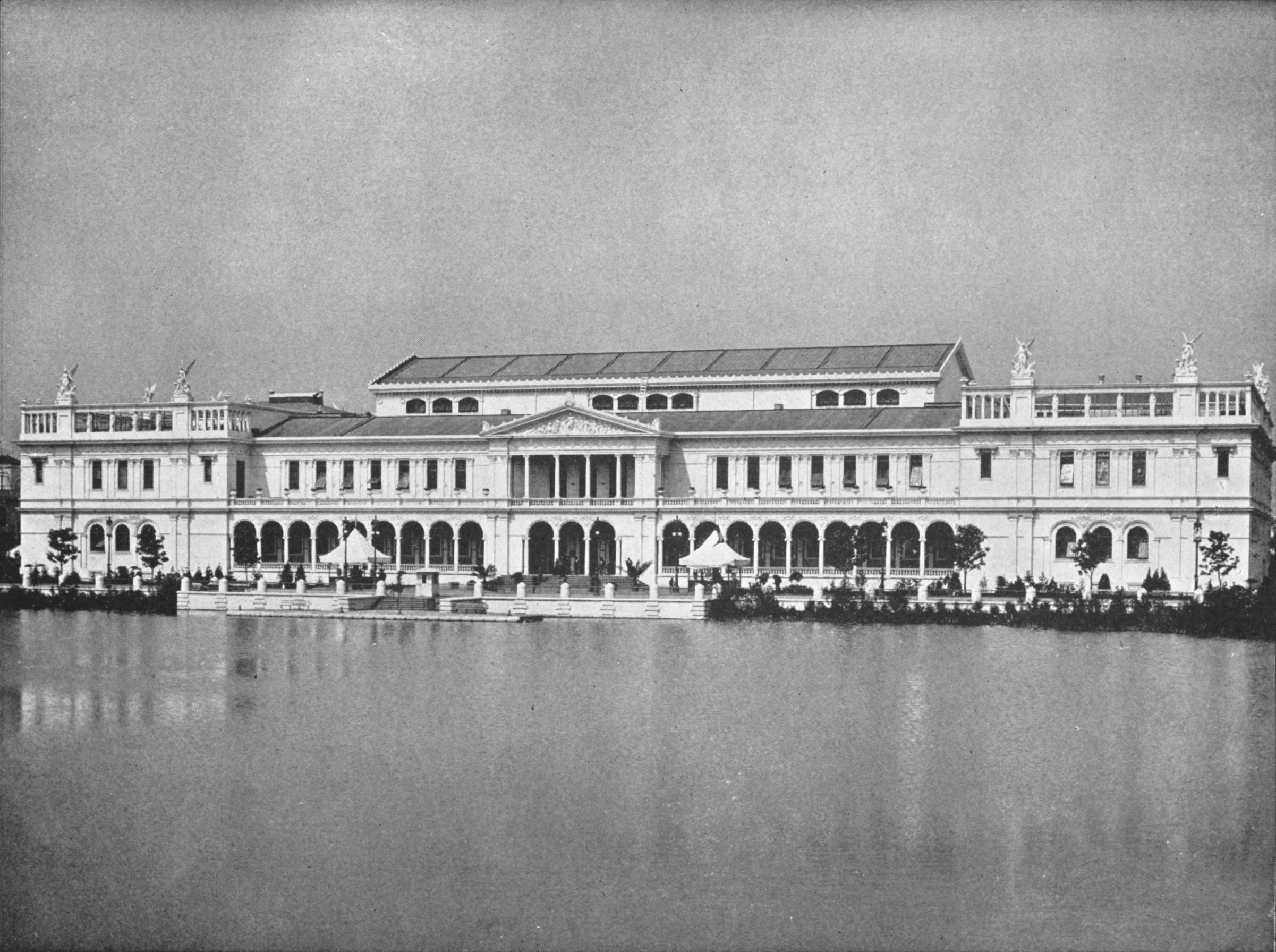
Woman's Building. World's Columbian Exposition (1892 : Chicago, Ill.).

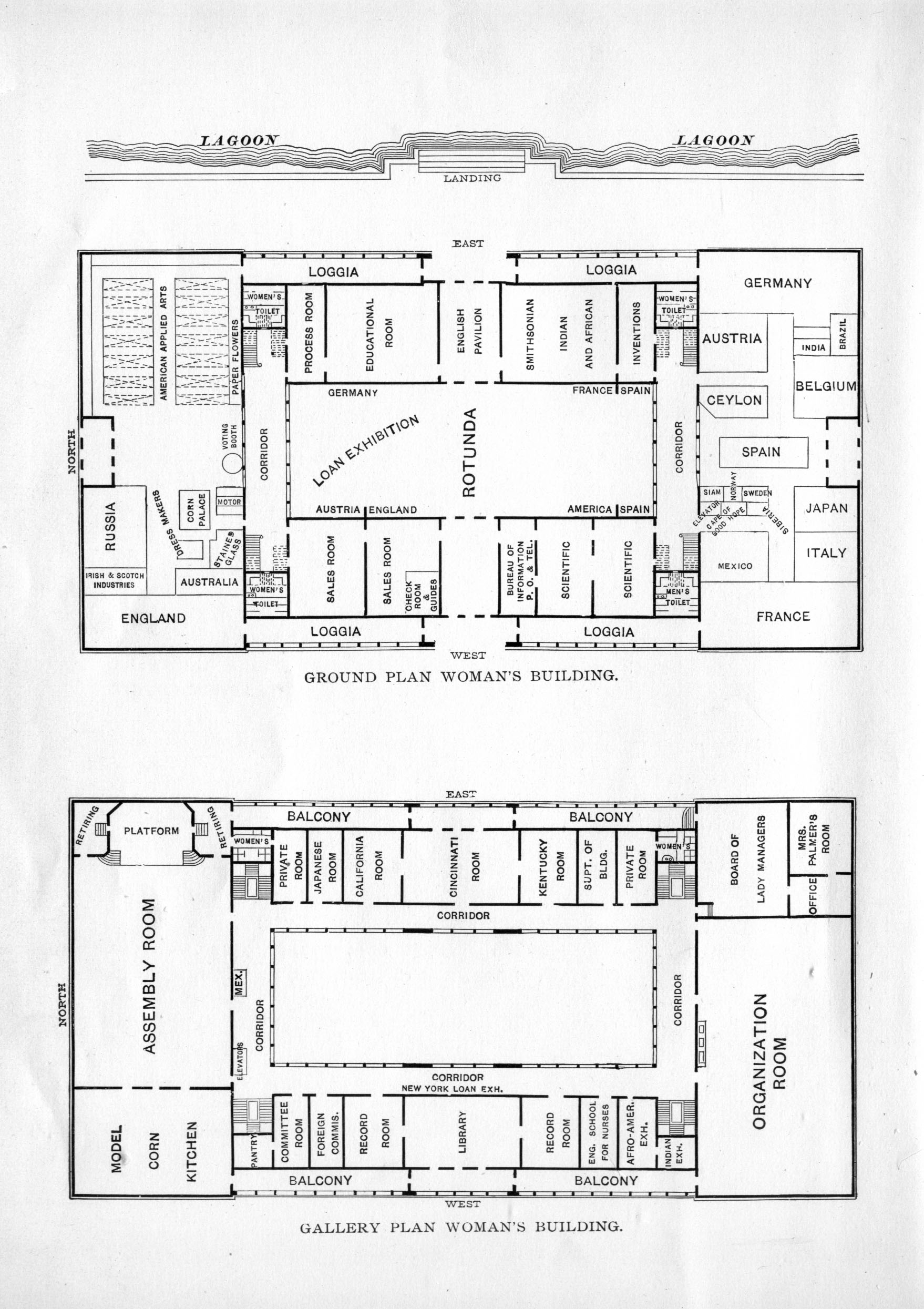
Ground Plan and Gallery Plan of the Woman's Building

=== Career ===
==== World's Columbian Exposition ====
She is best known for designing The Woman's Building at the World's Columbian Exposition in 1893, when she was just 21. The Woman's Building was the nation's most prominent design competition for women at that time. Hayden based her design on her thesis project, "Renaissance Museum of Fine Arts," a grand two-story structure with center and end pavilions, multiple arches, columned terraces and other classical features, reflecting her Beaux-Art training. It became a controversial structure as many women objected to having their work in a separate structure.

Hayden's entry won first prize out of a field of thirteen entries submitted by trained female architects. She received $1,000 for the design, when some male architects earned $10,000 for similar buildings.

During construction, Hayden's design principles were compromised by incessant changes demanded by the construction committee, spearheaded by socialite Bertha Palmer, who eventually fired Hayden from the project. Hayden appeared at the inaugural celebration and had published accounts of support by her fellow architects.

Her frustration eventually was pointed to as typifying women's unfitness for supervising construction, although many architects sympathized with her position and defended her. In the end the rifts were made up, perhaps, and Hayden's building received an award for "Delicacy of style, artistic taste, and geniality and elegance of the interior." Within a year or two, virtually all the Fair buildings were destroyed. Frustrated with the way she had been treated, Hayden may or may not have decided to retire from architecture, but she did not work again as an architect.

==== Retirement ====
In 1900, Hayden married a portrait painter and, later, interior designer, William Blackstone Bennett, in Winthrop, Massachusetts. A stepdaughter, Jennie "Minnie" May Bennett, was from William Blackstone Bennett's prior marriage. The couple had no children. William died of pneumonia on April 11, 1909.

Although Hayden designed a memorial for women's clubs in the U.S. in 1894, it was never built. She worked as an artist for years and lived a quiet life in Winthrop, Massachusetts. Hayden died at the Winthrop Convalescent Nursing Home in 1953 of pneumonia after suffering a stroke.

== In popular culture ==
- Hayden is mentioned in Erik Larson's 2003 novel The Devil in the White City.
- Hayden is played by Katherine Cunningham in the eleventh episode of the first season of the TV series Timeless (2017), although she didn't stay at H.H. Holmes' hotel.

== Works or publications ==
- "Abstract of Thesis: Sophia G. Hayden, 1890." Technology Architectural Review 3 (September 31, 1890): 28,30.
- "The Woman's Building." In Rand McNally and Company's A Week at the Fair, 180. Chicago: Rand McNally, 1893.

== See also ==
- Women architects
- Women in architecture
