= The Woman's Building (Chicago) =

Building at the World's Fair held in Chicago in 1893

Coordinates: 41°47′13.6″N 87°35′8.2″W

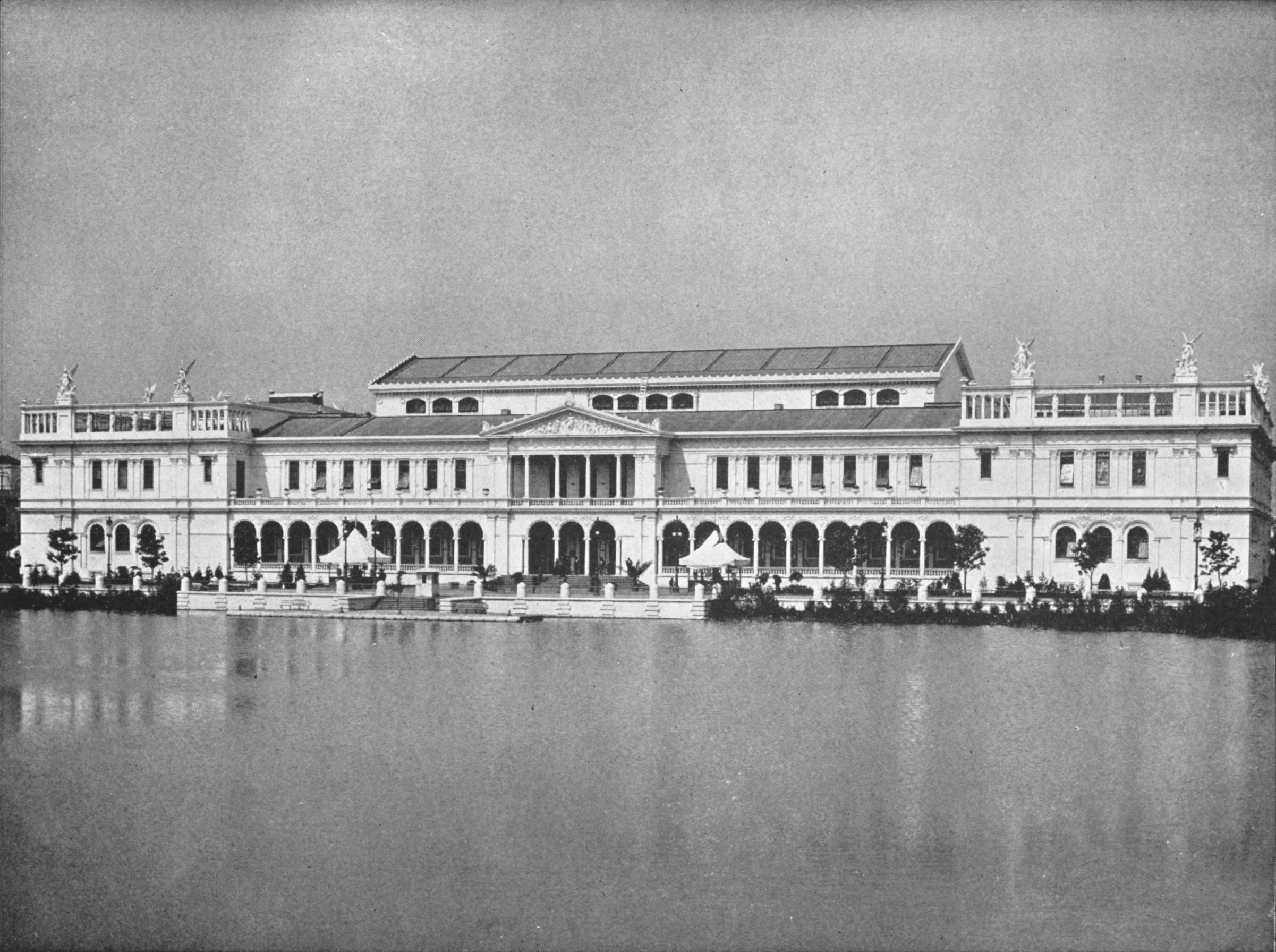
Woman's Building at the World's Columbian Exposition Chicago 1893

The Woman's Building was designed and built in June 1892, for the World's Columbian Exposition held in Chicago, Illinois, United States in 1893; under the auspices of the Board of Lady Managers. Out of the twelve main buildings for the Exhibition, the Woman's Building was the first to be completed. It had an exhibition space as well as an assembly room, a library, and a Hall of Honor. The History of the World's Fair states, "It will be a long time before such an aggregation of woman's work, as may now be seen in the Woman's Building, can be gathered from all parts of the world again." The purpose of the building was to highlight woman's achievements, and challenge the traditional ways of thinking at the time it was built. The Woman's Building was planned, designed, and decorated entirely by women under the direction of the board of lady managers. The building was demolished after the Fair.

== Building ==
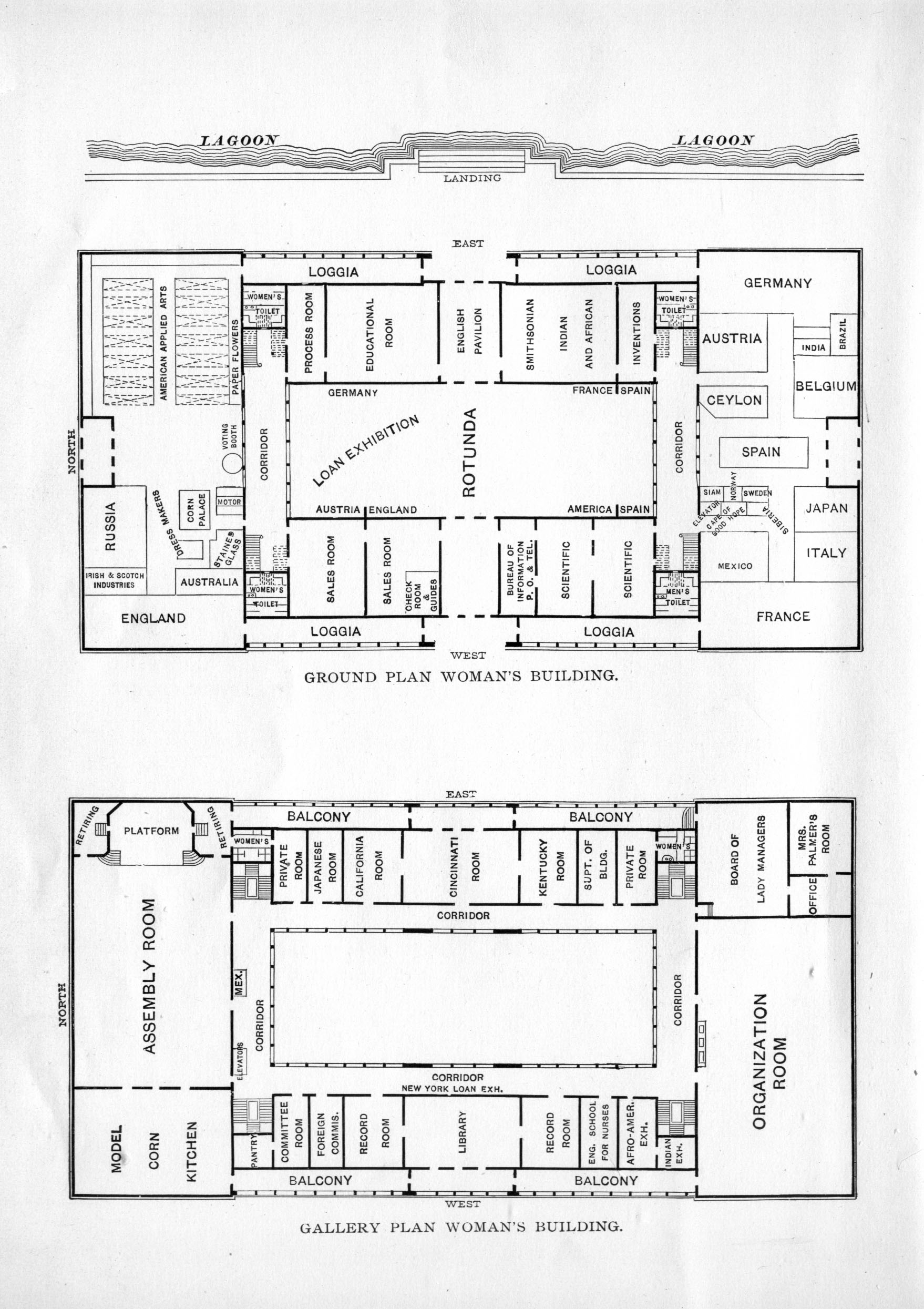
Floor Plan and Ground Plan of the Woman's Building, World's Columbian Exposition, 1893

Throughout the construction process of the Women's Building, fourteen women architects submitted designs. The board of architects selected Sophia Hayden's design of an Italian Renaissance-style three-story building with Corinthian columns. The hall honor was 70 ft in height with no additional pillars that would obstruct the view. Alice Rideout was chosen as the official sculptor for the Woman's Building. She created the exterior sculpture groups and the pediment. Enid Yandell designed and created the caryatid that supported the roof garden. In addition, Candace Wheeler supervised the interior decorations.

== Decor ==
Interior decoration included murals painted by Mary Fairchild MacMonnies Low (Primitive Woman) and Mary Cassatt (Modern Woman). Cassatt was asked to paint a 58-foot × 12-foot mural for the north tympanum over the entrance to the Gallery of Honor, showcasing the advancement of women throughout history, called Modern Woman. Four panels in the Hall of Honor were painted by Lucia Fairchild Fuller, Amanda Brewster Sewell, Rosina Emmet Sherwood and Lydia Field Emmet. The work by Rosina Emmet Sherwood, titled The Republic's Welcome to Her Daughters, is a neo-classical setting with women draped in a toga bestowing women entering the hall with laurels as crowns. Women in Arcadia, painted by Amanda Brewster Sewell, displays a warm summer with two women, one of which is half nude holding their hand out to a sheep and the other stands behind her plucking oranges from a tree. The library ceiling mural was painted by Dora Wheeler Keith. Regardless of the artists background, they all painted their murals in the 'new style' which had been developed in France.

The British sculptor Ellen Mary Rope contributed a bas-relief, depicting ‘Hope, Charity, Faith and Heavenly Wisdom’, which found a later home in the dining room of the first Ladies' Residential Chambers in London, a project of cousins Rhoda and Agnes Garrett.

Located in the Assembly Hall were seven stained and leaded glass windows that were visible from both the inside as well as out, the most prominent of which was centered behind the stage. These were created by Elisabeth Parsons, Edith Blake Brown, and Ethel Isadore Brown, Massachusetts Mothering the Coming Woman of Liberty, Progress, and Light depicts two women both in classical garb, the one in the forefront holds a torch high above her head.

== Exhibits ==
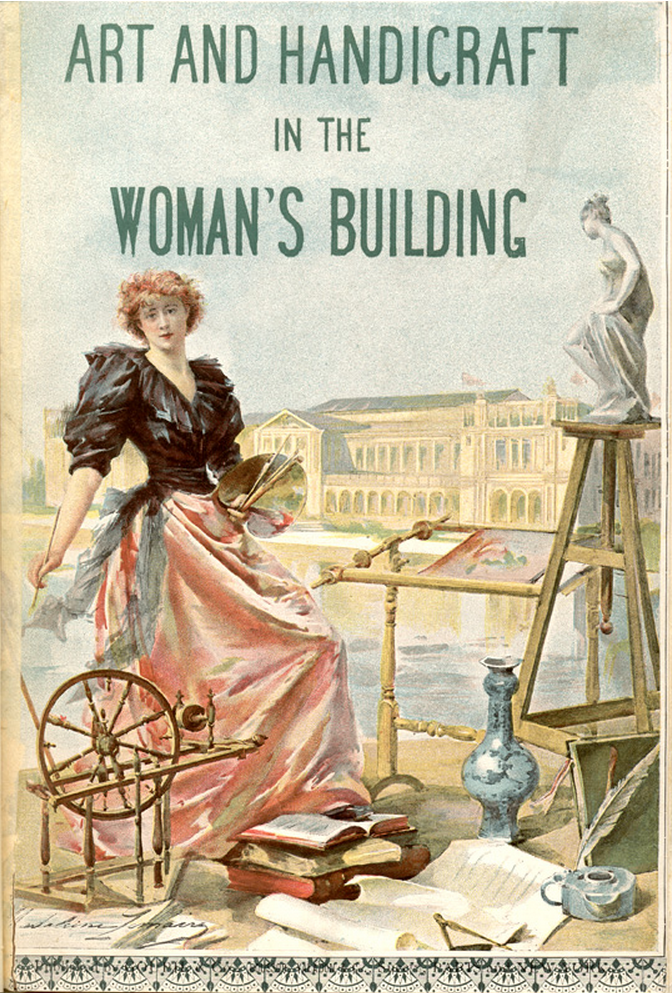
Madeleine Lemaire's poster for The Art & Handicraft in the Woman's Building

The Woman's Building contained exhibits of works by women across a variety of fields from fine art, applied art, literature and music, to science, and home economics. There were also exhibits about women in American history and other cultures and places in the world. Displays also included charts and graphs of women's advancement in the industrial workforce as well as philanthropic and political work. The Smithsonian loaned an ethnological exhibit featuring crafts from several cultures including African, Native American, and Polynesian, titled "Woman's Work in Savagery". The Inventions Room and Science Exhibit featured more modern contributions, all of which except for one were of white woman.

The library, located on the second floor and decorated with wood paneled bookshelves, leather couches, and artworks by female artists, boasted at least 8,000 books representing 24 different nations all of which were written by women. Annexed to the Woman's Building was the Children's Building, which exhibited American 19th century best practices for child-rearing and education.

== Reactions ==
The Woman's Pavilion at the 1876 Centennial Exposition in Philadelphia fought to raise money and protect land ownership at the fair. The resilience and persistence surprised male management members as they did not expect the women to be able to raise enough money for a separate building, which they did. This laid some groundwork so that by 1893 there was lesser backlash from the World Columbian Exposition management members. This allowed for the authorization of the creation of the Board of Lady Managers.

The Board of Lady Managers worked tirelessly to connect their individual enterprise with the entirety of the rest of the fair. They insisted on fair representation of female judges across exhibitions and equitable recognition of women's enterprise in all competitions.

Although most women viewed this building as a chance to celebrate progress in women’s achievements, there was still some backlash. Some argued that having a separate building to show off strictly work done by women, it singles women out and suggests they are secondary to men. Along with protesters saying that the building suggested women were secondary to men, another major backlash they faced had to do with the actual architecture of the building. Some argued that the building was too plain and not as bold compared to the other buildings that were designed by men. Going along with these criticisms, people said that the design was too feminine and delicate.

== Legacy ==
Enid Yandell and Laura Hayes co-wrote a semi-autobiographical account of three women architects and their involvement in planning the fair. Along with Yandell and Hayes, eight illustrators are credited with contributing to illustrations throughout the book. Jean Loughborough, Laura Hayes, and Enid Yandell lived together before the 1893 Chicago World's Fair and contributed to the construction of the Women's Building. This novel was written and published in 1892 and titled Three Girls in a Flat (1892).

The exhibits at the Woman's Building inspired Danish noblewoman, Sophie Oxholm, to organize a women's exhibition in Copenhagen, eventually resulting in the 1895 Copenhagen Women's Exhibition.

Buildings at world's fairs are often demolished when the event ends, and finding another home for them is rarely practical. (The exception was The Crystal Palace after the Great Exhibition of 1851.) The Woman's Building was destroyed as part of the general demolition after the Fair. Sadly, after the exposition, Cassatt's mural and many other artworks by many women were placed in storage and subsequently lost.

Eighty years later, the Woman's Building had been almost lost to history. With the flourishing of second-wave feminism, women went searching for what had gone before. Feminist artist Judy Chicago and her team of students, in the midst of creating The Dinner Party, discovered a copy of the Woman's Building catalog in a second-hand bookstore. When the Los Angeles Woman's Building was opened in 1973, the founders decided to name the organization after the 1893 Woman's Building.

== Gallery ==
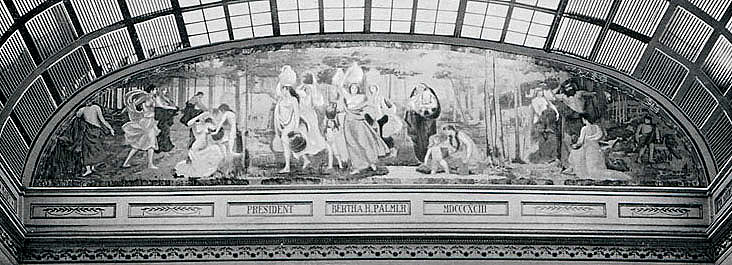
Mary Fairchild MacMonnies - Primitive Woman - Decoration for the Woman's Building at the World's Columbian Exposition 1893

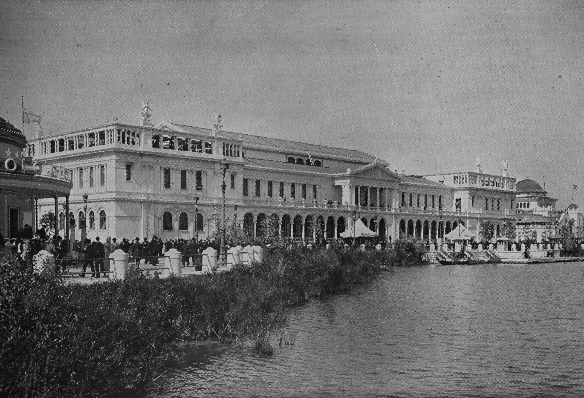
The Woman's Building, World's Columbian Exposition, 1893

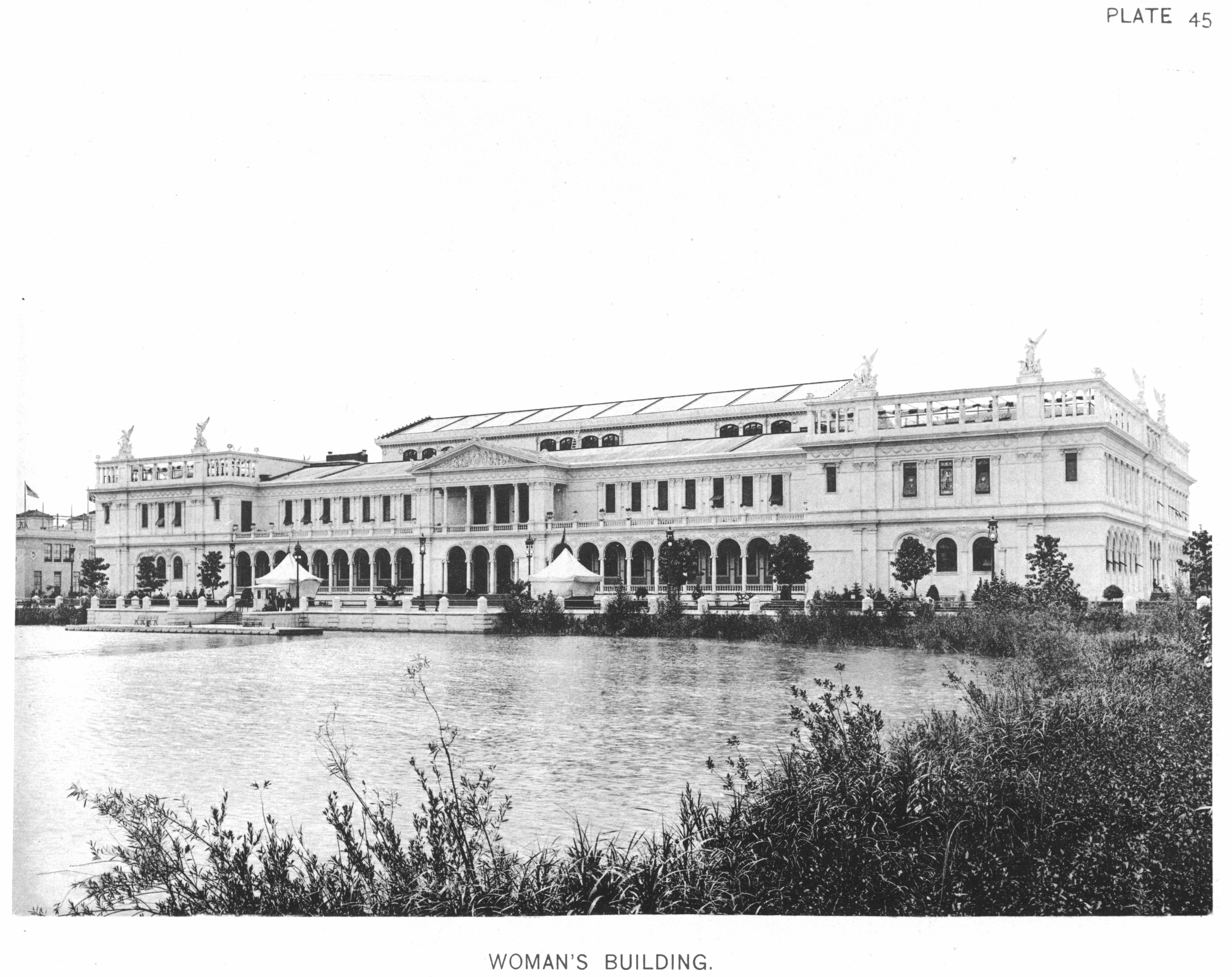
Woman'S Building — Official Views Of The World's Columbian Exposition — 45

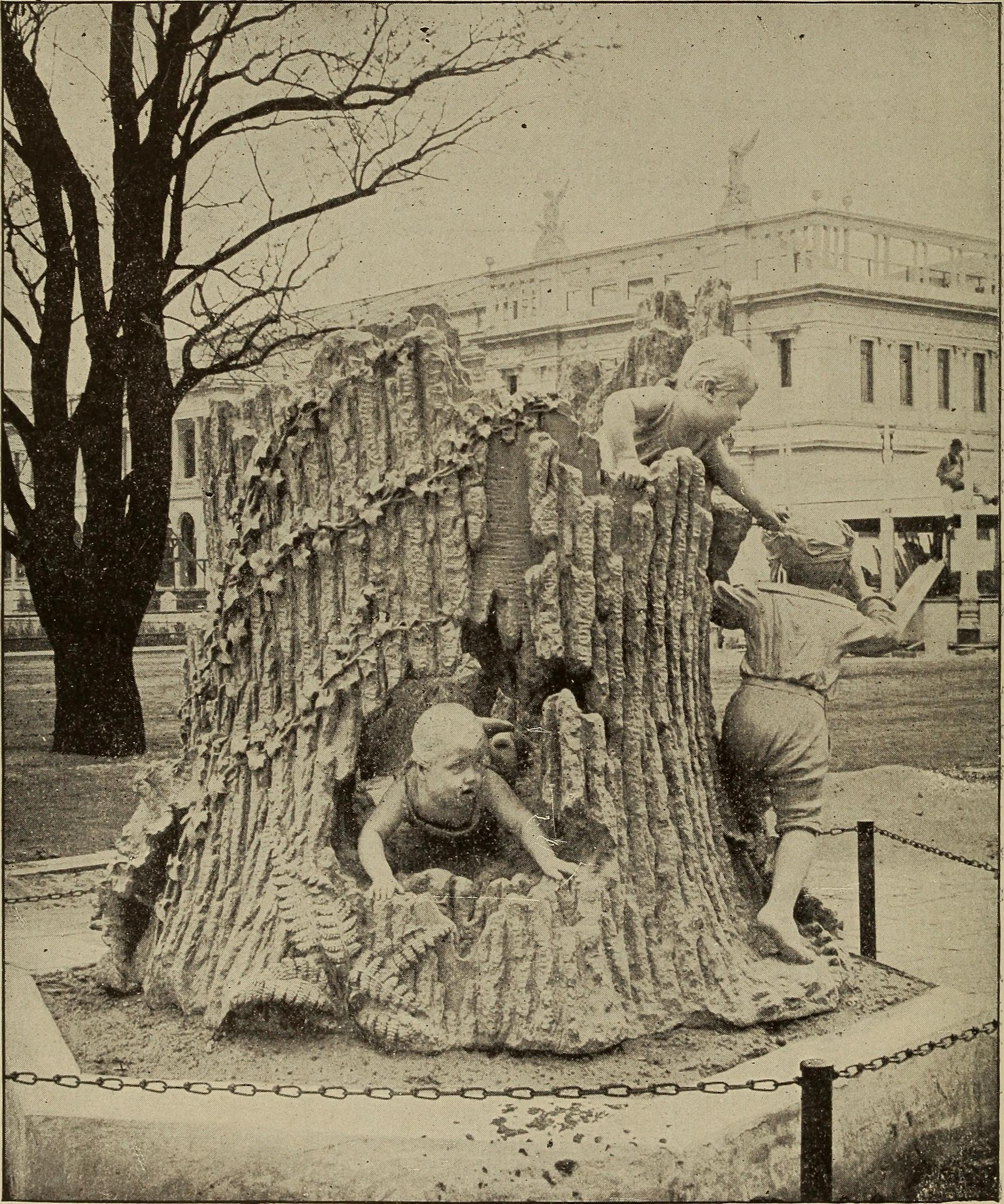
Hide and Seek. Sculptural Group in front of the Woman's Building

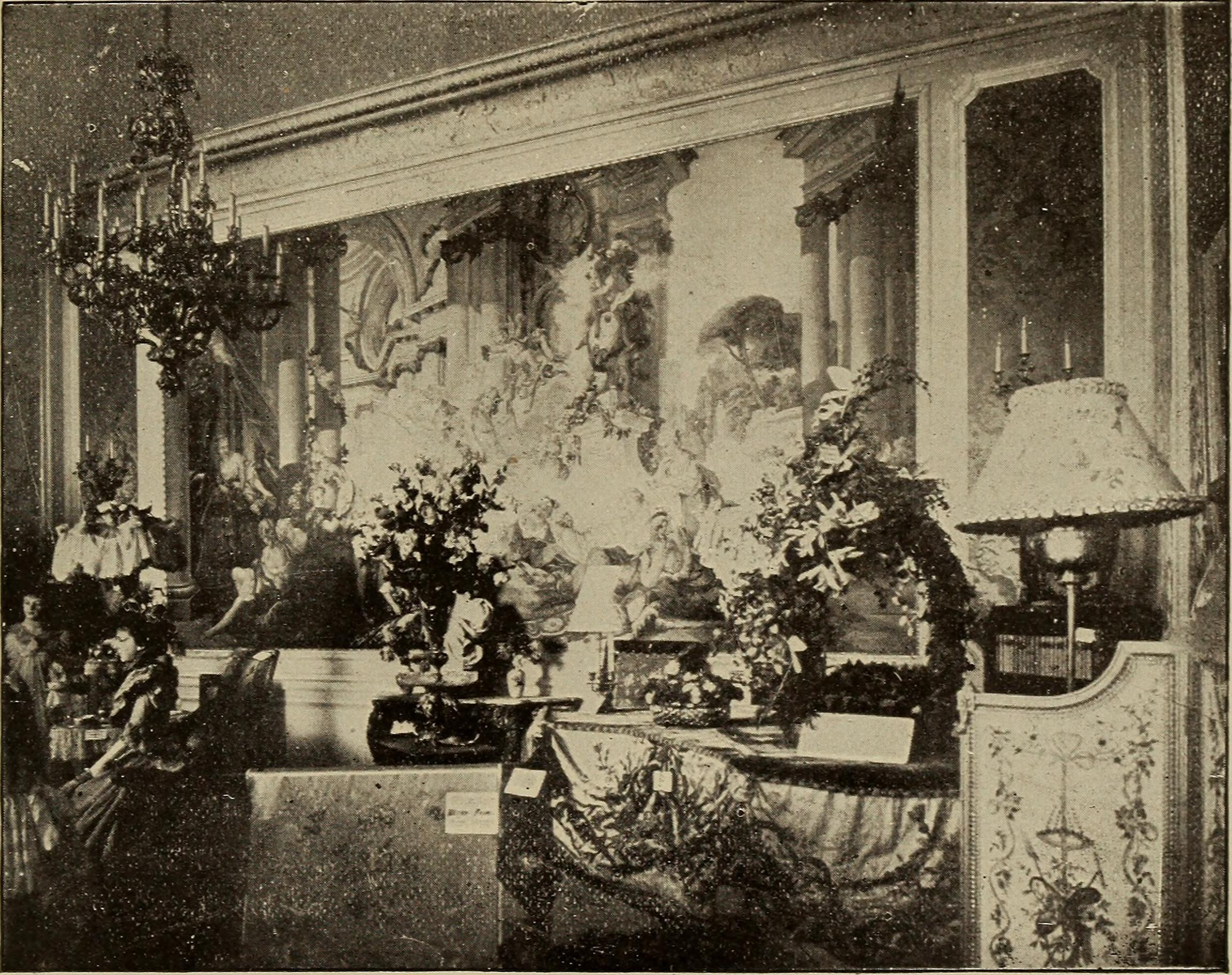
Part of the French Exhibit at the Woman's Building

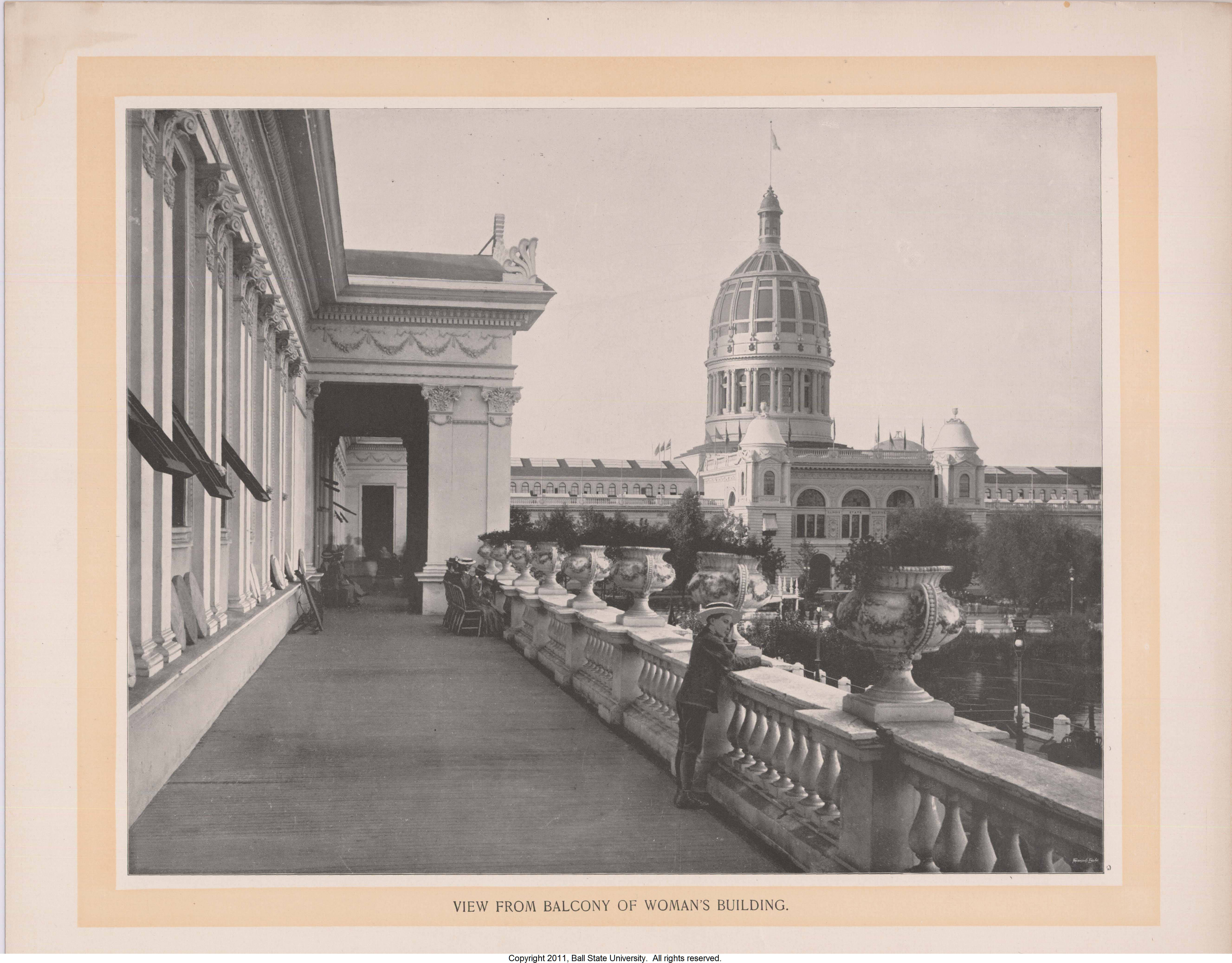
View from Balcony of Woman's Building, William Henry Jackson, 1893

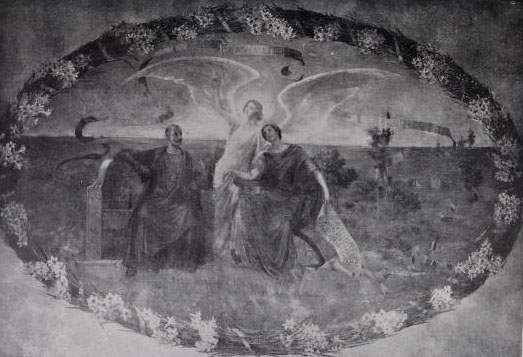
Library Ceiling Mural by Dora Wheeler Keith

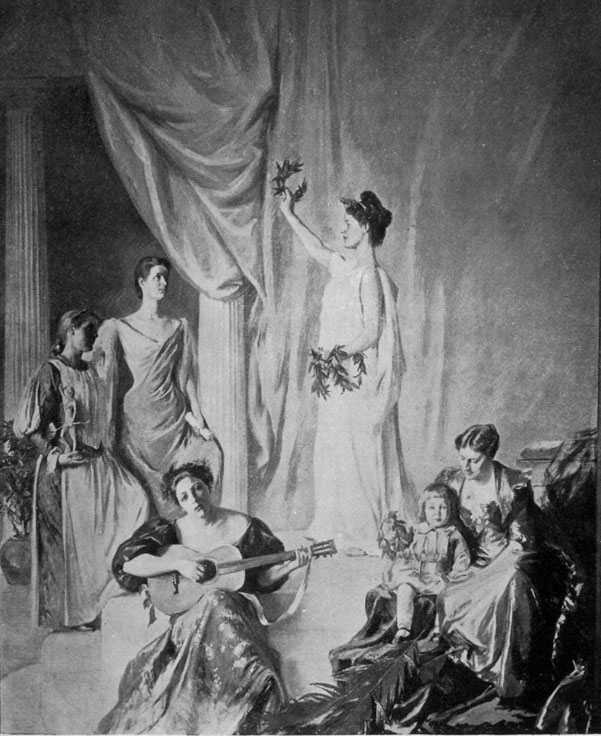
mural The Republic's Welcome to Her Daughters by Rosina Emmet Sherwood

== See also ==
- List of women artists exhibited at the 1893 World's Columbian Exposition
- White Rabbits (sculptors), a group of women who created statues for the Horticultural Building
- World's Congress of Representative Women, a week-long convention for the voicing of women's concerns, held at the Fair in May 1893
- Women's Building (disambiguation), other structures with a similar name
