= Alice Rideout =

American sculptor (c.1871–1953)

- Born: Marysville, California, U.S.
- Known for: architectural sculpture
- Spouse: Fred Canady

Alice Louise Rideout (c. October 1871-April 18, 1953) was an American sculptor born in Marysville, California who is primarily known for her work on The Woman's Building at the 1893 World's Columbian Exposition in Chicago.

== Biography ==
Alice Rideout was born in Marysville, California. Her father was Captain J. Ransom Rideout. He had a fleet of steamers on San Francisco Bay.

As a girl Rideout moved to San Francisco, where she attended high school. While growing up her passion for design was celebrated by classmates, she would often design railway trains out of cotton spools. She went on to attend the San Francisco School of Design, where she studied with Rupert Schmid who had discovered her through a recommendation by a high school art teacher. During Rideout and Schmid's first meeting, she arrived at his studio before him and her pet dog knocked over and smashed one of his statues. She gathered the broken fragments and desperately tried piecing them back together before Schmid arrived. So absorbed in the work she did not realize that Schmid had entered watching her. He was so struck by her ability that no further interview was necessary and she became his pupil.

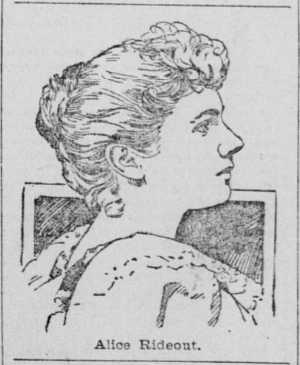

At the age of 19 Rideout won a competition to produce the architectural sculpture for the pediment of the Woman's Building at the 1893 World Fair.

After the Fair Rideout returned to San Francisco and married Fred Canady. She abandoned her art career, and moved to New York, where she remarried, and "disappeared from history."

For the decorative, as for the structural scheme, designs were invited among women qualified for such work throughout the United States, and after eager and close competition the prize was awarded to Alice Rideout, of San Francisco. The pediment and symbolic groups of the roof-garden were her work. On the roof were winged groups typical of feminine characteristics and virtues, in choicest symbolism. One of the central figures represented the spirituality of woman, and at her feet a pelican, emblem of love and sacrifice. In the same group charity was side by side with virtue, and sacrifice was further symbolized by a nun, placing her jewels on the altar. Another group represented the genius of civilization, a student at her right and a woman at her left struggling through darkness for the light. All these and other groups represent the genius and labor of Miss Alice Rideout. The center of the pediment was occupied by Minerva with Wisdom's owl at her feet, and on either side, women's work in the progress of civilization was typified by literature, art, and home life.

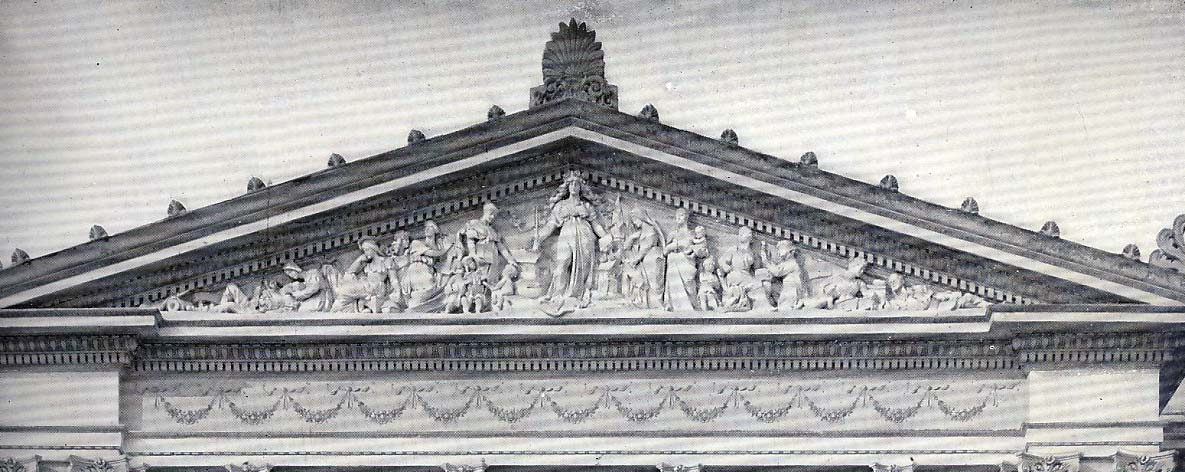
Pediment of the Women's Building
