= Herbert C. Ridout =

British journalist, editor and writer (1881-1948)

- Born: 1881; Marylebone, London
- Died: 11 October 1948 (aged 66–67); London
- Occupations: Journalist, editor, radio presenter

Herbert Currington Ridout (1881 – 11 October 1948) was a British journalist, editor, and short story writer. He was head of publicity for the British branch of Columbia Records, wrote for The Gramophone, and claimed to have invented the idea of gramophone record sleeve notes. He is credited on the label of a number of recordings held by archives but his exact involvement in their creation is unclear. His series of articles for The Gramophone titled "Behind the Needle" (1940–43), has become a primary source for the early history of recorded music in Britain. In later life he was a radio broadcaster for the BBC and an organiser for the Music Industries Council.

== Early life and family ==
Herbert Ridout was born in Marylebone, London, in 1881 to William Ridout, a waiter, and Ellen Ridout. He had brothers Ernest and Percy. He married Ethel.

== Career ==
In 1901 Ridout was working as a publisher's clerk. In 1904 he wrote an article titled "The Class to Whom Advertisements Appeal" for Mahin's Magazine, the house publication of the Mahin Advertising Company of Chicago which aimed to turn advertising into a science. By 1908 he was editor of the monthly journal Advertising. In that year his short story titled "The Great Scourge" was published in The Novel Magazine telling of how advertising was used to mitigate the effects of a serious case of food contamination. In the 1910s and 20s he was the London editor of Editor & Publisher magazine. In 1923 he was described as a journalist, living at 10 Radcliffe Road, Winchmore Hill, London N21.

His short story "The Freezing of London" (1909), set in 1972, tells of a scientist who releases a freezing gas in London that causes the death of millions after the British government reject his proposal to use the gas as a chemical weapon. The story was included in an anthology edited by Mike Ashley and published by the British Library in 2019 titled The End of the World: and Other Catastrophes and according to Ashley is remarkable for envisaging no technological progress since it was written.

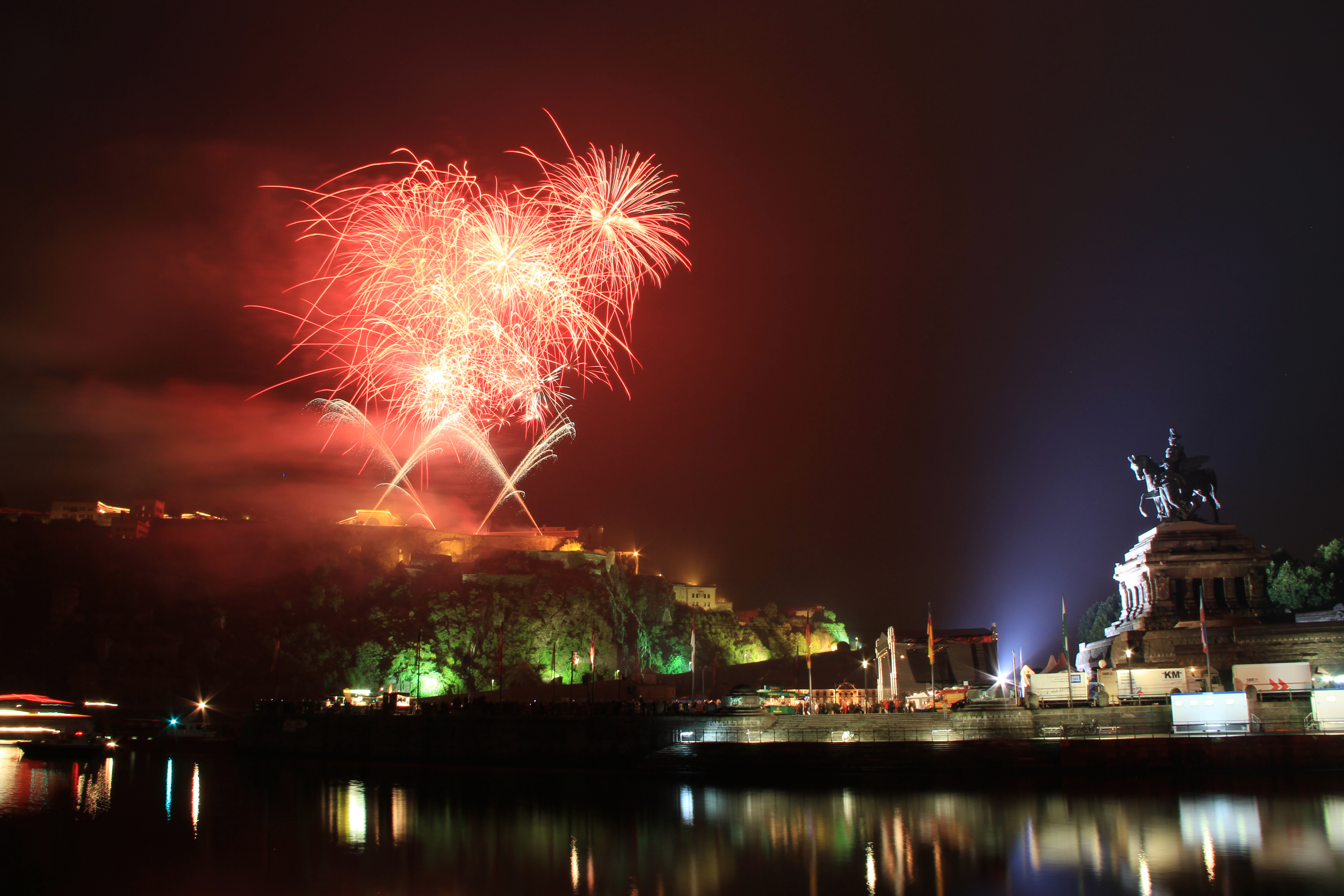
Rhein in Flammen, 2011.

Ridout worked as publicity manager for the British branch of Columbia Records. He claimed in The Gramophone in 1940 that in 1925 he invented the idea of sleeve notes for gramophone records when he employed the musician Harry Wild to write notes for a series of classical recordings that the company was issuing. The notes aimed to "educate the listener who wished to improve his musical taste". The series, titled "Behind the Needle" (1940–43), has been used as a primary source for the early history of recorded music in Britain, containing information about the business, recording techniques, and artists, such as the unprecedented and almost overnight demand for the popular song "You Made Me Love You (I Didn't Want to Do It)" in 1913 which required a special order of 25,000 copies from Columbia U.S.

In 1936, after he saw the Rhein in Flammen (Rhine in Flames) firework display, he wrote to The Times with a proposal to "set the Thames on fire" from Hammersmith to Richmond to celebrate the coronation of King George VI in 1937.

He presented music programmes on BBC radio such as Gramophone, which in 1939 was billed as showing "how the recording engineer and artist have combined." In 1941 he wrote to The Times as an "occasional broadcaster" about the difficulty of ensuring that broadcasts ran to time, particularly when verbose guests spoke for too long.

== Later life ==
Ridout's last job was as organiser for the Music Industries Council where he served for 15 years. He resigned in 1948 due to ill health but continued as editor of I.A.M.A. News. He died in London on 11 October 1948. Probate was granted to Doris Ethel Ridout, spinster, on an estate of £3,393.

== Selected publications ==
- "The Class to Whom Advertisements Appeal", Mahin's Magazine, Vol. 3 (1904).
- "The Great Scourge", The Novel Magazine, July 1908.
- "The Freezing of London", Harmsworth's Red Magazine, March 1909.
- "Behind the Needle", The Gramophone, series 1940–43.
- "An Appreciation of Charles B. Gregory", The Gramophone, Vol. 24, No. 10 (March 1946)

== Recordings crediting Herbert C. Ridout ==
- "Arrival of the British Troops in France, 1 of 2." Regal, n.d.
- "Arrival of the British Troops in France, 2 of 2." Regal, n.d.
- "With the fleet in action – off Heligoland." n.d.
- "The sleeping princess; Puss-in-boots." Columbia, n.d. (Told by Bransby Williams)

== See also ==
- Albert Ketèlbey (friend and colleague at Columbia)
