= The Lonely Palette =

Art history podcast

- Genre: Art history
- Language: English

Cast and voices
- Hosted by: Tamar Avishai

Publication
- No. of episodes: 71, plus 4 bonus (as of June 2026)
- Original release: 2016
- Provider: Hub & Spoke

Related
- Website: www.thelonelypalette.com

The Lonely Palette is an art history podcast hosted by Tamar Avishai, a lecturer at the Museum of Fine Arts, Boston. In each episode, Avishai focuses on a single work of art, explaining its historical context and significance. The podcast has been received positively by critics and won several awards.

== Format ==
Each episode examines a single work of art. Avishai begins with a montage of person on the street interviews with museum-goers at the Museum of Fine Arts reacting to the work. She then explains its historical context and significance.

== Reception ==
The podcast has been received positively and recognized on a number of best-of lists. It won The Improper Bostonian's 2018 best podcast award.

== Episodes ==
No.	Title	Original release date
1	"Paul Cézanne's Fruit and Jug on a Table (c. 1890–94)"	May 11, 2016
2	"Christian Boltanski's Lumieres (blue square – Sylvie) (2000)"	May 24, 2016
3	"John Singleton Copley's Portrait of Samuel Adams (1771)"	June 7, 2016
4	"Edgar Degas' Duchessa di Montejasi with Her Daughters, Elena and Camilla (c. 1876)"	June 21, 2016
5	"Andy Warhol's Red Disaster (1962)"	July 5, 2016
6	"Pablo Picasso's Portrait of a Woman (1910)"	July 20, 2016
7	"Claude Monet's Rouen Cathedral Series (1892–94)"	September 7, 2016
8	"Richard Serra's Torqued Ellipses (1998)"	September 21, 2016
9	"Ernst Ludwig Kirchner's Reclining Nude (1909)"	October 5, 2016
10	"Piet Mondrian's Composition with Red, Yellow, and Blue (1927)"	October 26, 2016
11	"John Singer Sargent's The Daughters of Edward Darley Boit (1882)"	November 15, 2016
12	"Jackson Pollock's Number 10 (1949)"	December 14, 2016
13	"Edward Hopper's Room in Brooklyn (1932)"	January 4, 2017
14	"Paul Gauguin's Where Do We Come From? What Are We? Where Are We Going? (1897–98)"	January 25, 2017
15	"El Anatsui's Black River (2009)"	March 8, 2017
16	"Vincent van Gogh's Postman Joseph Roulin (1888)"	March 29, 2017
17	"Marcel Duchamp's Fountain (1917)"	April 18, 2017
18	"J. M. W. Turner's The Slave Ship (1840)"	May 24, 2017
19	"Guanyin, Bodhisattva of Compassion (Song Dynasty, 12th c. CE)"	June 14, 2017
20	"Henryk Ross's Photographs of the Lodz Ghetto"	July 5, 2017
21	"Mary Cassatt's In the Loge (1878)"	September 6, 2017
22	"Jasper Johns' Target (1961)"	September 27, 2017
23	"Umberto Boccioni's Forms of Continuity in Space (1913)"	November 1, 2017
24	"Meditations on Mark Rothko"	November 22, 2017
25	"Mission: Mona Lisa"	December 22, 2017
26	"C.M. Coolidge's Dogs Playing Poker (1903)"	February 15, 2018
27	"Roy Lichtenstein's Ohhh...Alright... (1964)"	March 7, 2018
28	"Yoko Ono's Cut Piece (1964)"	March 29, 2018
29	"Egon Schiele's Nude Self-Portrait (1910)"	April 26, 2018
30	"Donatello's Madonna of the Clouds (c.1425–1435)"	May 31, 2018
31	"Hiroshi Sugimoto's Byrd Theater, Richmond, 1993 (1993)"	July 12, 2018
32	"René Magritte' The Son of Man (1964)"	August 28, 2018
33	"Jean-Honoré Fragonard's The Desired Moment (c. 1770)"	September 13, 2018
34	"Dance Dance Revolution"	November 14, 2018
35	"Cecilia Vicuña's Disappeared Quipu (2018)"	December 14, 2018
36	"Behold the Monkey"	January 31, 2019
37	"Ansel Adams' The Tetons and Snake River, Grand Teton National Park, Wyoming (1942)"	March 15, 2019
38	"Wassily Kandinsky's Untitled (1922)"	March 28, 2019
39	"Rembrandt van Rijn's Portrait of Aeltje Uylenburgh (1632)"	June 7, 2019
40	"Frida Kahlo's Dos Mujeres (Salvadora y Herminia) (1928)"	July 19, 2019
41	"Jan van Eyck's Arnolfini Portrait (1434)"	November 29, 2019
42	"Katsushika Hokusai's The Great Wave off Kanagawa (C.1829–1831)"	February 26, 2020
43	"Carmen Herrera's Blanco y Verde (no. 1) (1962)"	March 1, 2020
44	"Louise Bourgeois' Pillar (1949–50)"	March 8, 2020
45	"Georgia O'Keeffe's Deer's Skull With Pedernal (1936)"	March 15, 2020
46	"Patty Chang's Melons (At A Loss) (1998)"	March 22, 2020
47	"Georges Seurat's A Sunday Afternoon on La Grande Jatte (1884)"	May 4, 2020
48	"Anselm Kiefer's Margarete and Sulamith (1981)"	August 3, 2020
49	"Claes Oldenburg's Giant Toothpaste Tube (1964)"	September 10, 2020
50	"Carrie Mae Weems's Not Manet's Type (1997)"	December 4, 2020
51	"Mary Kelly's Post-Partum Document (1973-79)"	February 18, 2021
52	"Ólafur Elíasson's Untitled (Spiral) (2017)"	April 1, 2021
53	"Painting Edo, Post-Pandemic"	June 8, 2021
54	"Grant Wood's American Gothic (1930)"	September 29, 2021
55	"Harriet Powers' Pictorial Quilt (1859-98)"	October 29, 2021
56	"Memorials (Collaboration with Hi-Phi Nation)"	December 22, 2021
57	"Juno, A Colossal Roman Sculpture (late 1st c. BCE)"	March 31, 2022
58	"Odili Donald Odita's Cut (2016)"	April 28, 2022
59	"Sarah Sze's Fallen Sky (2021)"	June 3, 2022
60	"Caravaggio's The Crucifixion of St. Andrew (1607)"	December 9, 2022
61	"Under the Midnight Sun"	December 16, 2022
62	"Helen Frankenthaler's Madame Butterfly (2000)"	June 7, 2023
63	"James Abbott McNeill Whistler's Symphony in Whilte, No: 1: The White Girl (1861-62)"	July 5, 2023
64	"Barbara Kruger's Untitled (Your Body is a Battleground) (1989)"	August 3, 2023
65	"Sandro Botticelli's The Birth of Venus (c. 1485-86)"	September 11, 2023
66	"Bringing Monuments Home (From PRX's Monumental)"	March 6, 2024
67	"Cy Twombly's Second Voyage to Italy (Second Version) (1962)"	January 27, 2024
68	"Felix Gonzalez-Torres' Untitled (March 5) #2 (1991)"	February 21, 2025
69	"Yee Soo-kyung's Translated Vase (2011)"	April 4, 2025
70	"Norman Rockwell's Freedon of Speech (1943)"	July 4, 2025
71	"In Plain Sight: The National Gallery of Art x The Lonely Palette"	July 24, 2025

=== Special Episodes ===
No.	Title	Original release date
0	"Art! What is it Good For?"	May 4, 2016
0.2	"Introducing Hub & Spoke (by way of Soonish)"	October 25, 2017

=== Interviews ===
No.	Title	Original release date
TBA	"Keepers of the Culture: A Celebration Of Maduna And Holmes (Live Event at the PRX Podcast Garage)"	February 7, 2018
TBA	"Cecilia Vicuña, Poet & Artist"	December 14, 2018
TBA	"Dan Byers, Director of the Carpenter Center, Harvard University"	March 28, 2019
TBA	"The Guerrilla Girls, Feminist Activists & Artists"	November 12, 2019
TBA	"Ralph Steadman, Artist & Illustrator"	December 18, 2019
