= Antwerp, New York =

- Town
- Location within New York Location within the United States
- Coordinates: 44°12′07″N 75°36′57″W
- Country: United States
- State: New York
- County: Jefferson
- Settled: 1803
- Named for: Antwerp, Belgium

Government
  - Type: Town council
  - Town supervisor: John R. Shaw (R)
  - Council members: List: • Kenneth Bressett (R); • Walter L. Cooper (R); • Elizabeth A. Lynch (R); • Marjorie Sands (D)

Area
  - Total: 108.56 sq mi (281.16 km^{2})
  - Land: 106.18 sq mi (275.01 km^{2})
  - Water: 2.38 sq mi (6.16 km^{2})

Population (2020)
  - Total: 1,683
  - Density: 15.85/sq mi (6.12/km^{2})
- Time zone: UTC-5 (EST)
  - Summer (DST): UTC-4 (EDT)
- ZIP Codes: 13608, 13671 (Antwerp); 13642 (Gouverneur); 13673 (Philadelphia); 13691 (Theresa)
- FIPS code: 3604502297

Antwerp is a town in Jefferson County, New York, United States. The population was 1,683 at the 2020 census. The town is named after Antwerp, Belgium, the home of the early investors in the town, who had organized under the name of the Antwerp Company.

The town of Antwerp contains a village also called Antwerp. The town is at the eastern corner of the county and is northeast of Watertown.

== History ==
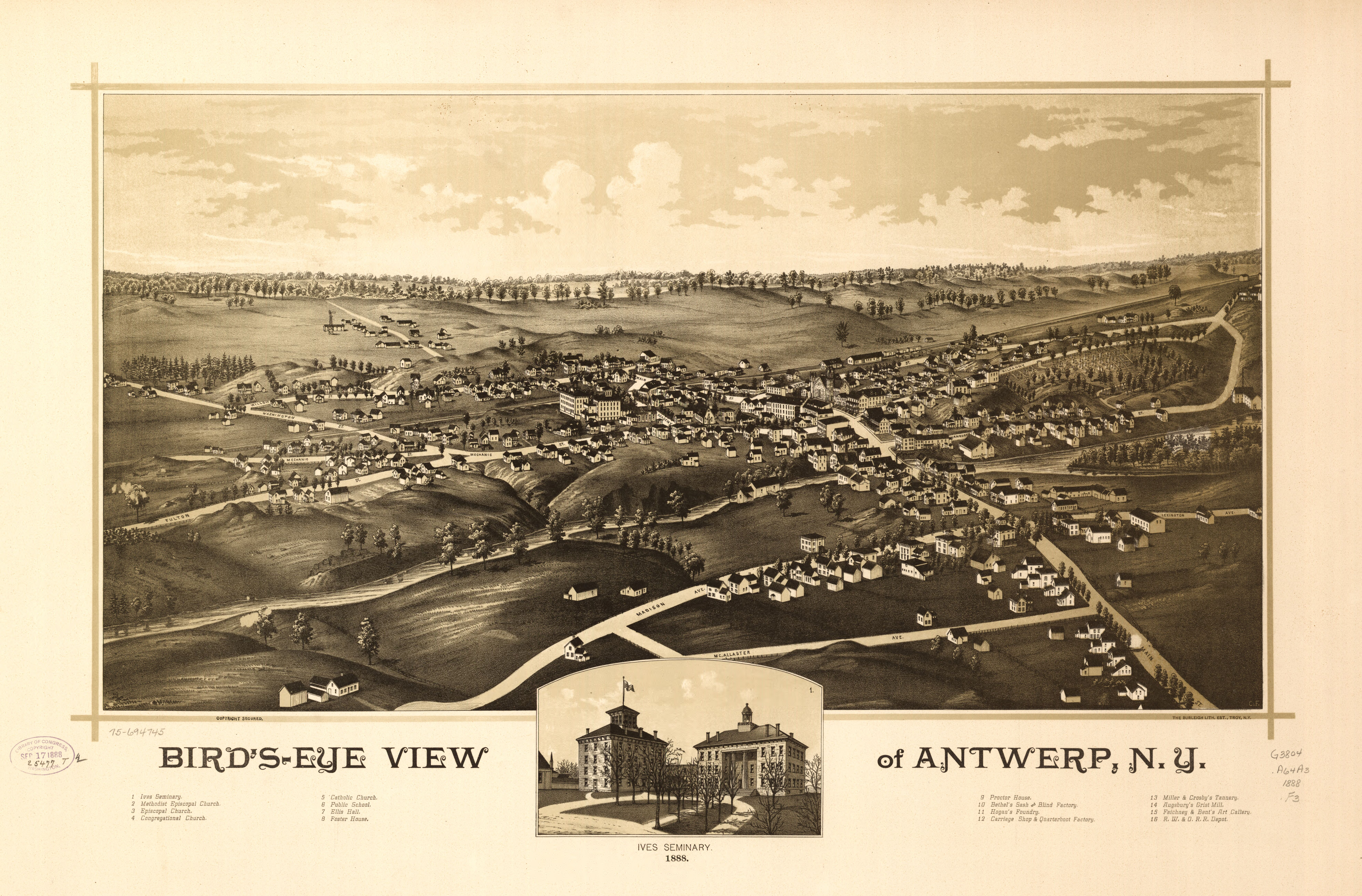
Perspective map of Antwerp from 1888 with list of landmarks and inset image of Ives Seminary, published by L. R. Burleigh

Settlement began circa 1803 near what is now Oxbow. The town was created from part of the town of Le Ray in 1810. In 1855, the town had the second largest number of cows in New York.

== Geography ==
According to the United States Census Bureau, the town has a total area of 108.6 square miles (281.2 km^{2}), of which 106.2 square miles (275.0 km^{2}) are land and 2.4 square miles (6.2 km^{2}), or 2.19%, are water.

The northeastern town line is the border of St. Lawrence County. The southeastern town line is the border of Lewis County.

The Oswegatchie River flows through the northern part of the town and loops back at Oxbow.

U.S. Route 11, a northeast to southwest highway, passes through the town.

The southeastern portion of Antwerp contains part of the Fort Drum Military Reservation.

== Demographics ==
Historical population
Census	Pop.	Note	%±
1820	1,319		—
1830	2,412		82.9%
1840	3,109		28.9%
1850	2,665		−14.3%
1860	3,313		24.3%
1870	3,310		−0.1%
1880	3,414		3.1%
1890	3,095		−9.3%
1900	3,008		−2.8%
1910	2,848		−5.3%
1920	2,569		−9.8%
1930	2,292		−10.8%
1940	2,187		−4.6%
1950	1,781		−18.6%
1960	1,905		7.0%
1970	1,794		−5.8%
1980	1,859		3.6%
1990	1,856		−0.2%
2000	1,793		−3.4%
2010	1,846		3.0%
2020	1,683		−8.8%
US Decennial Census

=== 2000 census ===
As of the 2000 United States census, there were 1,793 people, 621 households, and 453 families in the town. The population density was 16.88/sqmi (6.52/km^{2}). There were 717 housing units at an average density of 6.75/sqmi (2.61/km^{2}). The racial makeup of the town was 97.99% White, 0.39% Black or African American, 0.06% Native American, 0.33% Asian, 0.39% from other races, and 0.84% from two or more races. Hispanic or Latino of any race were 1.56% of the population.

There were 621 households, out of which 35.9% had children under the age of 18 living with them, 58.0% were married couples living together, 8.5% had a female householder with no husband present, and 26.9% were non-families. 20.8% of all households were made up of individuals, and 9.5% had someone living alone who was 65 years of age or older. The average household size was 2.89 and the average family size was 3.32.

In the town, the population was spread out, with 29.8% under the age of 18, 9.1% from 18 to 24, 27.3% from 25 to 44, 24.1% from 45 to 64, and 9.6% who were 65 years of age or older. The median age was 35 years. For every 100 females, there were 102.6 males. For every 100 females age 18 and over, there were 99.8 males.

The median income for a household in the town was $34,250, and the median income for a family was $40,192. Males had a median income of $28,824 versus $21,250 for females. The per capita income for the town was $13,097. About 12.3% of families and 17.6% of the population were below the poverty line, including 22.5% of those under age 18 and 10.6% of those age 65 or over.

== Communities and locations in the town ==
- Antwerp – A village centrally located in the town by the Indian River and US-11.
- Bentleys Corners – A location in the western part of the town on County Road 23.
- Bishops Corners – A location in the western corner of the town on County Road 194.
- Fort Drum – A military reservation partly located in the southeastern part of the town.
- Halls Corners – A location in the western part of the town on County Road 28.
- Indian River – A stream and canoe trail that flows past Antwerp village.
- Keenes – A hamlet on the northeastern town line, partly in St. Lawrence County.
- Oxbow – A hamlet and census-designated place by the northeast border on County Road 25, located on the Oswegatchie River. It is the site of the first settlement, a tavern.
- Payne Lake – A small lake in the northern part of the town near Oxbow.
- Rices Corner – A hamlet in the eastern corner of the town and inside Fort Drum on County Road 24.
- Spragueville – A hamlet on the northeastern town line on County Road 26, partly in St. Lawrence County. It was formerly called "Spragues Corners".

== Notable people ==
Albert Woolson, an American Civil War veteran and the last surviving member of the Grand Army of the Republic, was born in Antwerp.

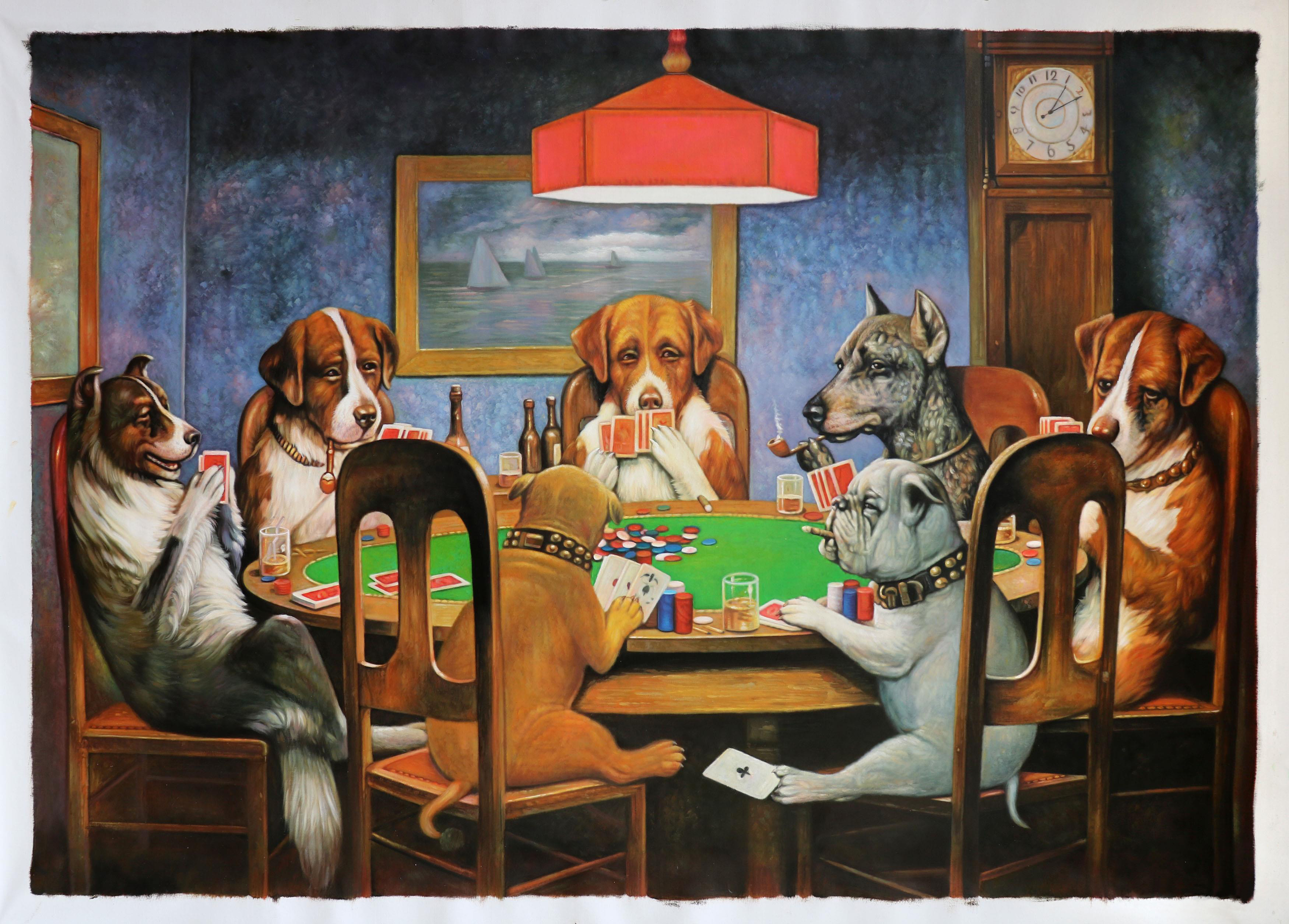
"A Friend in Need" from Dogs Playing Poker, by C. M. Coolidge

Artist Cassius Marcellus Coolidge, noted mainly for his paintings depicting dogs playing cards, was born and raised in Antwerp, started its first bank, and is buried there. He is also credited with inventing carnival cut-outs, the painted backdrops with faces missing, enabling individuals to pose for novelty photos.

Charles B. Hoard, businessman and member of the United States House of Representatives, lived in Antwerp and served as postmaster before relocating to Watertown in the 1840s.

John Harris, Wisconsin state senator and businessman, was born in Antwerp.

Writer Helen Hinsdale Rich, known as "The Poet of the Adirondacks", was born in Antwerp.
