= Kitsch =

Art or other objects that appeal to popular rather than high art tastes

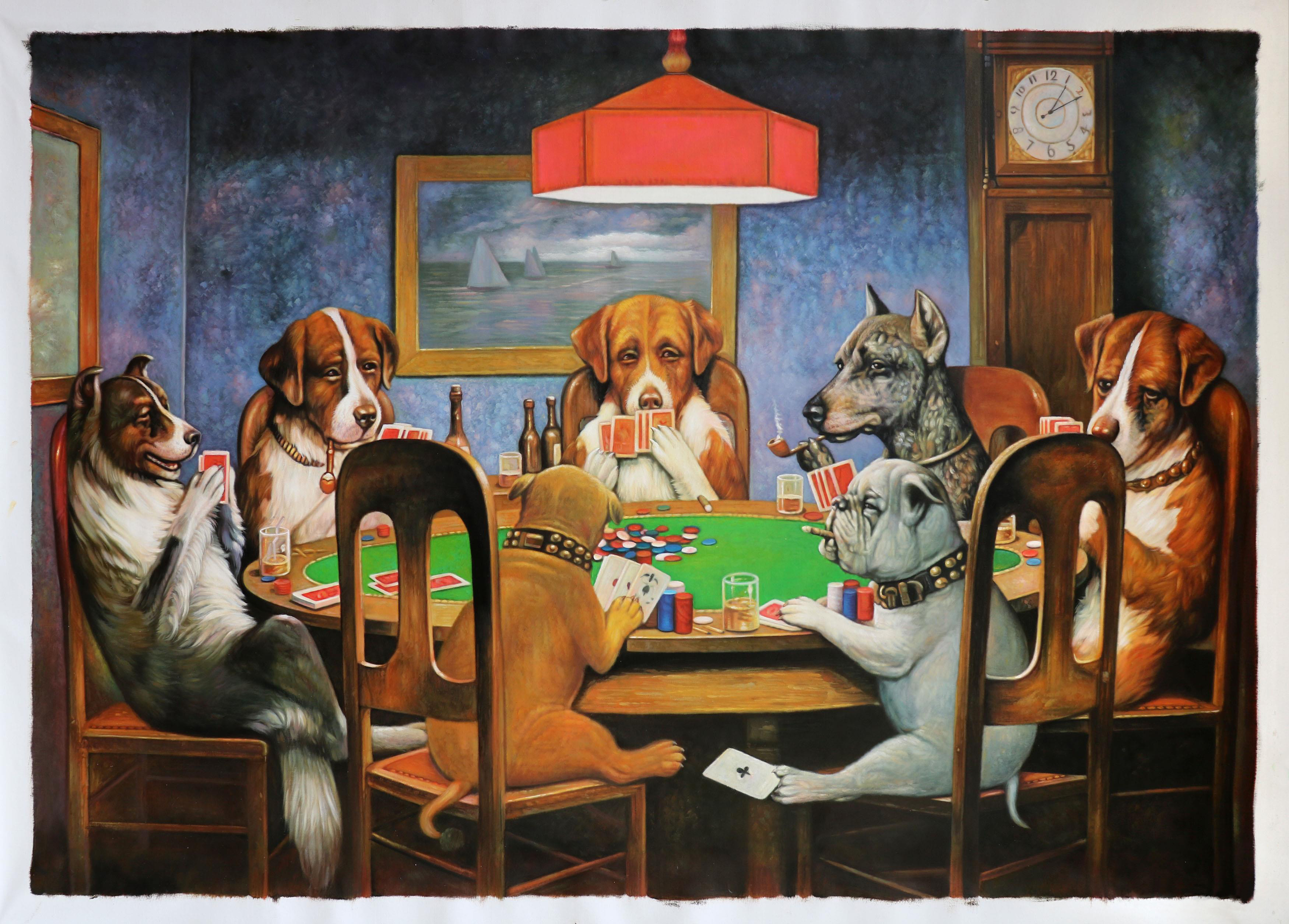
A Friend in Need, a 1903 Dogs Playing Poker painting by Cassius Marcellus Coolidge, is a common example of kitsch.

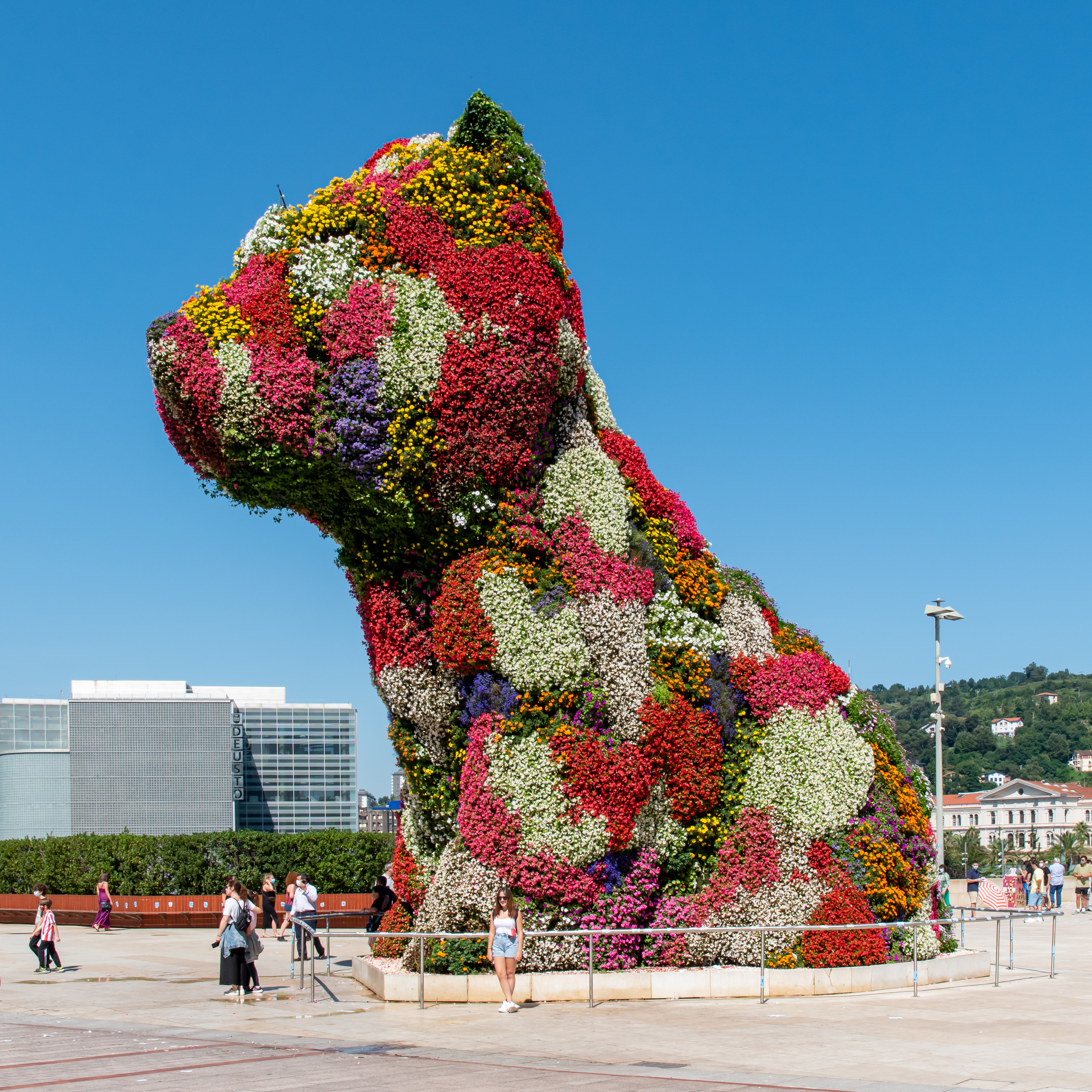
Puppy by Jeff Koons (2010) is a self-aware display of kitsch, specifically as a combination of opulence and cuteness.

Kitsch (/kɪtʃ/ KITCH; loanword from German) (Note: Despite being a direct borrowing from modern German, kitsch is most often left uncapitalized and without italics (cf. Gestalt, Sonderweg). Pronunciation may also be colloquially realized as /kɪʃ/ KISH.) is a term applied to art and design that is perceived as naïve imitation, overly eccentric, gratuitous, or of banal taste.

The modern avant-garde traditionally opposed kitsch for its melodramatic tendencies, its superficial relationship with the human condition and its vulgar standards of beauty. In the first half of the 20th century, kitsch was used in reference to mass-produced, pop-cultural products that lacked the conceptual depth of fine art. However, since the emergence of Pop Art in the 1950s, kitsch has taken on newfound highbrow appeal, often wielded in knowingly ironic, humorous or earnest manners.

To brand visual art as "kitsch" is often still pejorative, though not exclusively. Art deemed kitsch may be enjoyed in an entirely positive, sincere manner. For example, it carries the ability to be quaint or "quirky" without appearing offensive, as in the Dogs Playing Poker paintings.

Along with visual art, the quality of kitsch can be used to describe works of music, literature, or any other creative medium. Kitsch relates to camp, as they both incorporate irony and extravagance.

== History and analysis ==
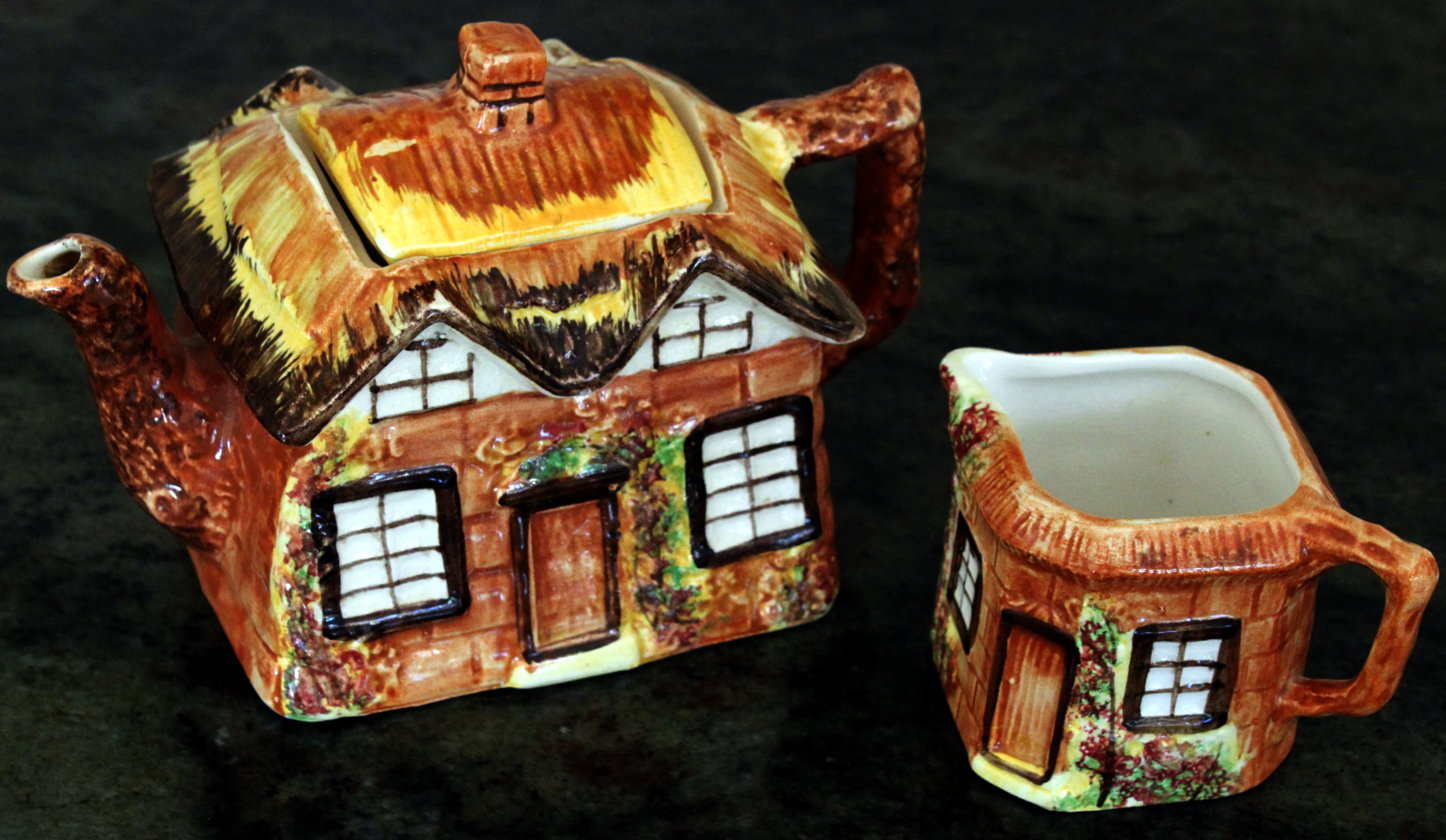
A mass-produced teapot and milk jug set, themed after a rural cottage

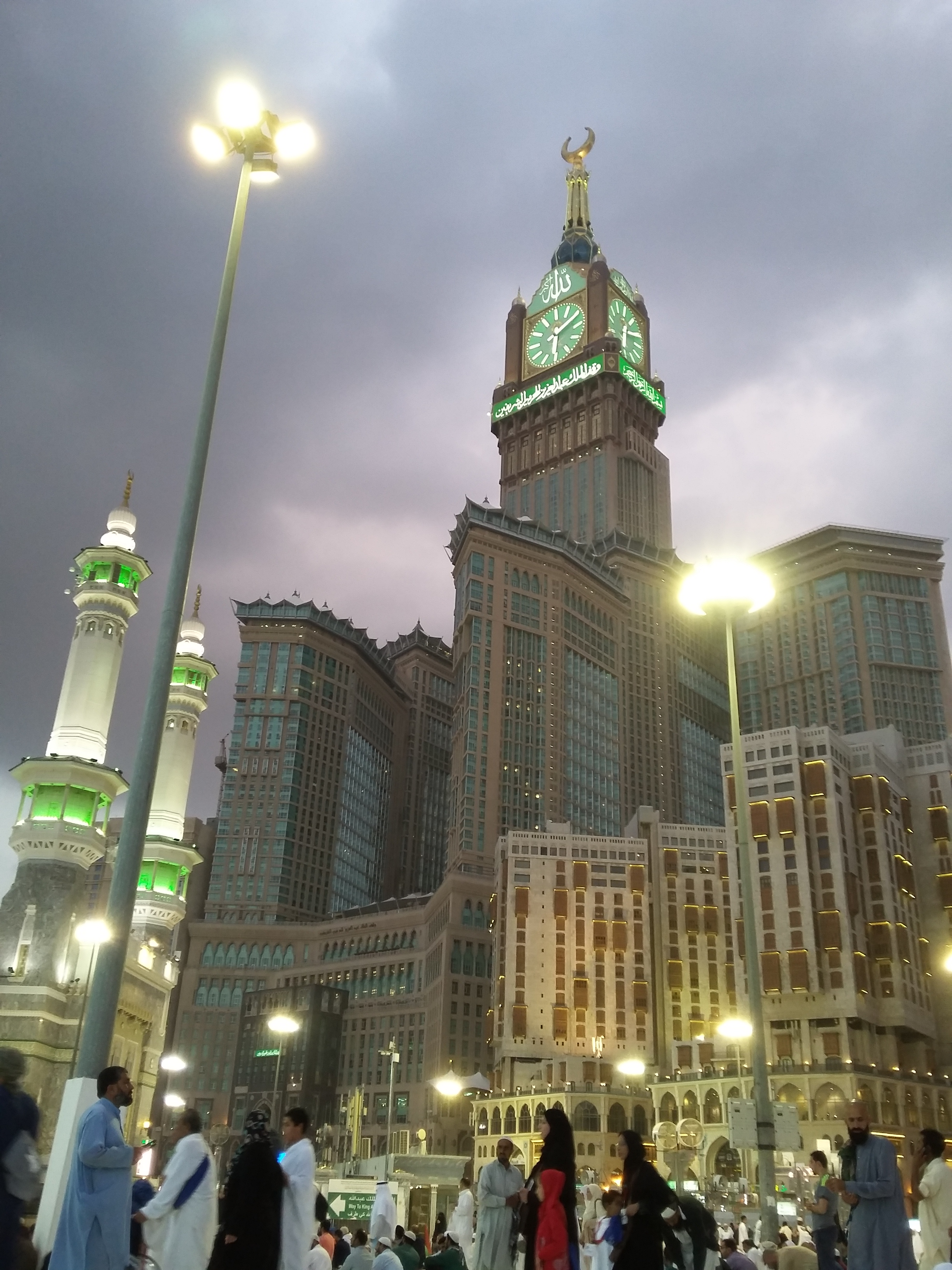
Abraj al Saat in Mecca has been described as kitsch.

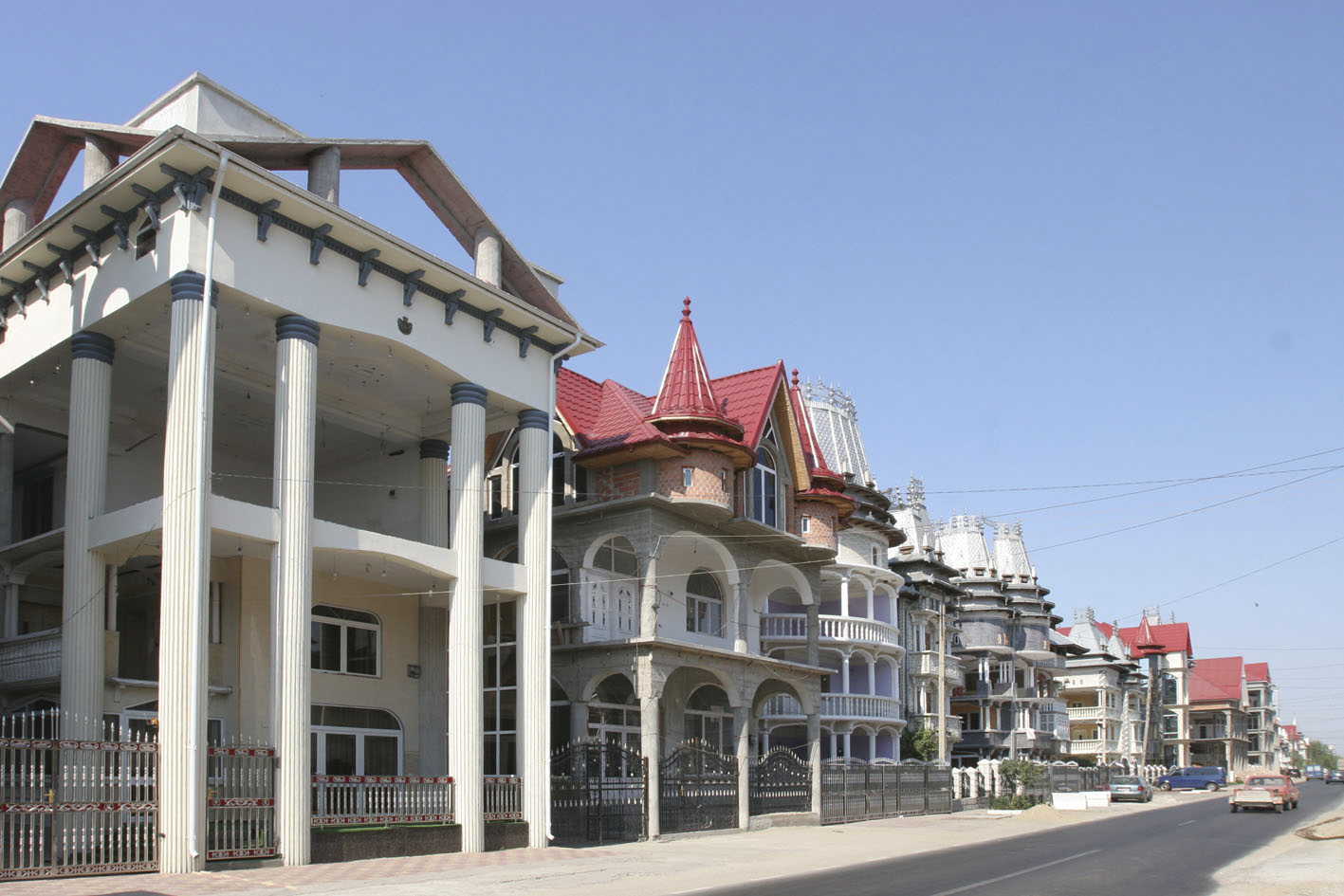
Examples of kitsch in architecture, Buzescu village in Romania

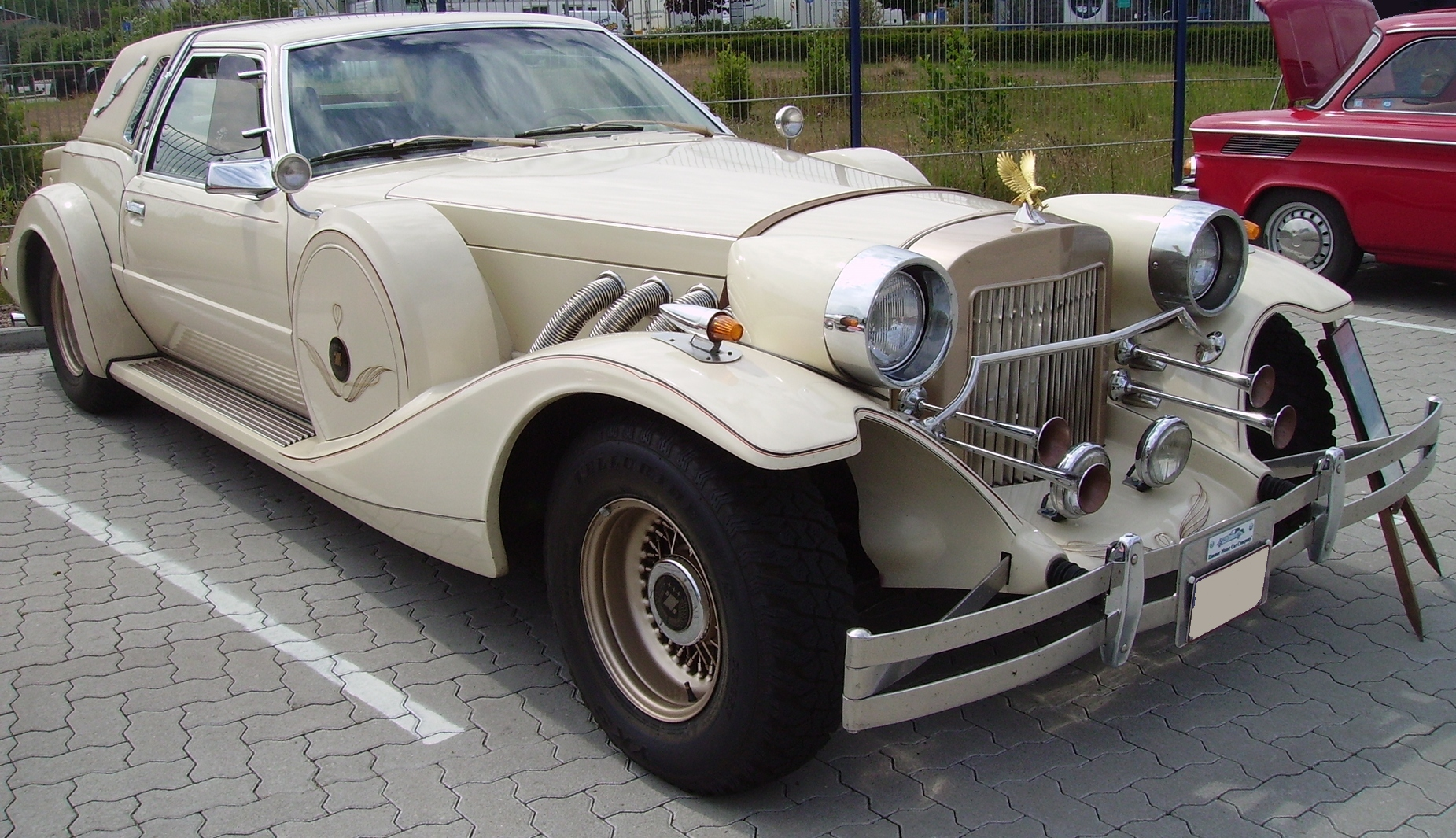
A 1980s Zimmer, as an example of kitsch in automotive design

As a descriptive term, kitsch originated in the art markets of Munich, Germany in the 1860s and the 1870s, describing cheap, popular, and marketable pictures and sketches. In Das Buch vom Kitsch (The Book of Kitsch), published in 1936, Hans Reimann defined it as a professional expression "born in a painter's studio".

The study of kitsch was done almost exclusively in Germany until the 1970s, with Walter Benjamin being an important scholar in the field.

Kitsch is regarded as a modern phenomenon, coinciding with social changes in recent centuries such as the Industrial Revolution, urbanization, mass production, modern materials and media such as plastics, radio and television, the rise of the middle class and public education—all of which have factored into a perception of oversaturation of art produced for the popular taste.

=== Kitsch in art theory and aesthetics ===
Modernist writer Hermann Broch argues that the essence of kitsch is imitation: kitsch mimics its immediate predecessor with no regard to ethics—it aims to copy the beautiful, not the good. According to Walter Benjamin, kitsch, unlike art, is a utilitarian object lacking all critical distance between object and observer. According to critic Winfried Menninghaus, Benjamin's stance was that kitsch "offers instantaneous emotional gratification without intellectual effort, without the requirement of distance, without sublimation". In a short essay from 1927, Benjamin observed that an artist who engages in kitschy reproductions of things and ideas from a bygone age deserved to be called a "furnished man" (in the way that someone rents a "furnished apartment" where everything is already supplied).

Kitsch is less about the thing observed than about the observer. According to Roger Scruton, "Kitsch is fake art, expressing fake emotions, whose purpose is to deceive the consumer into thinking he feels something deep and serious."

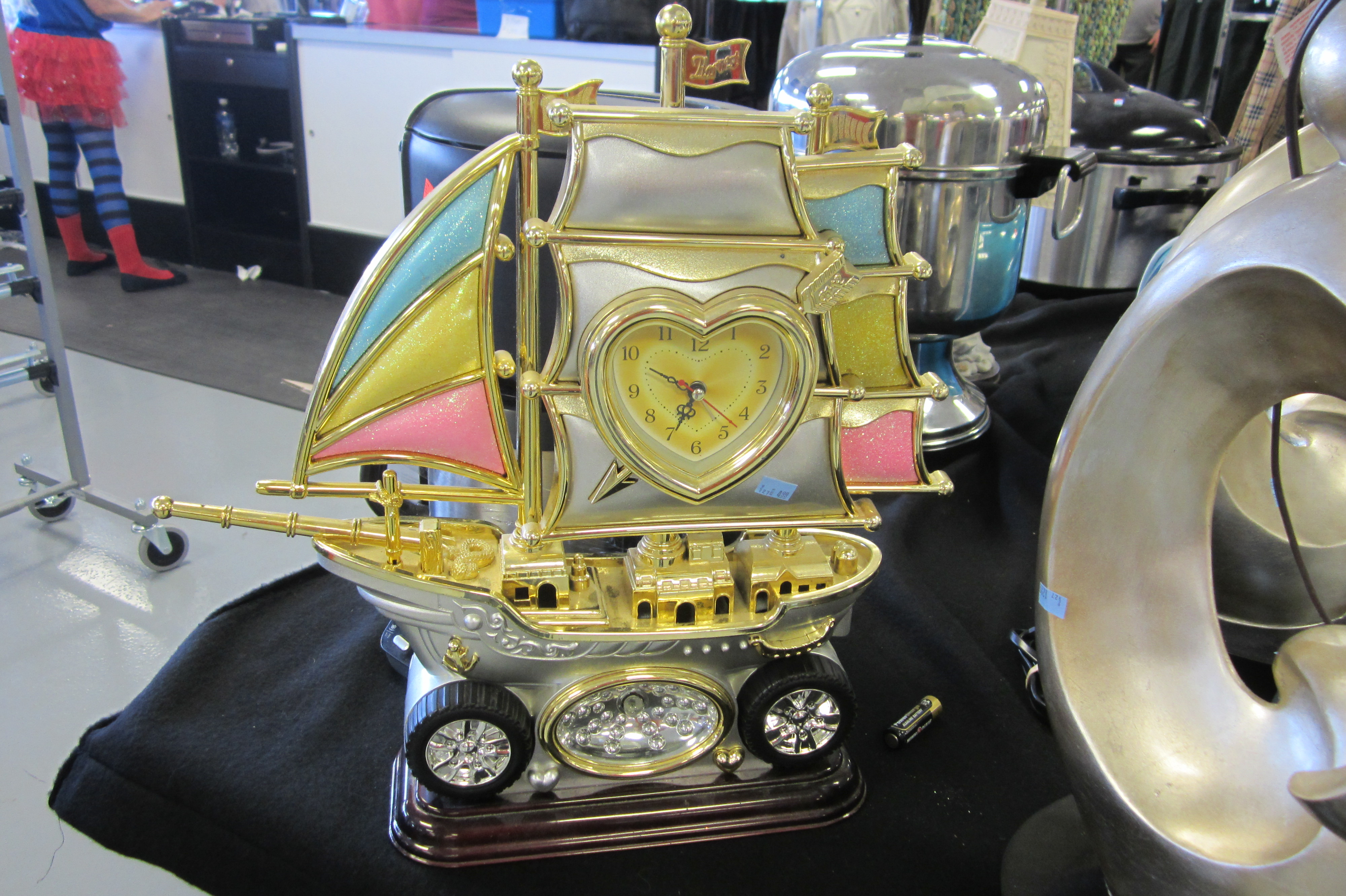
A nautical-themed clock and lamp ornament

Tomáš Kulka, in Kitsch and Art, starts from two basic facts that kitsch "has an undeniable mass-appeal" and is "considered (by the art-educated elite) bad", and then proposes three essential conditions:

1. Kitsch depicts a beautiful or highly emotionally charged subject;
2. The depicted subject is instantly and effortlessly identifiable;
3. Kitsch does not substantially enrich our associations related to the depicted subject.

=== Kitsch in Milan Kundera's The Unbearable Lightness of Being ===
The concept of kitsch is a central motif in Milan Kundera's 1984 novel The Unbearable Lightness of Being. Towards the end of the novel, the book's narrator posits that the act of defecation (and specifically, the shame that surrounds it) poses a metaphysical challenge to the theory of divine creation: "Either/or: either shit is acceptable (in which case don't lock yourself in the bathroom!) or we are created in an unacceptable manner". Thus, in order for us to continue to believe in the essential propriety and rightness of the universe (what the narrator calls "the categorical agreement with being"), we live in a world "in which shit is denied and everyone acts as though it did not exist". For Kundera's narrator, this is the definition of kitsch: an "aesthetic ideal" which "excludes everything from its purview which is essentially unacceptable in human existence".

The novel goes on to relate this definition of kitsch to politics, and specifically—given the novel's setting in Prague around the time of the 1968 invasion by the Soviet Union—to communism and totalitarianism. He gives the example of the Communist May Day ceremony, and of the sight of children running on the grass and the feeling this is supposed to provoke. This emphasis on feeling is fundamental to how kitsch operates:

Kitsch causes two tears to flow in quick succession. The first tear says: How nice to see children running on the grass! The second tear says: How nice to be moved, together with all mankind, by children running on the grass! It is the second tear that makes kitsch kitsch.

According to the narrator, kitsch is "the aesthetic ideal of all politicians and all political parties and movements"; however, where a society is dominated by a single political movement, the result is "totalitarian kitsch":

When I say "totalitarian," what I mean is that everything that infringes on kitsch must be banished for life: every display of individualism (because a deviation from the collective is a spit in the eye of the smiling brotherhood); every doubt (because anyone who starts doubting details will end by doubting life itself); all irony (because in the realm of kitsch everything must be taken quite seriously).

Kundera's concept of "totalitarian kitsch" has since been invoked in the study of the art and culture of regimes such as Stalin's Soviet Union, Nazi Germany, Fascist Italy and Iraq under Saddam Hussein. Kundera's narrator ends up condemning kitsch for its "true function" as an ideological tool under such regimes, calling it "a folding screen set up to curtain off death".

=== Melancholic kitsch vs. nostalgic kitsch ===
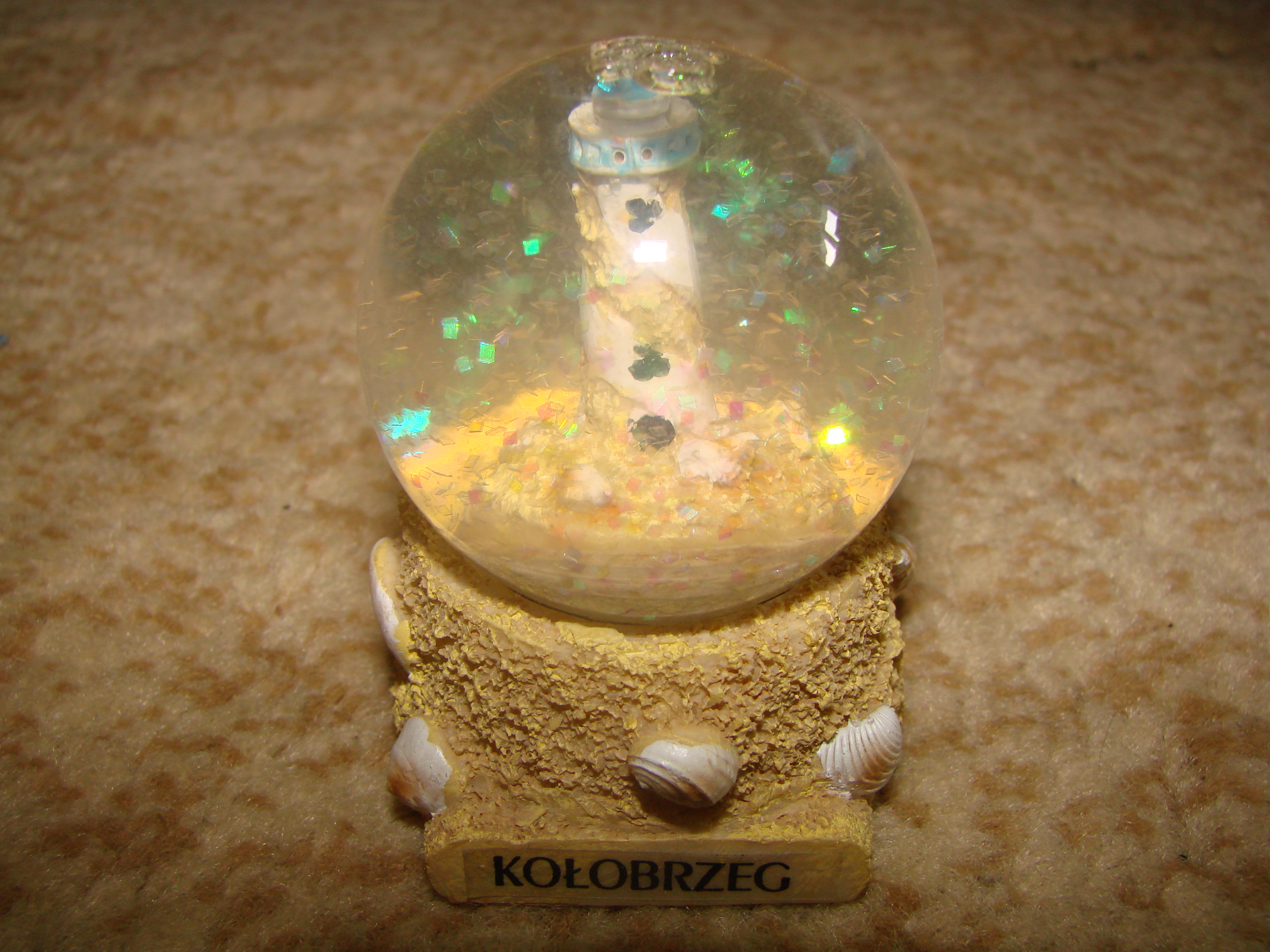
A souvenir snow globe with an underwater motif

In her 1999 book The Artificial Kingdom: A Treasury of the Kitsch Experience, cultural historian Celeste Olalquiaga develops a theory of kitsch that situates its emergence as a specifically nineteenth-century phenomenon, relating it to the feelings of loss elicited by a world transformed by science and industry. Focusing on examples such as paperweights, aquariums, mermaids and the Crystal Palace, Olalquiaga uses Benjamin's concept of the "dialectical image" to argue for the utopian potential of "melancholic kitsch", which she differentiates from the more commonly discussed "nostalgic kitsch".

These two types of kitsch correspond to two different forms of memory. Nostalgic kitsch functions through "reminiscence", which "sacrifices the intensity of experience for a conscious or fabricated sense of continuity":

Incapable of tolerating the intensity of the moment, reminiscence selects and consolidates an event's acceptable parts into a memory perceived as complete. […] This reconstructed experience is frozen as an emblem of itself, becoming a cultural fossil.

In contrast, melancholic kitsch functions through "remembrance", a form of memory that Olalquiaga links to the "souvenir", which attempts "to repossess the experience of intensity and immediacy through an object". While reminiscence translates a remembered event to the realm of the symbolic ("deprived of immediacy in favour of representational meaning"), remembrance is "the memory of the unconscious", which "sacrific[es] the continuity of time for the intensity of the experience". Far from denying death, melancholic kitsch can only function through a recognition of its multiple "deaths" as a fragmentary remembrance that is subsequently commodified and reproduced. It "glorifies the perishable aspect of events, seeking in their partial and decaying memory the confirmation of its own temporal dislocation".

Thus, for Olalquiaga, melancholic kitsch is able to function as a Benjaminian dialectical image: "an object whose decayed state exposes and reflects its utopian possibilities, a remnant constantly reliving its own death, a ruin".

== Further usage ==
=== Historical fiction ===
Jewish-American author Art Spiegelman coined the term "Holo-kitsch" to describe mass-market, overly sentimental depictions of the Holocaust from the end of the Cold War onwards, including works inspired by his own graphic novel on the subject, Maus. The term is usually used to criticize works seen as relying on melodrama and mass recognition to commercialize the experiences of Holocaust survivors, such as Life Is Beautiful or The Boy in the Striped Pajamas, but also includes more critically respected works like Polanski's The Pianist.

Swiss historian and anti-Semitism expert Stefan Maechler also commented on the role of kitsch sentimentality in the context of Wilkomirski syndrome, writing on Fragments: Memories of a Wartime Childhood that "once the professed interrelationship between the first-person narrator, the death-camp story he narrates, and historical reality are proved palpably false, what was a masterpiece becomes kitsch."

=== Reclamation ===
The Kitsch movement is an international movement of classical painters, founded in 1998 upon a philosophy proposed by Odd Nerdrum, which he clarified in his 2001 book On Kitsch, in cooperation with Jan-Ove Tuv and others incorporating the techniques of the Old Masters with narrative, romanticism, and emotionally charged imagery.

== See also ==
- Cliché – Overused, unoriginal phrase or opinion
- Lowbrow (art movement) – Underground visual art movement
- Museum of Bad Art – Art museum in Boston, Massachusetts
- Poshlost – Russian word for amorality, vulgarity, lack of originality, and bad taste
- Prolefeed—in Nineteen Eighty-Four, popular culture for entertaining Oceania's working class

Notable examples

- Velvet Elvis – Painting of Elvis Presley on velvet
- Chinese Girl – 1952 painting by Vladimir Tretchikoff
- Christmas cards – Major type of greeting cards
- Chocolate box art – Term describing idealistic paintings
- Thomas Kinkade – American painter (1958–2012)
