= You're in the Picture =

American television series – one episode 1961

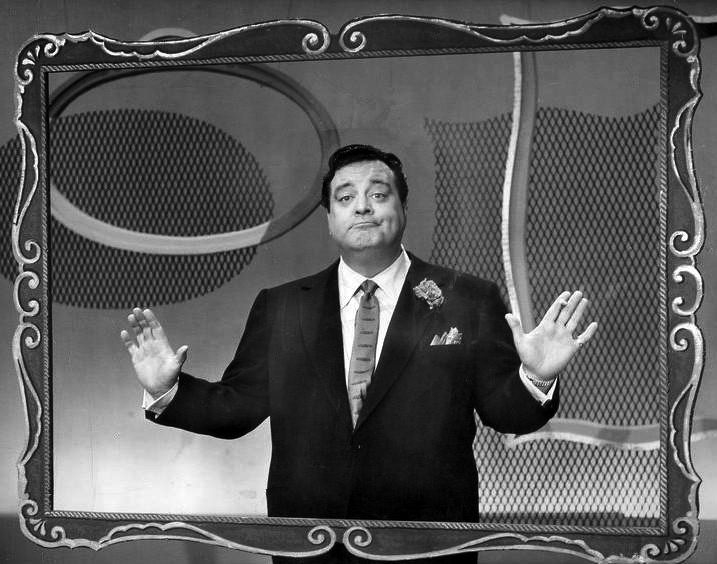
- Promotional photo for the show
- Created by: Don Lipp; Bob Synes
- Written by: Sydney Zelinka; James Shelton ("special material")
- Directed by: Seymour Robbie
- Presented by: Jackie Gleason (game); Dennis James (spokesman for Kellogg's)
- Starring: Pat Harrington Jr. Pat Carroll; Jan Sterling; Arthur Treacher
- Announcer: Johnny Olson
- Composer: Jackie Gleason
- Country of origin: United States
- No. of episodes: 2

Production
- Producer: Steve Carlin
- Running time: 30 minutes
- Production companies: Idees Grandes, Inc. and Solar Enterprises, Inc., in association with the CBS Television Network

Original release
- Network: CBS
- Release: January 20 – January 27, 1961

You're in the Picture is an American television game show that aired on CBS for only one episode on Friday, January 20, 1961 at 9:30pm.

The show, created by Don Lipp and Bob Synes, was an attempt by its host and star Jackie Gleason to "demonstrate versatility" after his success within variety shows and The Honeymooners. Gleason was joined by Johnny Olson as announcer and Dennis James doing live commercials for sponsor Kellogg's cereals.

Technically, the show could be said to have run for two episodes, since the following Friday, Gleason appeared at the same time, but in a studio "stripped to the brick walls" and using the time to give what Time magazine called an "inspiring post-mortem", asking rhetorically "how it was possible for a group of trained people to put on so big a flop." Time later cited You're in the Picture as one piece of evidence that the 1960–61 TV season was the "worst in the 13-year history of U.S. network television."

== Gameplay ==
A four-member celebrity panel would stick their heads into a life-sized illustration of a famous scene or song lyric with a hole cut out, then take turns asking yes/no questions to Gleason to try to figure out what scene they were a part of. If they were able to figure out the scene, 100 CARE Packages were donated in their name; if they were stumped, the packages were donated in Gleason's name. Live music was provided by a Dixieland band (supposedly arranged by Gleason himself, who had some experience in easy listening arrangements outside his television work) under the direction of Norman Leyden.

=== Panelists ===
The celebrity panel for the premiere consisted of Pat Harrington Jr., Pat Carroll, Jan Sterling, and Arthur Treacher.

Among the tableaux-like backdrops featured in the premiere were Pocahontas rescuing John Smith, three men ogling a girl in an "itsy bitsy teenie weenie yellow polka dot bikini", a depiction of four statues in The Metropolitan Museum of Art, and four members of Billy Watson's Burlesque Beef Trust.

== Satirical apology ==
"Ladies and gentlemen, I, uh, think you'll notice that there is no panel tonight. As a matter of fact there's nothing here, except the orchestra and myself. I'd like to modify that there is one other thing: we have a creed tonight, and the creed is 'honesty is the best policy'. [...] And the premise is this: last week we did a show called You're in the Picture, that laid, without a doubt, the biggest bomb. I'm telling you, friends, that I've seen bombs in my day. This would make the H-bomb look like a two-inch salute!"

The debut of You're in the Picture received negative reviews across the board. The following Friday (January 27), instead of the game, the broadcast—still identified on-screen with a title card stating You're in the Picture—consisted of Gleason sitting alone in a chair on the now-bare stage apologizing for the previous week's show. Stating that the series failed because of "the intangibles of show business," Gleason also noted that more than three hundred combined years' worth of show business experience had been involved in the production.

Gleason commented that the program "laid, without a doubt, the biggest bomb in history," adding that it "would make the H-Bomb look like a two-inch salute." Acknowledging the critics, he also stated that, "You don't have to be Alexander Graham Bell to pick up the phone and find out it's dead."

He included some topical remarks in the opening moments of the apology, joking that he had been set to go watch the Los Angeles Open golf tournament that was held on January 8, 1961. Gleason implied that it would have been more enjoyable to watch Arnold Palmer struggle on the 18th hole at Rancho Park where Palmer took a 12, or that Gleason could have gone on a cruise on a Portuguese ship and been spared from hosting the show, referencing the Santa Maria hijacking.

Gleason also recalled other flops he was involved in, adding at one point, "I wish I didn't know so much about these things." He then brought out the John Smith/Pocahontas illustration to show what the format for the game was for those "fortunate enough not to see last week's show." Gleason also fulfilled contractual obligations by incorporating live commercials into the broadcast. He noted that nobody commented on the quality of the show after it finished airing, instead mentioning how good the commercials were and that the show went off the air at the right time. Gleason ended his commentary with, "I'm coming back next week! I don't know what we're gonna do ... so, take my word for it ... tune in on the next chapter, because this might be the greatest 'soapless' opera you've ever seen!"

This comical half-hour apology got much better reviews than the game show. Gleason finished out his series commitment by renaming the program The Jackie Gleason Show and turning it into a talk/interview show, which lasted until March 24, 1961. Shortly after the series commitment was completed, CBS picked up on a more permanent basis another talk/variety program from Gleason, American Scene Magazine, which would run from 1962 to 1970.

However, due to a moment during the apology in which Gleason hinted that the coffee cup he was sipping from wasn't really filled with "coffee" (he called it "Chock Full O'Booze"), the show's original sponsor, Kellogg's, pulled out of the series a week later and publicly claimed, "This isn't the show we bought". They reportedly told CBS executives they were offended by the coffee cup reference, and wanted no further association with the show or Gleason. However, Liggett & Myers, the show's alternate sponsor, continued with the series until it ended. The supposedly "spiked" cup of coffee was a running gag Gleason often used as part of the monologue of his variety shows.

== Reception ==
Upon the premiere, the game show received extremely negative reviews.

In 2002, TV Guide ranked the series number 9 on its "50 Worst TV Shows of All Time" list.

In his book What Were They Thinking? The 100 Dumbest Events in Television History, author David Hofstede ranked the show at number 4 on the list.

== Episode status ==
Both the premiere and Gleason's apology exist and are available for viewing at the Paley Center for Media in New York City. Both appear to be from the original broadcasts, as both have the original commercials intact. The apology episode is widely circulated on video-sharing sites such as YouTube.

In an October 18, 1985, Tonight Show interview with Gleason, Johnny Carson stated that he "was also a part of the show"; surviving clips do not show him, however. Pat Carroll confirmed that Carson had been involved in an episode but stated he left before taping: "Johnny Carson was supposed to be on it. But he did one rehearsal and we never saw him again. He knew better than we did. Ha!" Rumors of a second episode being taped but never aired appear to be untrue, as Carroll stated that she and the other panelists were ready to go on stage to tape the second episode but wound up instead being a backstage witness to the apology, causing her to wonder why she was even in the studio in the first place.

== Similar guessing games ==
The concept of a contestant putting his or her head through a hole in a portrait and trying to guess the picture was attempted again for a 2013 episode of the UK panel show Celebrity Juice. The Dutch television game show De Jongens tegen de Meisjes also includes a challenge in which the celebrity candidates have to guess who they are by asking their team members yes–no questions about their identity. An identical game was occasionally played as one of the stunts on the original version of Shop 'til You Drop.
