= Dr. Abner Benton House =

Historic house in New York, United States

- U.S. National Register of Historic Places
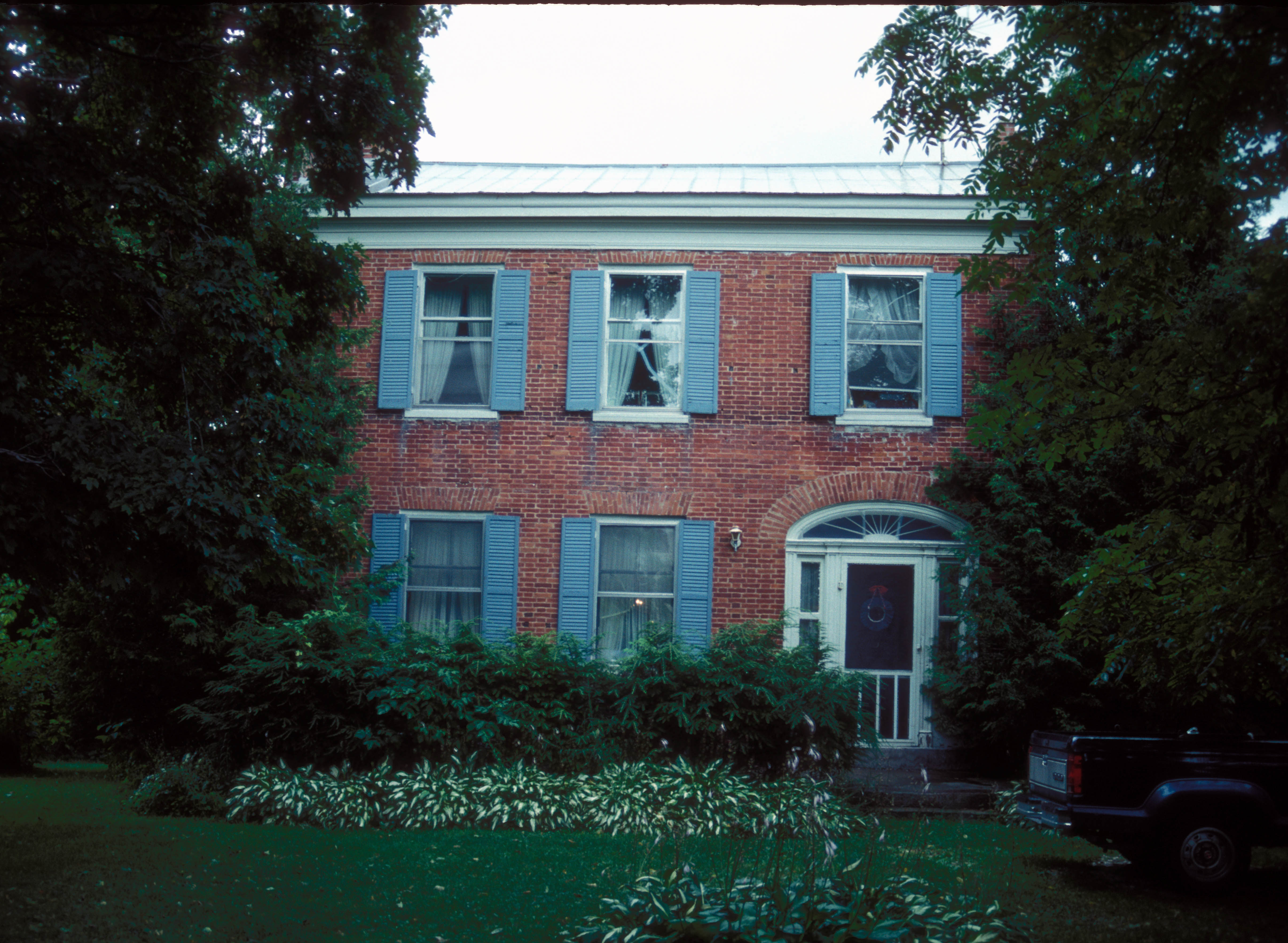

- Location within New York Location within the United States
- Location: Main St., Oxbow, New York
- Coordinates: 44°17′20″N 75°37′36″W
- Area: 5.6 acres (2.3 ha)
- Built: 1819
- Architectural style: Federal
- NRHP reference No.: 84002405
- Added to NRHP: August 23, 1984

The Dr. Abner Benton House is a historic house located in Oxbow, Jefferson County, New York.

== Description and history ==
It was built in 1819, and is a two-story, three-bay wide, brick Federal-style residence. The interior features a side hallway plan, two rooms deep.

It was listed on the National Register of Historic Places on August 23, 1984.
