= Young Sook Park =

South Korean ceramic artist (born 1947)

Park Young-sook (Korean: 박영숙, born 1947), known professionally as Young Sook Park or YSP, is a Korean ceramic artist known for her large, porcelain moon jars (a vessel popular in the late Joseon era). Park's contemporary interpretation of the moon jar melds traditional artisan traditions with her unique aesthetic sensibilities of color, form, and proportion. Her minimalist aesthetic and translation of porcelain has contributed to the expansion of meaning, importance, and popularity of contemporary Korean ceramics on a global scale.

== Biography ==
Park was born in Gyeongju, Korea, an area rich with Joseon history and culture. Growing up, Park enjoyed visiting antique shops to collect things and curate little displays. She was praised for having a good aesthetic eyes at a young age. Park did not receive a traditional art school training. In adulthood, she married a gallery owner and, in her early 30s, began ceramics as a hobby. She started taking more serious classes as her children grew and went to school. Her talent was recognized and she was motivated by her teachers to continue. She quickly met with success at her gallery shows. She went to Japan to study color and form. Her mentors encouraged her to work with porcelain despite its challenging aspects. Artist Lee Ufan challenged her to gain skills by making a tea set and dinner set in porcelain to hone her skills. In 1979, she founded the Park Young Sook Ceramic Studio in Gyeonggi Province.

== Work ==
Early in her practice, she practiced making tea and dinner sets to hone her technique. To this day, she still makes tea sets and dinnerware, sometimes on a monumental scale. Once she perfected those forms, she immersed herself in learning how to make a moon jar. She experimented with proportion by increasing the height while making the walls thinner. Her experiments and trials led her to the monumental vases she is known for today.

=== Technique ===
Through years of trial and error, Park has honed her process of making moon jars from its beginning stages as clay to a finished piece. Her clay blend is mined from various parts of Korea and takes 6–10 years to gestate to the ideal viscosity needed for retaining structural integrity without the use of synthetic materials. The fermentation process, which Park does not disclose, is the reason she can create enlarged versions of traditional moon jars with traditional techniques. She aligns herself with Joseon tradition and only utilizes natural elements such as iron, copper, and cobalt to make blue, brown, and red respectively.

=== Collaborations ===
In the 1980s, Korean artist Lee Ufan visited Park's gallery and was inspired by her porcelain pieces. Under Lee's mentorship, Park began a long artistic relationship. They experimented with aesthetics and blending painting with ceramics. Lee used minimalistic, calligraphic brushstrokes in cobalt blue to decorate Park's ceramic forms. The result expresses a mediation between form, shape and color.

Korean artist Yee Soo-kyung used the broken shards of Park's imperfect moon vases and reassembled them into a sculpture that looks like the moon. The fragments of Park's vases would have otherwise been discarded. Yee's Translated Vase series shows how uniting broken pieces can be 'translated' into a whole new art form.

== Selected recognitions ==
In 1999, Queen Elizabeth II visited Park's atelier in Insa-dong, Seoul.
