= Payne Lake (New York) =

Lake in New York, United States

- Location within New York Location within the United States
- Location: Jefferson County, New York, United States
- Coordinates: 44°17′00″N 075°38′44″W
- Primary outflows: Oswegatchie River
- Basin countries: United States
- Surface area: 154 acres (0.62 km^{2})
- Average depth: 7 feet (2.1 m)
- Max. depth: 60 feet (18 m)
- Shore length^{1}: 2.8 miles (4.5 km)
- Surface elevation: 344 feet (105 m)
- Islands: 1
- Settlements: Oxbow, New York
- ^{1} Shore length is not a well-defined measure.

Payne Lake is located by Oxbow, New York. The outlet creek empties into the Oswegatchie River. Fish species present in the lake are largemouth bass, smallmouth bass, northern pike, walleye, yellow perch, tiger muskie, bluegill, and black crappie. There is a state owned hard surface ramp located west of Oxbow, New York and there is a 10-horsepower limit.
