= Helen Hinsdale Rich =

American poet (1827–1915)

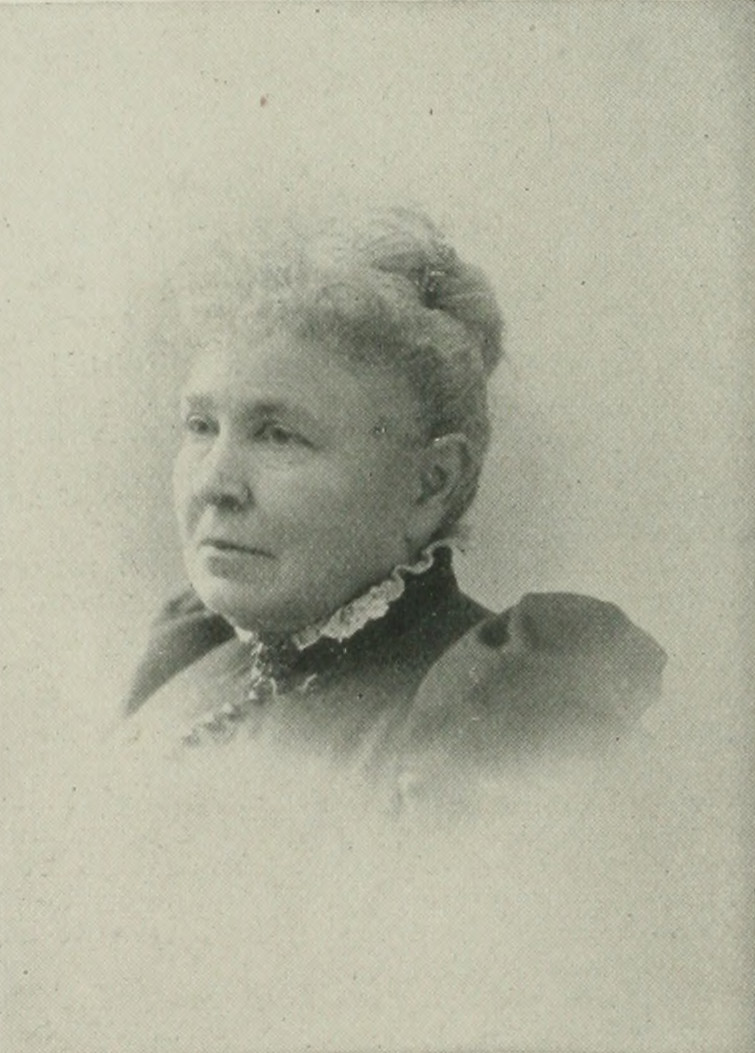
- Photo in A Woman of the Century
- Born: Helen Hinsdale; June 18, 1827; Antwerp, New York, U.S.
- Died: September 4, 1915 (aged 88); Buchanan County, Missouri, U.S.
- Occupation: poet
- Spouse: Moses Rich (m. 1847)

Helen Hinsdale Rich (née, Hinsdale; June 18, 1827 - September 4, 1915), known as "The Poet of the Adirondacks", was a 19th-century American writer of poetry. She wrote and lectured in the causes of temperance and women's rights. She was the first woman of northern New York to embrace woman suffrage. Her poetry appeared in the Springfield Republican, Boston Transcript, the Overland Monthly, and other prominent journals. Her volume of poems, A Dream of the Adirondacks, and Other Poems (New York City, 1884), was compiled by Charles G. Whiting. Her Madame de Stael had the endorsement of eminent scholars as a literary lecture. Her "Grand Armies" was considered a brilliant Memorial Day address. She excelled in poems of affection. Her "Justice in Leadville", in the style of Bret Harte, was pronounced by The Spectator to be worthy of that poet or of John Hay. \

== Early life and education ==
Helen Hinsdale was born June 18, 1827, in Antwerp, New York. Her father, Ira Hinsdale, was a pioneer farmer who had migrated from Berkshire County, Massachusetts. On her father's side she was a relative of Emma Willard. She was born in a log cabin on the farm he cleared in 1821. Her mother died in 1879.

She ran away to school at the age of four. At 12 years of age, she wrote verses. Though she attended only a single term, she led her classes in the Gouverneur Wesleyan Seminary, and won prizes in composition. She became proficient in botany at the age of 13 in the woods on the farm. She was obliged to read all debates of the United States Congress aloud to her father, and the speeches of Henry Clay and Daniel Webster made her an ardent patriot and politician. She was a Universalist.

== Career ==
She married Moses Rich, July 4, 1847. He was a manufacturer from Brasher Falls, New York. She found time to write several hundred poems and a vast amount of prose, including stories, lectures, and addresses. Most of her studying was done in spite of engrossing home cares since marriage. She was with Professor J. S. Lee, of Canton, New York, for several months in her 37th year.

Her poems had a wide circulation in the periodical press; but her chief productions, poems of great length, were never published. Rich was a contributor to the Rose of Sharon, Lily of the Valley, Ladies' Repository, Overland Monthly, New York Tribune, Chicago Tribune, Detroit Tribune, New Covenant, Star in the West, Springfield Republican, Burlington Hawkeye, Boston Transcript, Boston Commonwealth, Woman's Journal, Universalist, Christian Leader, and many other periodical publications.

Rich was a temperance worker, and her lectures upon that subject were characterized as persuasive and of high literary merit. For two seasons, she gave lectures for the Union cause in the American Civil War. She was a defender of woman's right to assist in making the laws that govern her. She carried out her ideas of woman's ability and need of personal achievement, self-support and self-reliance in the rearing of her daughter.

== Personal life ==
Rich made her home is in Chicago, Illinois. She had one daughter, Mrs. D. C. Lyon, of St. Joseph, Missouri, a musician; and a son, Pitt C. Rich, of Chicago. She died September 4, 1915, in Buchanan County, Missouri.

== Style and themes ==
Rich's verse was characterized as "fluent and graceful, and she expresses emotion with that impress of genuineness and honesty which carries a personal force into the verse. She is deeply engaged in moral motives, and these fill many of her best poems with an inspiring fervor. But she also has the feeling of pure beauty". Her work as an interpreter of nature and humanity was compared to Lucy Larcom and Julia C. R. Dorr.

== Selected works ==
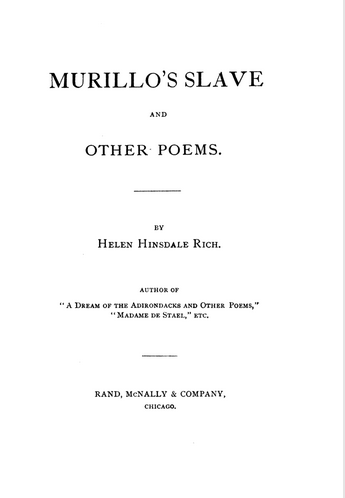
Murillo's Slave and Other Poems

- A dream of the Adirondacks, and other poems, 1884
- Madame de Staël, the rival of Napoleon, 1895
- Baron Maurice Hirsch, 1897
- Murillo's slave; and other poems, 1897
