= Photo stand-in =

Large board with a face-sized hole used for humorous effect

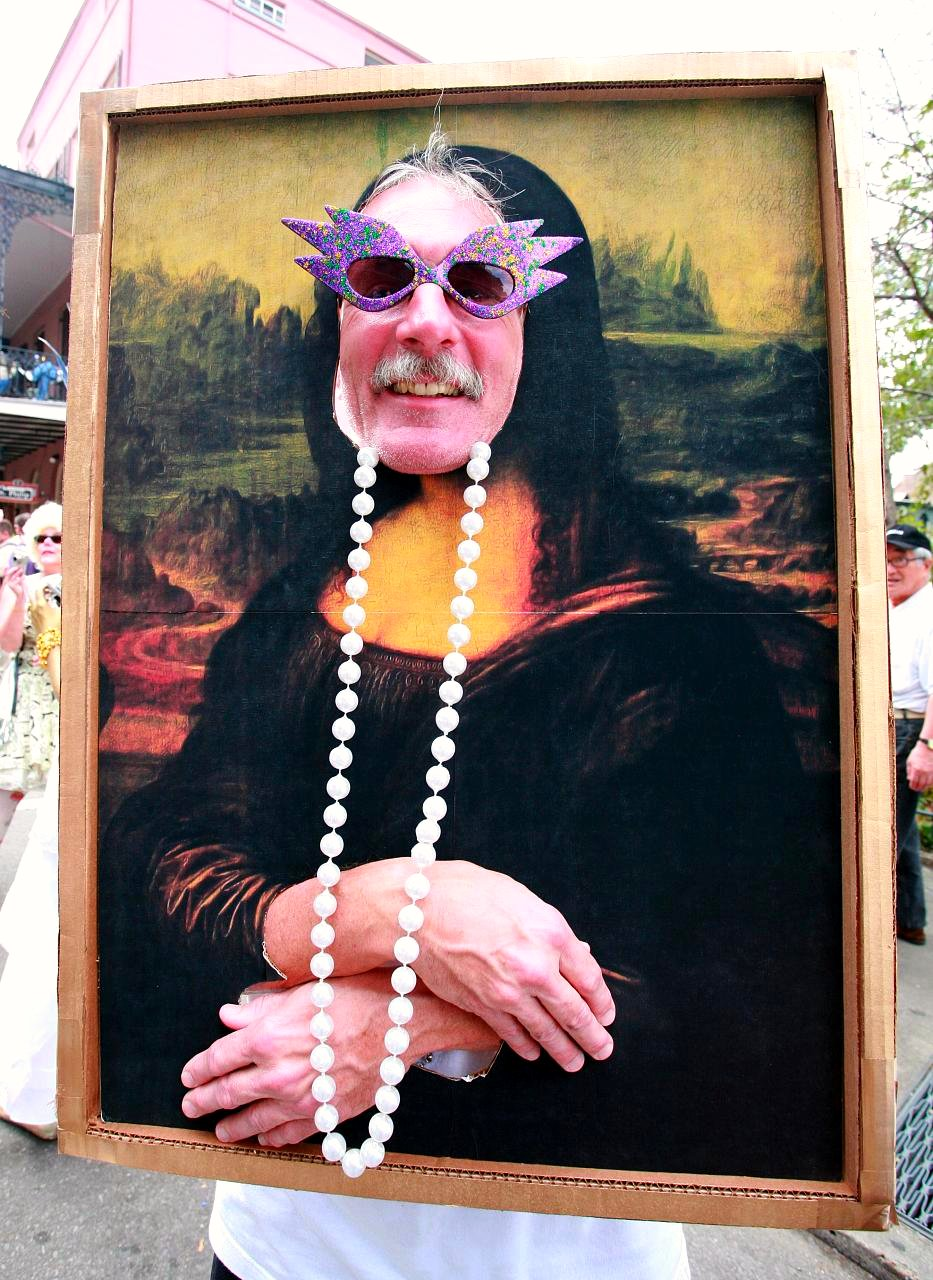
A man takes the place of Lisa del Giocondo in the Mona Lisa using a photo stand-in

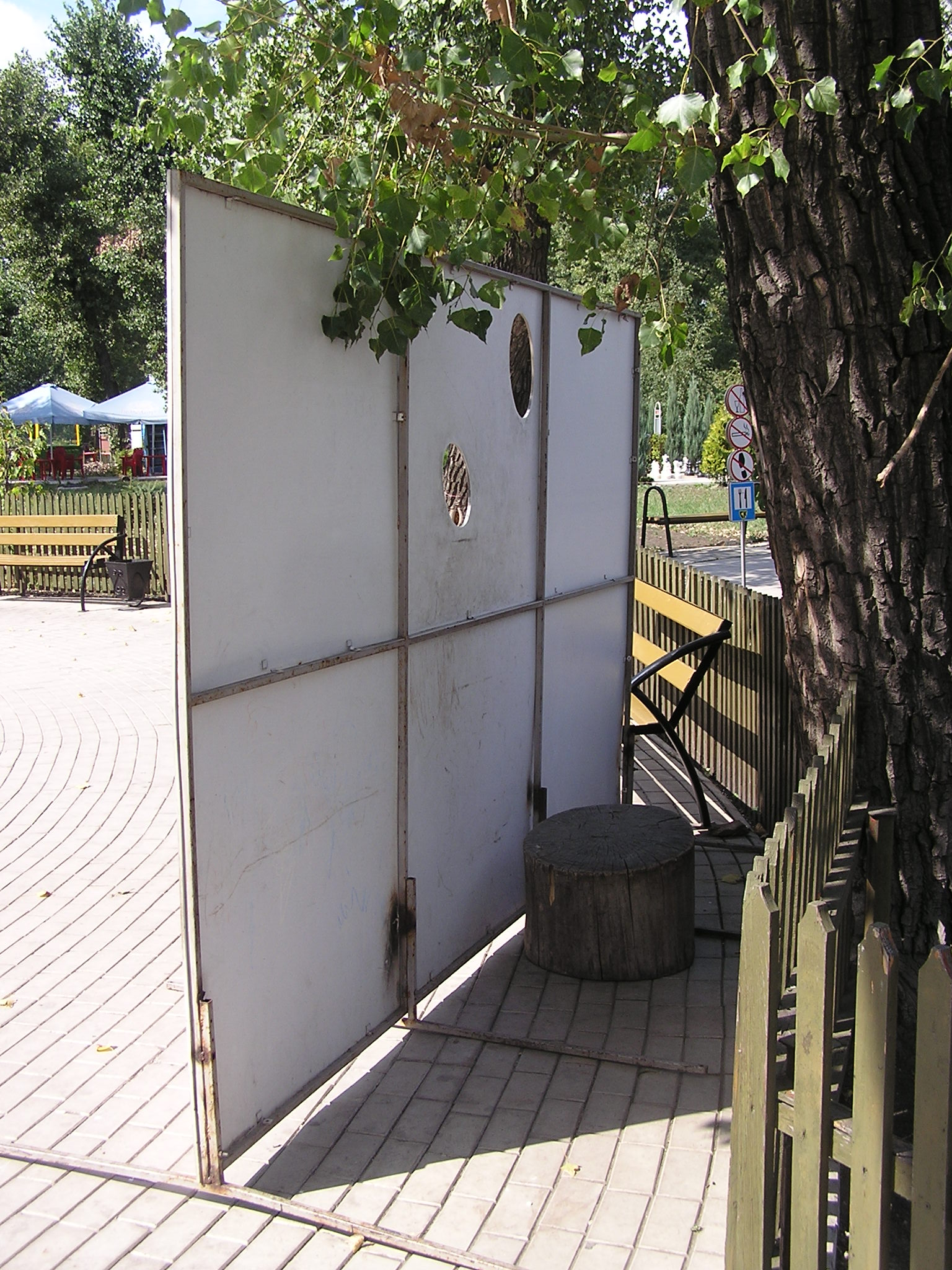
The back of a photo stand-in

A photo stand-in (also called a face-in-hole, face in the hole board, or photo cutout board, or originally called a comic foreground) is a large board with an image printed on it and that has one or more holes cut out where people can stick their face through the board for humorous effect. The hole aligns with an area in the image that creates an optical illusion of the person's face being an actual part of the scene. This illusion is then often immortalized by taking a photograph of the person's face through the board. Photo stand-ins may be found at midways, carnivals, parties, tourist traps, theme parks and similar locations and events that people visit for entertainment. The television game show You're in the Picture revolved around celebrity guests using a photo stand-in, having to guess what scene they were in. The Dutch game show De Jongens tegen de Meisjes had a segment with a similar game from the second season onwards.

Coolidge's patent

The use of an image on a board that could be held up as a foreground below the chin was patented by Cassius Marcellus Coolidge in 1874. The photo stand-in as it is widely known today predates this version, which Coolidge acknowledges in his patent. His patent and successful marketing of both versions did however lead to him often being credited as the inventor.

The earliest inspiration might be tourist attractions in 19th century Egypt, where a face hole was cut out of a sarcophagus and a sphinx statue (probably plaster reproductions) so that a photo could be taken where the tourist pretends to be a mummy or sphinx. One such surviving photo is of Archduke Franz Ferdinand of Austria, posing as a mummy while in Cairo, 1894. Another is of James Deering and Abby Deering Howe, posing as a mummy and a sphinx, taken in the 1870s by the photographers Pascal Sebah and Émile Béchard, who were based in Cairo.

== See also ==
- Optical illusion
- Standee
- Carnival
