= Oxbow, New York =

- Census-designated place
- Location within New York Location within the United States
- Coordinates: 44°17′14″N 75°37′24″W
- Country: United States
- State: New York
- County: Jefferson
- Town: Antwerp

Area
  - Total: 0.42 sq mi (1.08 km^{2})
  - Land: 0.41 sq mi (1.05 km^{2})
  - Water: 0.012 sq mi (0.03 km^{2})
- Elevation: 351 ft (107 m)

Population (2020)
  - Total: 85
  - Density: 211/sq mi (81.3/km^{2})
- Time zone: UTC-5 (Eastern (EST))
  - Summer (DST): UTC-4 (EDT)
- ZIP Codes: 13608 (Antwerp); 13691 (Theresa)
- Area code: 315
- FIPS code: 36-55937
- GNIS feature ID: 0959708

Oxbow is a hamlet and census-designated place (CDP) in the town of Antwerp, Jefferson County, New York, United States. As of the 2020 census, Oxbow had a population of 85.

== History ==
It was founded in 1817 by Abraham Cooper, an ancestor of Ambassador Charles W. Yost. Located at Oxbow is the Dr. Abner Benton House (1819), listed on the National Register of Historic Places in 1984.

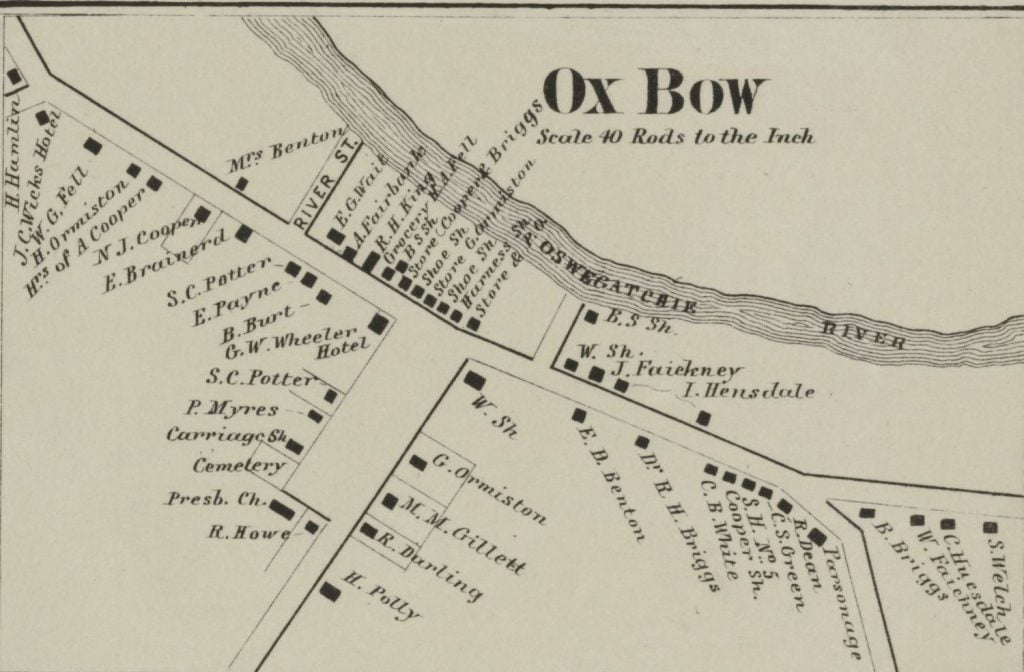
A map of Ox Bow (Oxbow), made in 1864. At this time Oxbow's population was much higher than today, likely around 300 residents.

== Geography ==
Oxbow is in northern Jefferson County, in the northern part of the town of Antwerp. It sits at the south end of a sharp bend in the Oswegatchie River at an altitude of 351 feet (107 m). According to the United States Census Bureau, the CDP has a total area of 0.20 square miles (0.52 km^{2}), all land.

Oxbow is 29 miles (47 km) northeast of Watertown, the Jefferson county seat, and 9 miles (14 km) southwest of Gouverneur.

== Demographics ==
Historical population
Census	Pop.	Note	%±
2020	85		—
U.S. Decennial Census

== Education ==
The school district is the Indian River Central School District.
