= Yeesookyung =

South Korean multi-disciplinary artist

Yeesookyung (Korean: 이수경, born 1963) is a South Korean multi-disciplinary artist and sculptor best known for her Translated Vase series which utilizes the broken fragments of discarded Korean ceramics to form new sculptures. Her other works in installation and drawings explore dynamics of feminism and feminine experience, psycho-spiritual introspection, cultural deconstruction, as well as Korean traditional arts and history melded with contemporary aesthetics.

== Education ==
Yeesookyung was born in Seoul, Korea in 1963. She attended Seoul National University in 1989 and received her BFA and MFA in Western painting. Her early work from the 1990s mainly consisted of large installations, video/sound works, and performance art. She was part of a generational wave of young Korean artists who tried to tackle ideas of identity in the face of historical political oppression and restricted creative expression. Her early works and the works of other artistic peers were considered part of the post--Minjung art movement, which focused on critiquing the political and social environment of South Korean society in the 1980s. Yeesookyung was interested in the role of the artist to disturb or disrupt the performative powers of the ruling state over the individuals of a society. Yeesookyung works with contradiction, duality and renewed life in her artistic practice. She views religions as an expression of human desire. Her artistic works are influenced by several religious backgrounds includes both Buddhism and Catholicsim. Personal narrative, spirituality, and references from popular culture are continuous themes within her art.

== Artistic biography ==
In 2001, she was a participant in the Albisola Biennale in Italy. She was interested in the ceramic culture of Italy due to the historical accounts of ceramics made by artists like Pablo Picasso and Lucio Fontana .The Biennale connected local Italian artisans with international guest artists to create collaborations for the exhibition. During that time, Yeesookyung was introduced to a local potter named Anna Maria. (run-on sentence error; divided up the sentence) During their meetings Yeesookyung showed her a poem about Joseon Baekja by Kim Sang-ok called “Ode to Porcelain.” written in 1947. Anna Maria had no prior knowledge of Joseon pottery and therefore used her imagination to create 12 white porcelain pieces in the style of 18th-century Joseon vessels. The collaboration, titled Translated Vase Albisola, was the Initial sculptural collaboration which inspired the larger "Translated Vase" Series which would continue to incorporate acts of translation and cross-cultural exchange.

Yeesookyung celebrates discarded ceramic pieces, deemed unworthy and grants them a new life, reassembling them into new forms. She sees potential in things that are discarded and utilizes broken ceramics in her sculptural works. The "Translated Vase" Series simultaneously inverts a Japanese practice of Kintsugi but also pays homage to psychic wounds through the Korean shamanistic practices that use discarded objects as tools of spiritual recollection and redemption. Each Translated Vase uses discarded pieces making the natural adaptation of material use a collaboration between Yee Sookyung and another artist. In 2012, she used the ceramic pieces from a moon jar created by Young Sook Park who is widely known for her mastery of moon jars. Yeesookyung made a sculpture that visualized the circular form of a moon, again subverting historical narratives through her artistic practice.

Yeesookyung's practice expanded towards drawing works, in 2004 she created her Daily Drawing series, the series was a way for record her thoughts and feelings during a tumultuous time in her life. Through these drawings, she explored how to confront and heal psychological wounds through art. In Yeesookyung's larger creative process, she attempts to consider both pain and pleasure in her works. She is continuously contemplating the restrains and blessings of the human experience. The drawing series embraces suffering and hardship as a way to reach transcendence. This mindset of embracing and reviving memories through wounds is also present within the Translated Vase series.

In 2005, Yeesookyung made a series of 12 drawings titled Breeding Drawing (2005). Each piece was created using cinnabar, a red mineral pigment used to make talismans and Buddhist paintings. The paintings conjured the story of Princess Bari, who was cast away by the King, since her mother, the queen, only gave birth to daughters. Her pieces featured the delicate line drawings of the female body holding white vases. The drawing first began with one woman and then through a repetitious process of filling up the paper in a symmetrical manner, she finished the drawing with a proliferation of female figures and white vases decorated with blue patterns. Bari eventually saves the King and Queen from a fatal illness by finding a magic elixir in the realm of the dead. Princess Bari is seen as the mother of Korean shamans. Like Buddhist monks, when Yeesookyung draws, she breaks down boundaries in the external world to practice transcendence.

In the artist's Flame series (2008-ongoing), she uses drawing to explore bodily expression on a flat plane. Thin lines that unfurl over the page index the body in motion and also the rhizomatic nature of an idea. Her drawing practice is sort of religious act that offers her a meditative space and the images she creates evoke Buddhist paintings of the cosmos. The ancient style of her drawings is inspired by Goguryeo cave paintings. The undulating forms within her Flame series seem to have no start or end, thus communicating the idea that the self is always inextricably tied with all parts of space and the universe. The Very Best Statue series is Yeesookyung's ongoing project she started in 2008. This project had a participatory element where local residents of Echigo Tsumari, Japan and Anyang, Korea were given a survey to choose which body parts of Confucius, Lao Tzu, Mary, Jesus, Buddha, Mohammed, and Ganesh would be best for a sculpture. These religious founder's body parts were “sacrificed” and shed their unique corporeal formations to become the ultimate “other.” These figures were also chosen since they dedicated their lives to helping people transcend from the self into the “true” universal self, where no distinctions can be made. This democratic process of using surveys also erases the hand and will of the artist, further breaking down Yee's sense of self. It is telling that body parts of Jesus and Buddha are among the most frequently used in her Very Best Statue series.

In 2012, her solo exhibition, Constellation Gemini, Yeesookyung presented a series of drawing, installation, and sculpture works that were bilaterally symmetrical. While listening to Gregorian chants she had an epiphany about symmetry. She also featured a 12-sided pedestal which exhibited thousands of Translated Vases and solo fragments. This huge presentation of various ceramic pieces represented infinite plethora and the array of both single fragments and finished pieces highlight a shift in her thinking. Ceramic shards, presented on their own, show the artist's acceptance of the discarded object as inherently complete in itself (instead of needing to be unified). As aforementioned, the symmetry in all the other works presented in the exhibition show how mirror images are always a contestation of self and other, single and multiple, same but different. Her work sought to unify the space between self and other.

Yeesookyung’s Past Life Regression Painting (2014-ongoing) is another ongoing series that considers ideas of the self and the different forms of spirituality. During the making of these paintings, Yeesookyung uses the help of a professional hypnotherapist to visualize past life regressions. The visual works are thematically charged and signal to consistent narrative around the Buddha, Catholicism, Enlightenment and natural symbolism. For example, in "Several of the Past Life Regression Painting," there are illustrations of Caucasian hunters or a tiger going after the small deer. Later works from this series are titled "Oh, Rose! (2022–ongoing) shown at Hysteria: Contemporary Realism at the ILMIN Museum of Art (Seoul, Korea) is a continuation of the Past Life Regression Paintings which visualizes Yeesookyung's past life regression in a series of large acrylic paintings. The works came into fruition under hypnosis; while Yeesookyung was guided by a professional hypnotherapist, she examined the material and karmic messaging of her past lives. Her subconscious was adorned with roses along the pathways of her previous lives. The series attempts at finding new pathways and understanding of herself and her arts future narratives, informed by past lives and karmic experiences.

The “Moonlight Crown” series (2018-ongoing) is a culmination of multiple practices and mediums that Yeesookyung has previously worked in. The large ceramic-like objects have an overtly metaphorical quality. The inspiration of crowns in her work comes from her interest in the crown as a placeholder for a halo, how the crown is a misguided attempt at power or glory. Her “crowns” in the “Moonlight Crown’ series are un-wearable in consideration to their weight and size. The crowns are covered in metal ornaments, mirrors, glass and crystals. The decorative objects follow the same narratives and imagery that appear in her ‘Daily Drawing’ and ‘Flame’ series. This work recenters the duality of hope and despair and the multiplicity of femininity that Yeesookyung has addressed in previous works.

== Technique ==
In all artistic processes Yeesookyung is interested in the personal journey of transcendence and personal understanding. There are often social/cultural opportunities for exchange between her and other artists as well as her work and the identity of the viewer. Yeesookyung in her best known "Translated Vase" series, creates artistic sculptural works made from fragmented ceramics. She reconfigures the fragments into larger coherent sculptures using epoxy and gold leaf. In connecting disparate pieces, she does not wish to heal or “fix” the objects, rather she wants to use gold to glorify the “fateful weakness of being.” While it may be interpreted by some viewers that her process resembles kintsugi, the Japanese art of repairing broken vessels with gold, the explanation is not so simple. She chose to use gold due to the Korean word for “gold” and “crack” being homonyms` Putting broken vases back together is seen as a taboo or unlucky in Korean culture so she chose to emphasize flaws that have been denied by Korean culture. Her choThe Breeding Drawing (2005) series was created using a red mineral pigment in which Yeesookyung would create one drawing then turn it upside down then copy it using a separate panel and adding symmetrical images to both sides of the original copied drawing. The final drawings of The Breeding Drawing series also features illustrations of painted moon jars, which cycles back to Yeesookyung's later work with fragments of broken moon jars in her "Translated Vase" series.

In Yeesookyung’s Past Life Regression Painting (2014-ongoing) and her "Oh, Rose!" series, she creates acrylic paintings on large canvas that are exhibited next to each other. The works have an airy and pink pastel color palette that continues the colorful and dreamy aesthetic visuals of the earlier Past Life Regression series also offers illustrations of painted moon jars, which cycles back to Yeesookyung's later work with fragments of broken moon jars in her "Translated Vase" series.

In Yeesookyung’s Past Life Regression Painting (2014-ongoing) and her "Oh, Rose!" series, she creates acrylic paintings on large canvas that are exhibited next to each other. The works have an airy and pink pastel color palette that continues the colorful and dreamy aesthetic visuals of the earlier Past Life Regression series.

== Exhibitions ==
Yeesookyung's work has been shown in several solo shows including Yeesookyung: Temple portatif at Musée Cernuschi, Paris, France (2023), Moonlight Crowns at Art Sonje Center, Seoul, Korea (2021), The Story of a Girl Named Long Journey at Buk-Seoul Museum of Art, Seoul, Korea (2021). Whisper Only to You at MDRE & Capodimonte Museum, Naples, Italy (2019) and When I Become You: Yeesookyung in Taipei at the Museum of Contemporary Art, Taipei, Taiwan (2015).

She was also invited to participate in several large group shows such as Monstrous Beauty, at the Metropolitan Museum of Art in New York (2025), the 57th Venice Biennale VIVA ARTE VIVA, Whispers on the Horizon: The Taipei Biennial 2025 at the Taipei Fine Arts Museum, Taipei, Taiwan (2025).

== Residencies ==
Grass Mountain Art Residency, Taipei, Taiwan, 2015

Transfer Korea-NRW, Germany, 2012

Gyeonggi Creation Center Pilot Program, 2009

SSamzie Studio Program, Seoul, Korea, 2007

Villa Arson Residency Program, Nice, France, 2003

International Studio Program, Apex Art CP., New York, 1998

Artist in Market Place, Bronx Museum, New York, 1995

== Public collections ==
Yee's works have been acquired in over 30 collections, including:

- Acrovista, Seoul, Korea
- ARCO Collection, IFEMA, Madrid, Spain
- Museum of Fine Arts, Boston, USA
- Bristol Museum, Bristol, UK
- The British Museum, London, UK
- Byucksan Corporation, Seoul, Korea
- Museo e Real Bosco di Capodimonte, Naples, Italy
- City of Echigo-Tsumari, Japan
- Fukuoka Asian Art Museum, Fukuoka, Japan
- Gyeonggido Museum of Art, Ansan, Korea
- Jeju Museum of Contemporary Art, Jeju, Korea
- Kumho Museum of Art, Seoul, Korea
- Leeum, Samsung Museum of Art, Seoul, Korea
- Los Angeles County Museum of Art (LACMA), Los Angeles, CA, USA
- Mystetskyi Arsenal, Kyiv, Ukraine
- M+ Museum, Hong Kong
- National Museum of Contemporary Art, Gwacheon, Korea
- Philadelphia Museum of Art, Philadelphia, USA
- POSCO Museum, Pohang, Korea
- Princeton University, New Jersey, USA
- Salama Bint Hamdan Al Nahyan Foundation, Abu Dhabi, UAE
- Seoul Museum of Art, Seoul, Korea
- Smart Museum of Art, The University of Chicago, Chicago, IL, USA
- Spencer Museum of Art, The University of Kansas, Lawrence, KS, USA
- Times Square, Seoul, Korea
- Uli Sigg Collection, Switzerland
- YU-UN Obayashi Collection, Tokyo, Japan

== Selected solo exhibitions ==
1992

Getting Married to Myself, Indeco Gallery, Seoul/ K Gallery, Tokyo, Japan

1996

Lee Sookyung, Artemesia Gallery, Chicago, Il, USA

1997

Domestic Tailor Shop, Kumho Museum of Art, Seoul, Korea

2002

Off-shoot Flower/ Painting/ Pottery, SSamzieSpace, Seoul, Korea

2004

Island Adventure, Alternative Space Pool, Seoul, Korea

2005

Breeding Drawing, Gallery SSamzie, Seoul, Korea

2006

Flame, One and J. Gallery, Seoul, Korea

2007

Earth Wind &Fire, Ilmin Museum of Art, Seoul, Korea

2008

Broken Whole, Michael Schultz Gallery, Berlin, Germany

Paradise Hormone, Mongin Art Center, Seoul, Korea

2009

Yeesookyung, Thomas Cohn Gallery, São Paulo, Brazil

Yeesookyung, Ota Fine Arts, Tokyo, Japan

Yee Sookyung im Schloß Oranienbaum, Museum Schloß Oranienbaum, Dessau, Germany

2010

Jung Marie's Jeongga, Yeesookyung's Devotion, Arko Art Center, Seoul, Korea

Broken Whole, Michael Schultz Gallery, Seoul, Korea

2011

Yeesookyung, Almine Rech Gallery, Brussels, Belgium

2012

Yeesookyung, Sindoh Art Gallery, Seoul, Korea

2013

Flame, Ota Fine Arts, Singapore, Singapore

2014

The Meaning of Time, Locks Gallery, Philadelphia, USA

Take Me Home Country Roads, Space Willing N Dealing, Seoul, Korea

2015

Yeesookyung: Contemporary Korean Sculpture, Asia Society Texas Center, Houston, USA

Saint Breeders, Atelier Hermès, Seoul, Korea

When I Become You, Daegu Art Museum, Daegu, Korea

When I Become You, Yeesookyung in Taipei, Museum of Contemporary Art Taipei, Taiwan

2019

Whisper Only to You, Museo e Real Bosco di Capodimonte, Naples, Italy

Whisper Only to You, MADRE · Museo d'arte Contemporanea Donnaregina, Naples, Italy

Fragments of Form-Carla Accardi, Yeesookyung, Massimo De Carlo, Hong Kong (two-person exhibition)

2020

I am not the only one but many, Massimo De Carlo, London, UK

Oh Rose!, Space Willing N Dealing, Seoul, Korea

2021

Gana Art Nineone, Seoul, Korea

Buk-Seoul Museum of Art, Seoul, Korea

Moonlight Crowns, Art Sonje Center, Seoul, Korea
