= Cassius Marcellus Coolidge =

American painter (1844–1934)

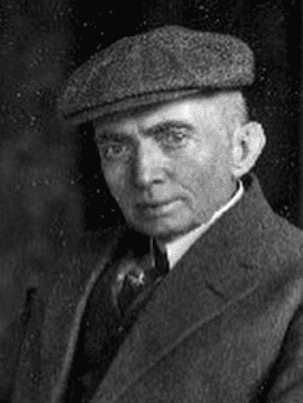
- Born: September 18, 1844; Antwerp, New York, United States
- Died: January 13, 1934 (aged 89); Staten Island, New York
- Known for: Illustration, painting
- Notable work: Dogs Playing Poker

Cassius Marcellus Coolidge (September 18, 1844 – January 13, 1934) was an American artist, mainly known for his series of portraits Dogs Playing Poker. Known as "Cash" or "Kash" in his family, he often signed his work in the 19th century with the latter spelling, sometimes spelling his name, for comic effect, as Kash Koolidge.

== Early life ==
Coolidge was born in Antwerp, New York to abolitionist Quaker farmers, and was raised in Philadelphia, New York.

He had little formal training as an artist.

== Career ==
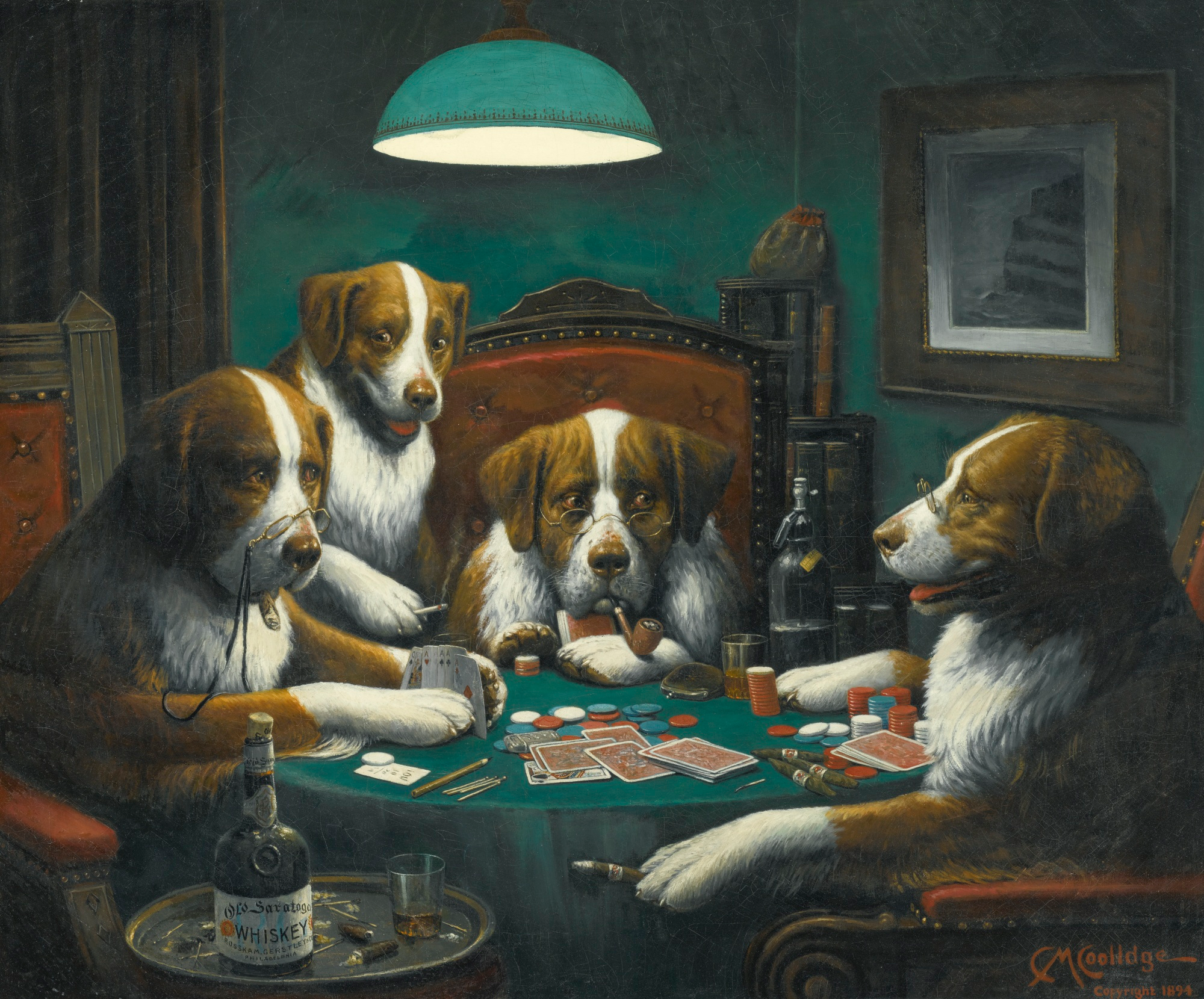
Poker Game, oil on canvas, 1894

After leaving the family farm in the early 1860s, Coolidge had many careers. Between 1868 and 1872 he worked as a druggist and sign painter, founded a bank and a newspaper, then moved from Antwerp, New York, to Rochester, where he started painting dogs in human situations.

=== Editorial work ===
Coolidge began his art career in his twenties, one of his early jobs being the artist of cartoons for a local newspaper.

=== Comic foregrounds ===
He is credited with creating "comic foregrounds," novelty photographs which combined a portrait of the sitter with a caricatured body, produced by the sitter holding between two sticks a canvas on which Coolidge drew or painted the caricature, which he patented. The final product was similar to the photographs produced using photo stand-ins at midways and carnivals where people place their heads into openings in life-size caricatures.

=== Calendar paintings ===
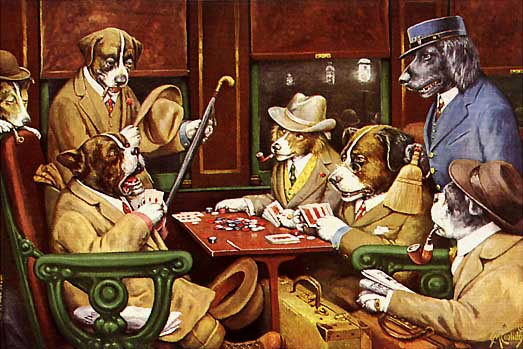
His Station and Four Aces by C. M. Coolidge, painted in 1903.

According to the advertising firm Brown & Bigelow, then primarily a producer of advertising calendars, Coolidge began his relationship with the firm in 1903. From the mid-1900s to the mid-1910s, Coolidge created a series of sixteen oil paintings for them, all of which featured anthropomorphic dogs, including nine paintings of Dogs Playing Poker, a motif that Coolidge is credited with inventing.

The series of 16 commissioned paintings and their themes are:

- A Bachelor's Dog – reading the mail
- A Bold Bluff – poker
- Breach of Promise Suit – testifying in court
- A Friend in Need – poker, cheating
- His Station and Four Aces – poker
- New Year's Eve in Dogville – ballroom dancing
- One to Tie Two to Win – baseball
- Pinched with Four Aces – poker, illegal gambling
- Poker Sympathy – poker
- Post Mortem – poker, camaraderie
- The Reunion – smoking and drinking, camaraderie
- Riding the Goat – Masonic initiation
- Sitting up with a Sick Friend – poker, gender relations
- Stranger in Camp – poker, camping
- Ten Miles to a Garage – travel, car trouble, teamwork
- Waterloo – poker

=== Other paintings ===
Additional paintings in a similar vein include:

- Kelly Pool (ca. 1909) – pool

Named for the then-common pool-game Kelly pool, Coolidge's painting of dogs playing pool may be considered a progenitor of another memetic pop-culture art genre, that of "dogs playing pool."

== Death ==
Coolidge died on January 13, 1934, in Staten Island, New York. He was buried at Hillside Cemetery in Antwerp, New York.

== Legacy ==
After the death of Coolidge, his dog paintings have been replicated in various comic forms.

== Auction records ==
On February 15, 2006, two Coolidge paintings, A Bold Bluff and Waterloo, which may have been the originals of the paintings used by Brown & Bigelow, went on the auction block at Doyle New York. Expected to fetch between $30,000 and $50,000, the pair sold for $590,400. The result surpassed the previous auction record of $74,000 for a Coolidge.

Coolidge's 1894 Poker Game realized $658,000 at a Sotheby's New York sale on November 18, 2015.

== Bibliography ==
- Davidson, Carla (February 1973). "A Man's Life". American Heritage. p. 56. ISSN 0002-8738.
- Fredrickson, Gardner (2006). Poker Dogs: The Life and Work of C. M. Coolidge. Writers' Collective. ISBN 978-1594110382.
