= Dogs Playing Poker =

Set of paintings by Cassius Marcellus Coolidge

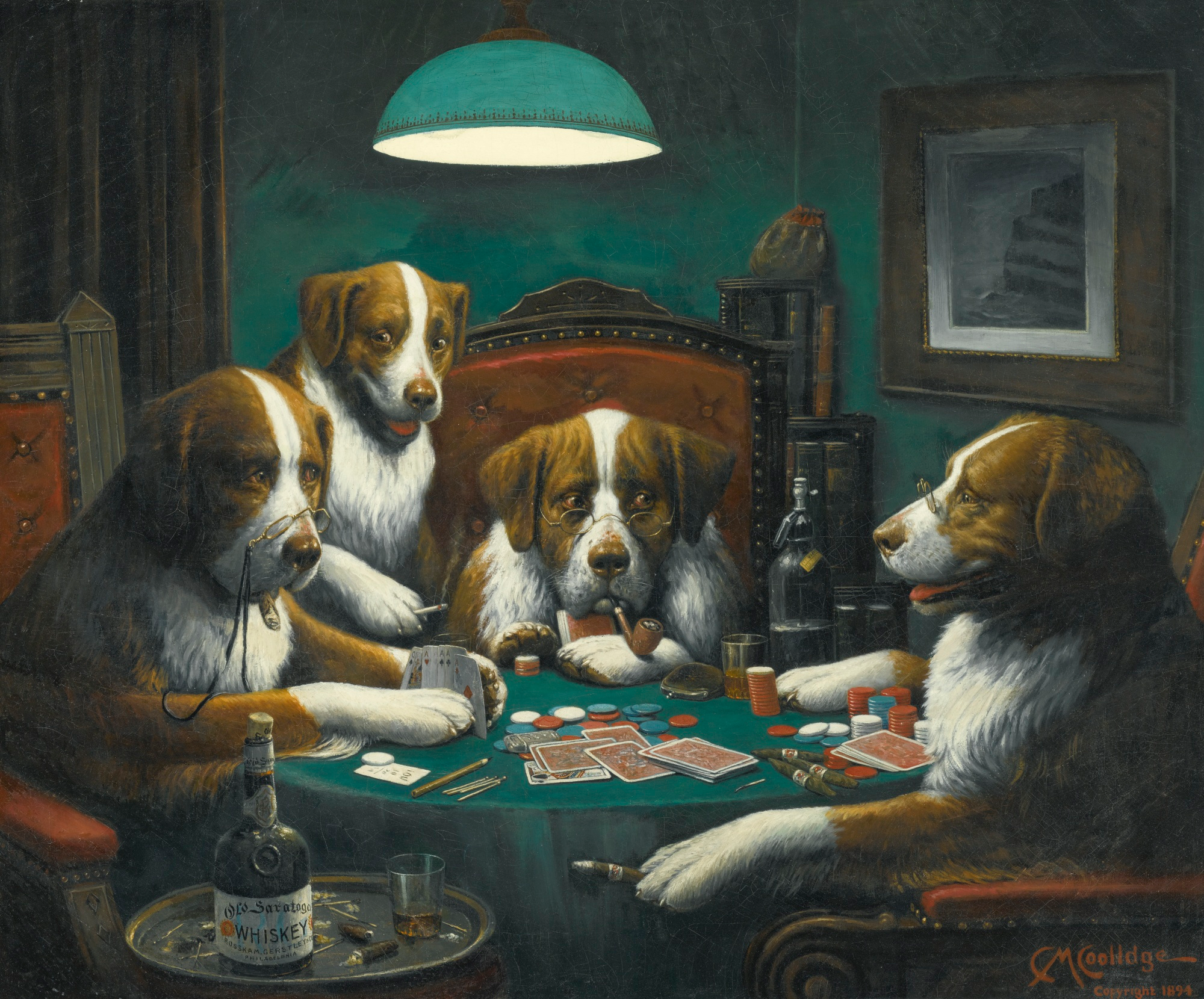
Poker Game, oil on canvas, 1894

Dogs Playing Poker is the informal name for a series of oil paintings by American artist Cassius Marcellus Coolidge created between 1894 and 1910. Most of the paintings depict dogs playing the card game poker, and a smaller number show dogs performing other human actions. The best known works are the 1903 series of sixteen oil paintings commissioned by Brown & Bigelow to advertise cigars. All eighteen paintings in the overall series feature anthropomorphized dogs, but the eleven in which dogs are seated around a card table have become well known in the United States as examples of kitsch art in home decoration.

Depictions and reenactments of the series have appeared in many films, television shows, theater productions, and other popular culture art forms. Critic Annette Ferrara has described Dogs Playing Poker as "indelibly burned into ... the American collective-schlock subconscious ... through incessant reproduction on all manner of pop ephemera".

The first painting, Coolidge's 1894 Poker Game, sold for $658,000 at a 2015 auction. As of 2026 it is part of the collection of the Lucas Museum of Narrative Art in Los Angeles.

== Description ==
The majority of the paintings ascribed to the Dogs Playing Poker moniker consist of anthropomorphized versions of dogs sitting around a poker table playing poker. The dogs presented are usually larger breeds like collies, Great Danes, St. Bernards, and general mastiffs. Humans do not appear in any of the paintings, and female dogs rarely appear. According to James McManus of The New York Times, the dogs are depicted as "upper-middle-class lawyers and businessmen", as they drink and smoke at the table. The dogs sit on leather chairs in dimly lit rooms, adorned by a ceiling lamp. Some of the paintings tell a story. For example, in the painting A Bold Bluff, a St. Bernard is holding a pair of deuces, and the other dogs are questioning whether to call his bluff. In the painting Waterloo, the same dogs did not call the St. Bernard's bluff, and he uses both paws to grab his winnings. Another painting in the series, titled A Friend in Need, depicts a bulldog slipping an ace under the table to the dog sitting next to him. Common themes throughout the Dogs Playing Poker series are deception, mistrust, and confrontation.

Not every painting within the series depicts dogs playing poker. Some paintings depict dogs performing other human activities, such as playing baseball, football and dancing. In the lithograph Riding the Goat, a collection of dogs initiates a St. Bernard into a fraternity while having him ride a goat while blindfolded.

== Coolidge paintings ==
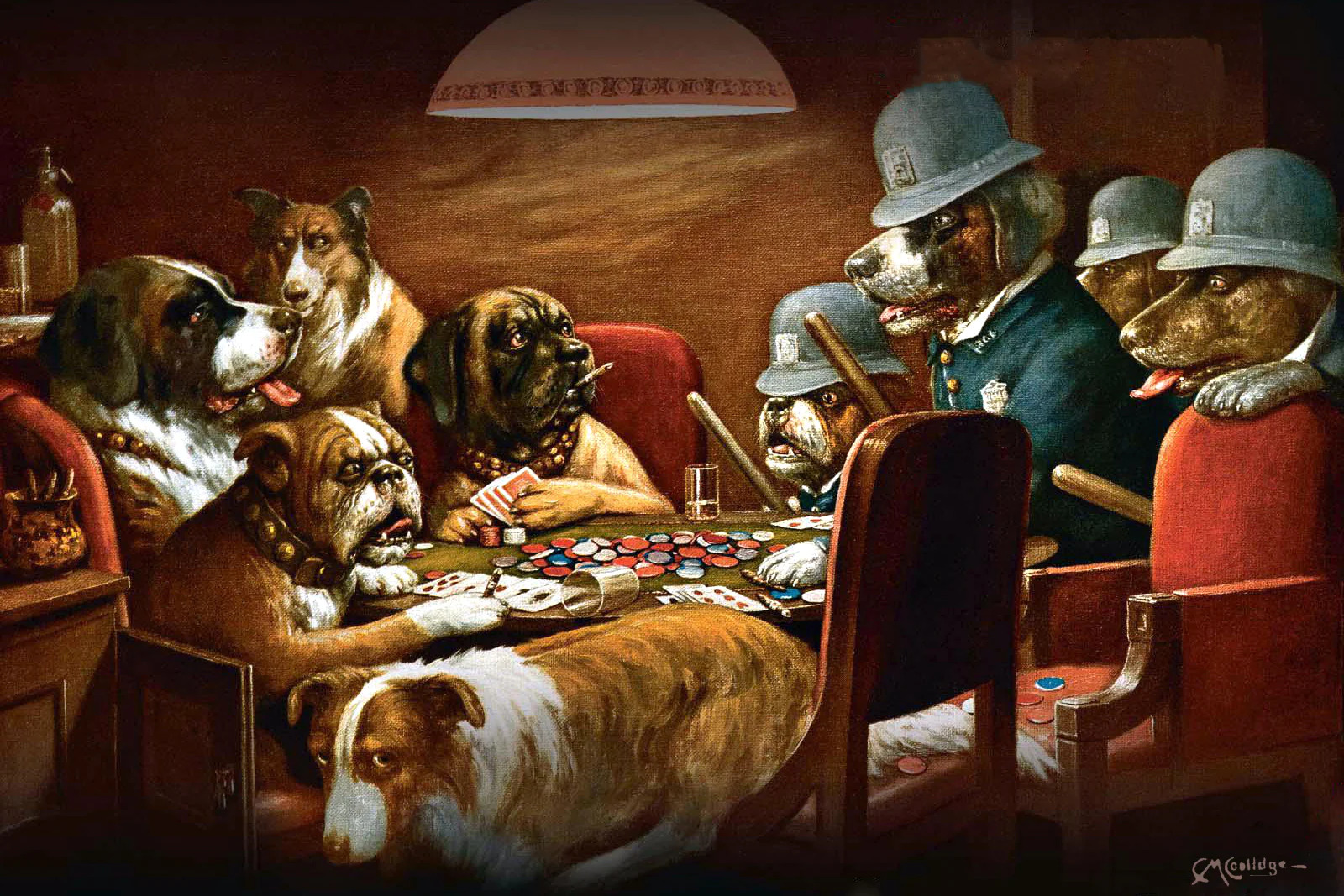
Pinched with Four Aces (1903)

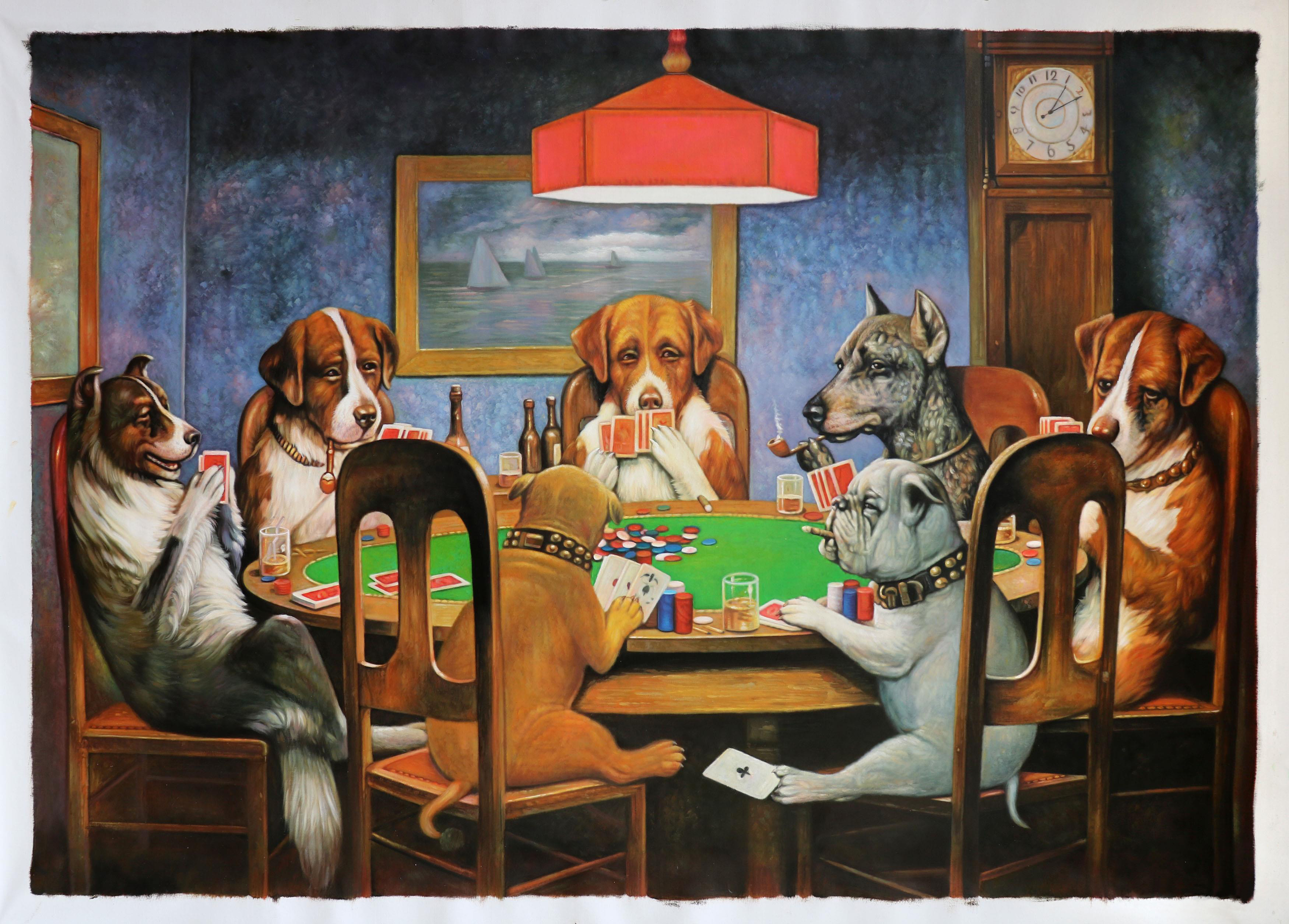
A Friend in Need (1903)

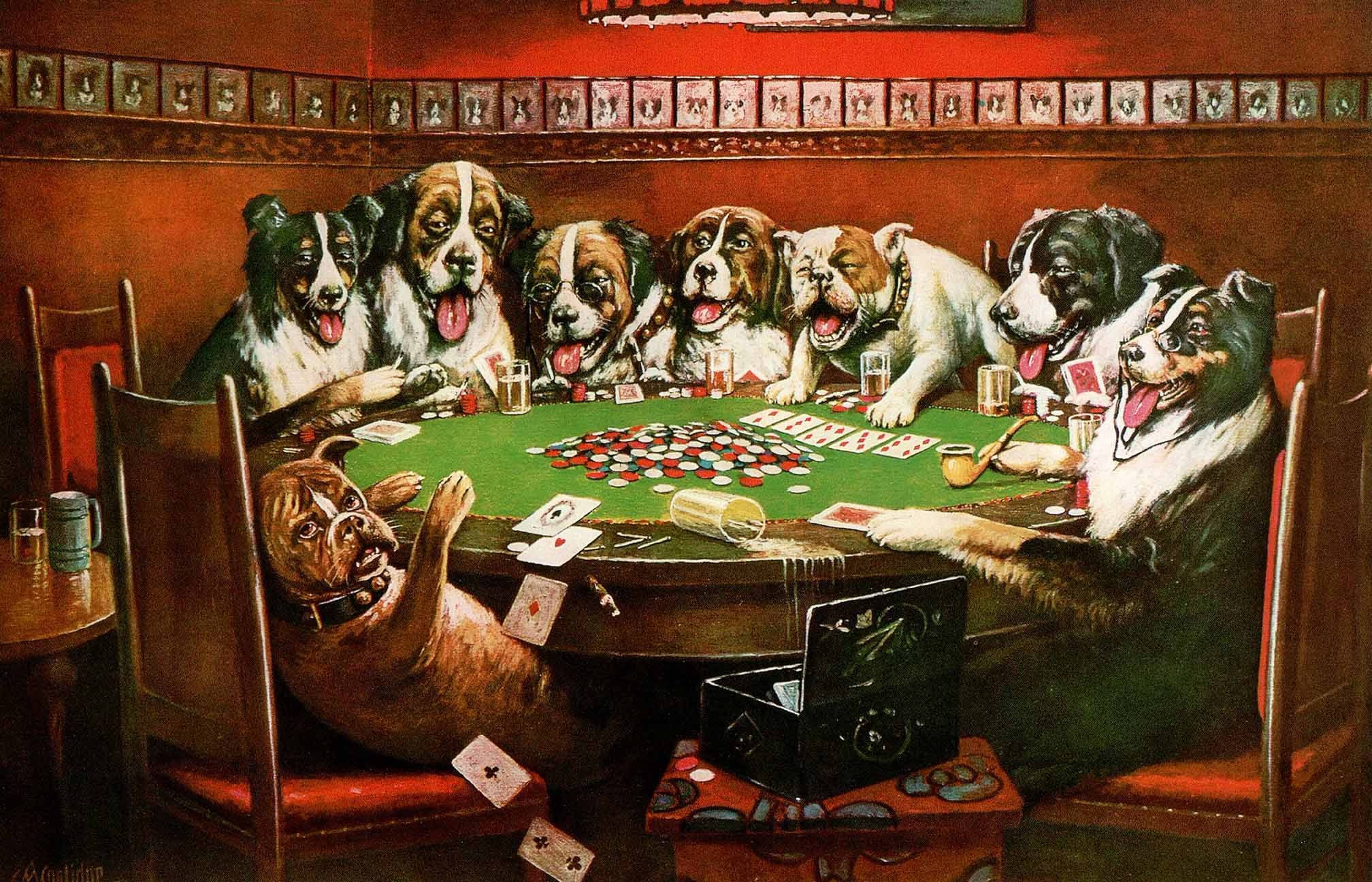
Poker Sympathy (1903)

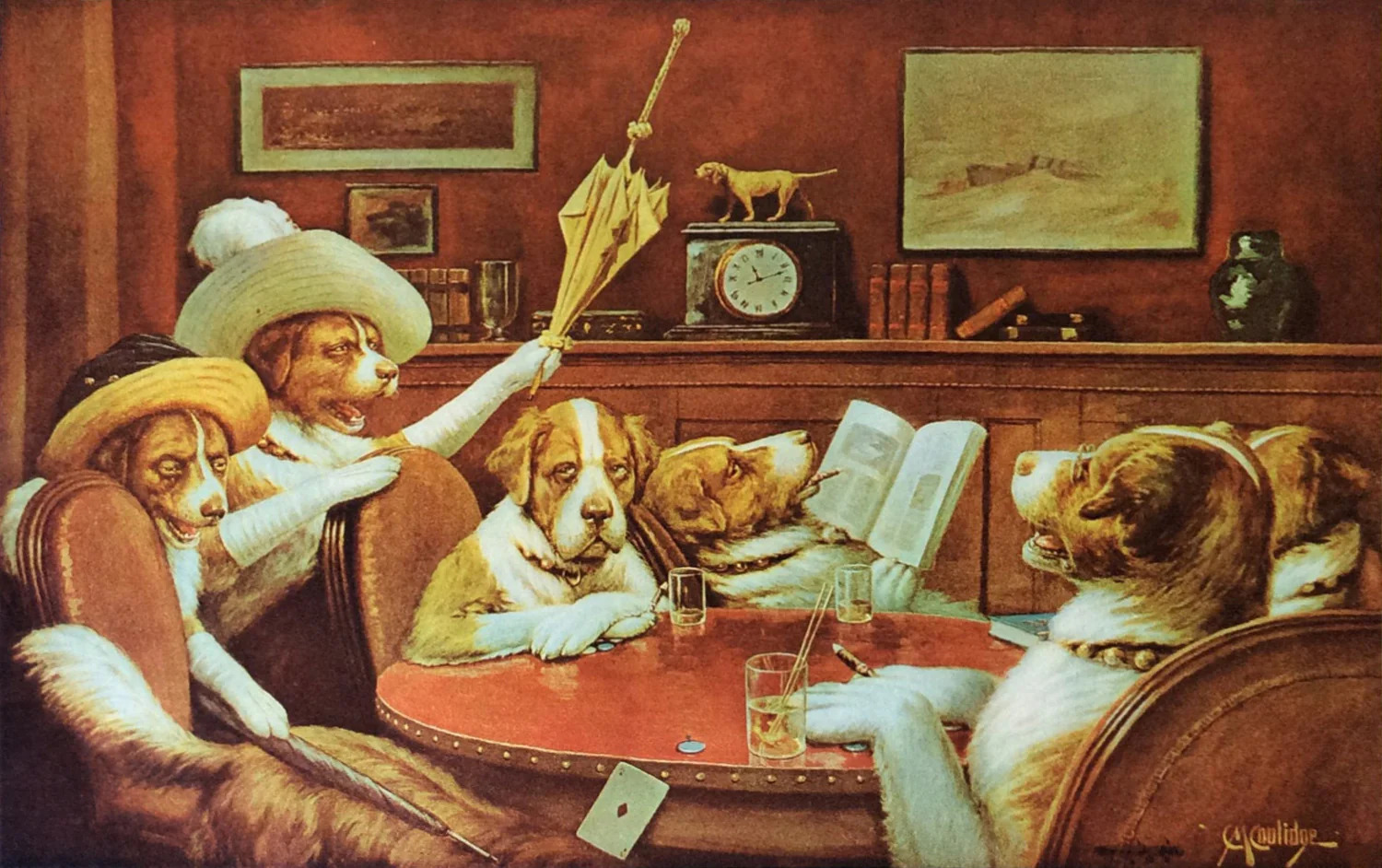
Sitting up with a Sick Friend (c. 1905)

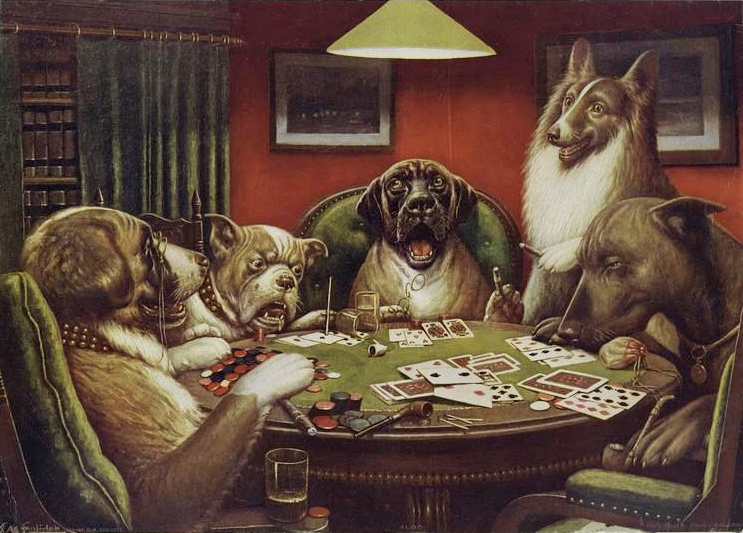
A Waterloo, 1906

The title of Coolidge's original 1894 painting is Poker Game.

The titles in the Brown & Bigelow series are:

- A Bachelor's Dog – reading the mail
- A Bold Bluff – poker (originally titled Judge St. Bernard Stands Pat on Nothing)
- Breach of Promise Suit – testifying in court
- A Friend in Need (1903) – poker, cheating
- Pinched with Four Aces (1903) – poker
- New Year's Eve in Dogville – ballroom dancing
- One to Tie Two to Win – baseball
- Pinched with Four Aces – poker, illegal gambling
- Poker Sympathy (1903) – poker
- Post Mortem – poker, camaraderie
- The Reunion – smoking and drinking, camaraderie
- Riding the Goat – Masonic initiation
- Sitting up with a Sick Friend (1905) – poker, gender relations
- Stranger in Camp – poker, camping
- Ten Miles to a Garage – travel, car trouble, teamwork
- A Waterloo (1906) – poker (originally titled Judge St. Bernard Wins on a Bluff)

These were followed in 1910 by a similar painting, Looks Like Four of a Kind. Other Coolidge paintings featuring anthropomorphized dogs include Kelly Pool, which shows dogs playing kelly pool.

Some of the compositions in the series are modeled on paintings of human card-players by such artists as Caravaggio, Georges de La Tour, and Paul Cézanne.

On February 15, 2005, the originals of A Bold Bluff and Waterloo were auctioned as a pair to an undisclosed buyer for US $590,400. The previous top price for a Coolidge was $74,000. In 2015, Poker Game sold for $658,000, currently the highest price paid for a Coolidge.

== In literature and the arts ==
The paintings remained fairly well-known into the 21st century, with various passing references in a number of works.

The animated television series The Simpsons has made several references to the paintings, such as in "Treehouse of Horror IV" (1993) when Homer becomes hysterical simply by observing the surrealness of the painting. The Jim Henson TV movie Dog City is a gangster puppet film inspired by the paintings. The TV sitcom Cheers used the paintings as a plot point in one episode. Passing references or short scenes involving the paintings occur in the 1998 season four episode "Sinking Ship" of the TV series NewsRadio, in an episode of White Collar, in the 2005 Suite Life of Zack and Cody episode "Hotel Inspector", in the 2006 Family Guy episode "Saving Private Brian", and the episode "Road to Rhode Island", in an episode of Courage the Cowardly Dog, in an episode of the TV series Boy Meets World, in the 1994 "School Daze" episode of Living Single, in a 2000 episode of the TV series That '70s Show, "Hunting", and in the 2020 Ray Donovan season seven episode "Passport and a Gun". In an episode of Animaniacs, a young Pablo Picasso's artistic frustration is demonstrated by his producing a Dogs Playing Poker painting. Dogs Playing Poker TV ads were aired during ESPN Sunday Night Football during the 1998 and 1999 NFL seasons.

In the 1999 film The Thomas Crown Affair, Banning believes she finds a stolen Claude Monet painting in Crown's house. On expert examination it turns out to be a fake painted over a copy of Poker Sympathy, a Dogs Playing Poker canvas, with Detective referring to it as Dogs at Cards. In the 2016 film, The Accountant, the paintings are discussed by the lead characters. Later, a copy of A Friend in Need is used as a cover to hide a Jackson Pollock painting. Glimpses, passing mentions, or short scenes involving the paintings are in the 1991 film Hudson Hawk, the 2009 film Up, the 2006 film Barnyard, and in the 2022 film Puss in Boots: The Last Wish.

In the 1984 play The Foreigner by Larry Shue, a character complains that she doesn't want to be in her motel room because there is a "Damn picture on the wall of some dogs playin' poker."

The cover of the 1981 album, Moving Pictures by Rush, features A Friend in Need as one of the three pictures being moved. The music video for Snoop Dogg's 1993 song, "What's My Name", depicts dogs playing craps while smoking cigars and wearing sunglasses.

In the Expeditionary Force science fiction series by Craig Alanson, the artificial intelligence Skippy owns the original painting of "A Friend in Need."

== See also ==
- William Wegman
- Laying Down the Law, 1840 painting
