= Henry Loomis (physician) =

American physician (1859–1907)

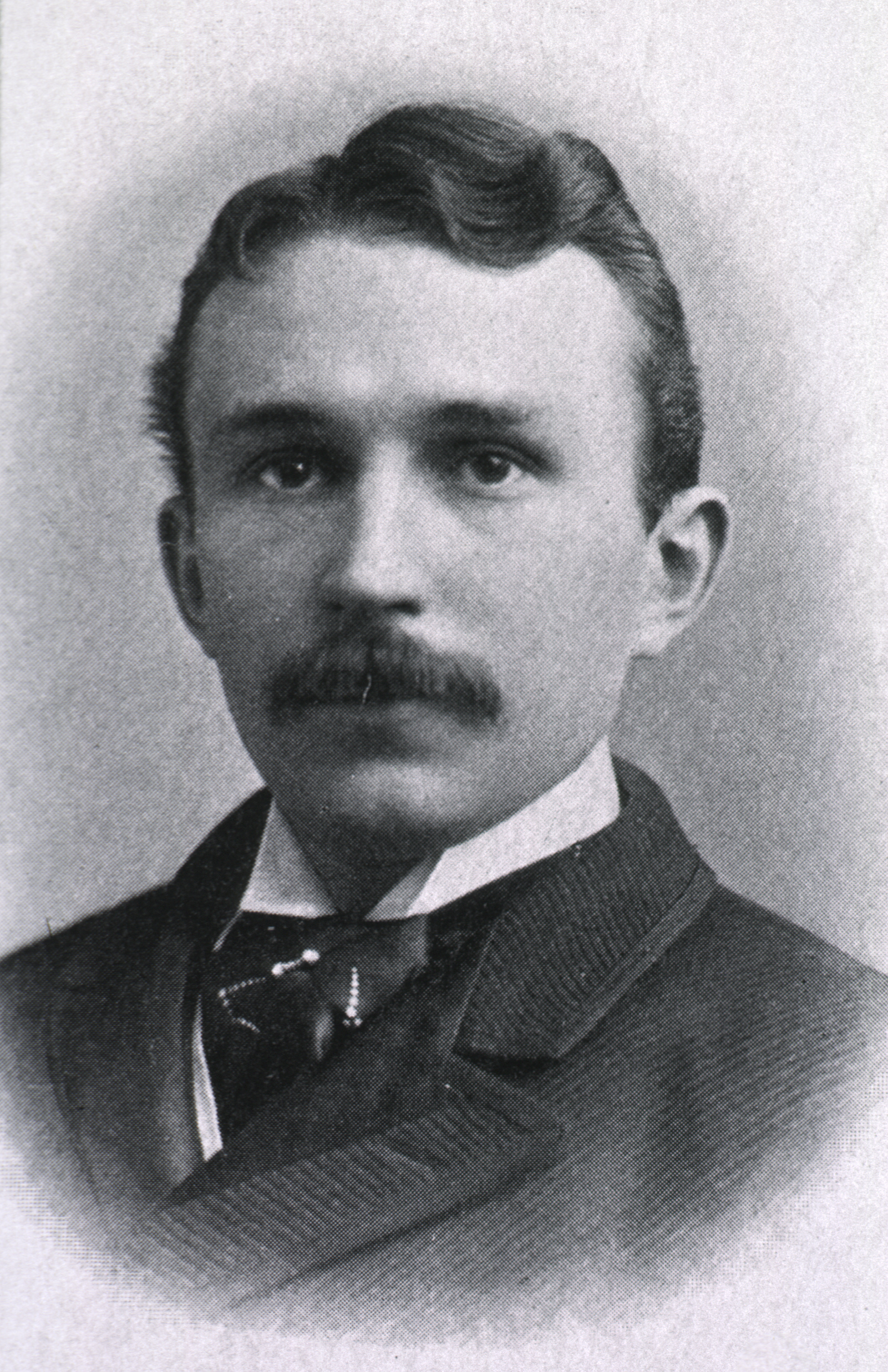
- Born: April 29, 1859; New York City, New York, U.S.
- Died: December 22, 1907 (aged 48)
- Education: Princeton University; New York University School of Medicine
- Spouse: Julia Josephine Stimson (m. 1887)
- Children: 3, including Alfred
- Parent(s): Sarah Patterson Loomis; Alfred Lebbeus Loomis
- Relatives: Alfred Lee Loomis Jr. (grandson); Henry Loomis (grandson)

Henry Patterson Loomis (April 29, 1859 − December 22, 1907) was an American physician who served as president of the American Academy of Medicine.

== Early life and education ==
Loomis was born in New York City on April 29, 1859. He was a son of Sarah Jane (née Patterson) Loomis and Dr. Alfred Lebbeus Loomis, a physician who served as president of the Association of American Physicians. After the death of his mother in 1880, his father remarried to Anna Maria (née Morris) Prince. His sister, Adeline E. Loomis, later married their stepbrother John Dyneley Prince in 1889.

He attended Princeton University, graduating in 1880. He received his medical degree from New York University School of Medicine in 1883, and studied at Heidelberg, Berlin and Vienna before returning to the U.S. in 1887.

== Career ==
Loomis was a leading expert on heart and lung diseases and was a contributor to several medical journals and the author of a number of treatises on diseases. Loomis was professor of pathology at New York University from 1887 to 1895, visiting physician at the New York Hospital in 1896, and consulting pathologist of the New York Board of Health in 1897. He was also a faculty member of Cornell University where he was a professor of therapeutics and clinical medicine.

== Personal life ==
On February 8, 1887, Loomis was married to Julia Josephine Stimson (1861–1933). Julia was a sister of Dr. Lewis Atterbury Stimson, a prominent surgeon and father of U.S. Secretary of State and War Henry Stimson. Together, they were the parents of three children:

- Alfred Lee Loomis (1887–1975), who married Ellen Holman Farnsworth, a sister of Henry Weston Farnsworth, in 1912.
- Julia Atterbury Loomis (1890–1974), who married Landon Ketchum Thorne (1888–1964).
- Henry Loomis, who died of rabies while still a small child; he was bitten by a rabid dog on the street near the family's house in Manhattan.

In the summer of 1907, Loomis's wife filed suit for divorce, claiming that Emilie Grigsby (an heiress of the estate of Charles T. Yerkes) had a relationship with Loomis. The family were snubbed socially as a result, since a divorce was regarded as a shameful event.

Loomis died of pneumonia on December 22, 1907, at his home in Manhattan before the divorce went through.

=== Descendants ===
Through his son Alfred, he was posthumously a grandfather of Alfred Lee Loomis Jr. who was an Olympic gold medalist sailor, William Farnsworth Loomis, and Henry Loomis who was director of the Voice of America.
