= Henry Loomis =

Henry Loomis may refer to:

- Henry Loomis (physician) (1859−1907), American physician
- Henry Loomis (broadcasting executive) (1919–2008), American broadcast executive and physicist
- Henry Loomis, a fictional character played by Jonathan Bailey in Jurassic World Rebirth
