= Lewis Atterbury Stimson =

Pioneer American surgeon (b.1844)

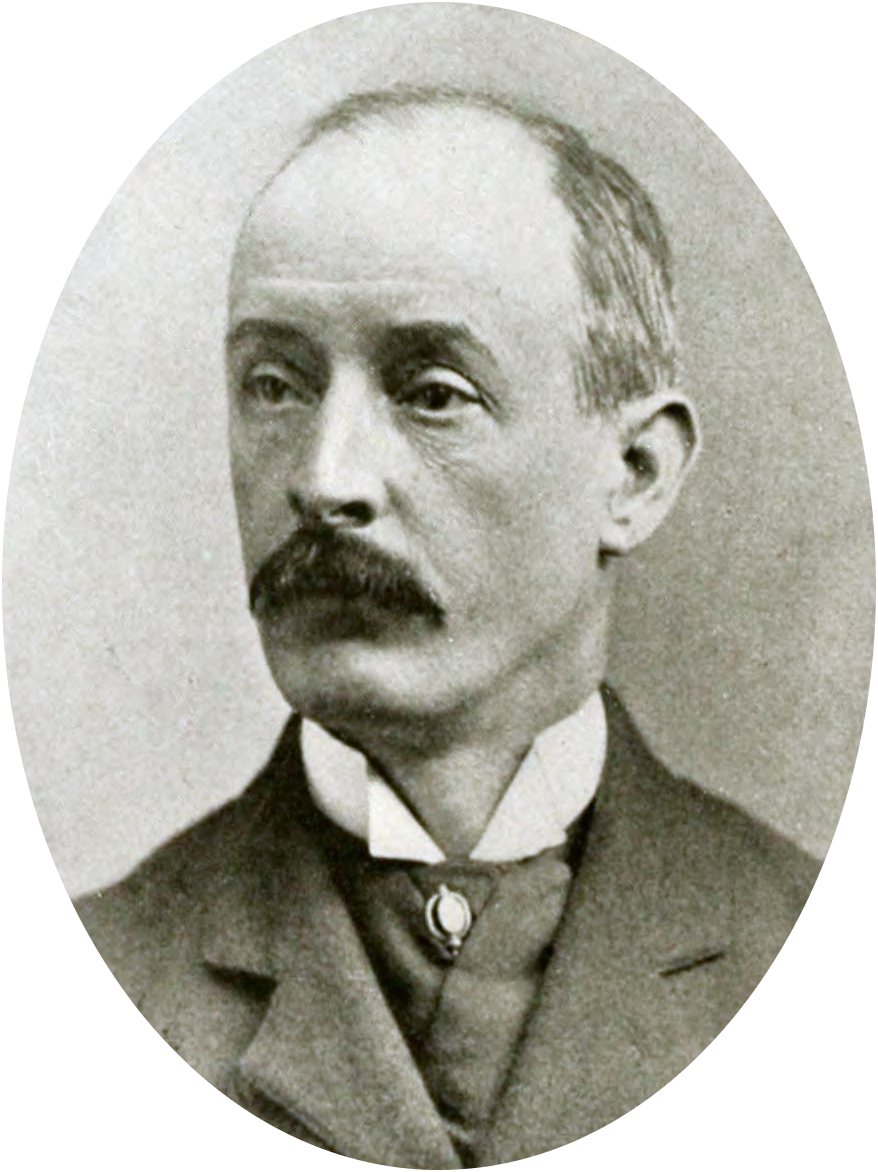
- Born: August 24, 1844; Paterson, New Jersey
- Died: September 17, 1917 (aged 73); Shinnecock Hills, New York
- Education: Yale University; Bellevue Medical College
- Spouse: Candace Thurber Wheeler (m. 1866; died 1876)
- Children: Henry Lewis Stimson; Candace C. Stimson
- Parent(s): Henry Clark Stimson; Julia Maria Atterbury
- Relatives: Candace Wheeler (mother-in-law); Henry Loomis (brother-in-law); Alfred Lee Loomis (nephew)

Lewis Atterbury Stimson (August 24, 1844 – September 17, 1917) was an American surgeon who was the first to perform a public operation in the United States using Joseph Lister's antiseptic technique.

== Early life ==
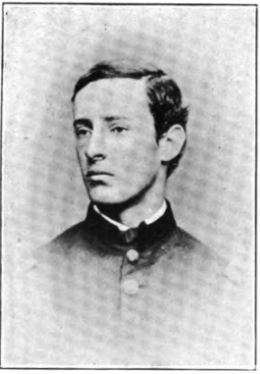
Lewis Atterbury Stimson, as a young man

Stimson was born on August 24, 1844, in Paterson, New Jersey. His parents were Henry Clark Stimson (1813–1894) and Julia Maria (née Atterbury) Stimson (1819–1908). His siblings included Henry A. Stimson (1843–1936), Catherine Boudinot Stimson Weston (1846–1942), Mary Atterbury Stimson (1848–1928), John Ward Stimson (1850–1930), William Frank Stimson (1853–1872), Frederick Julian Stimson (1856–1926), and Julia Josephine Stimson (1861–1933), who was married to Dr. Henry Patterson Loomis. He was the uncle of Alfred Lee Loomis (1887–1975), the inventor of the LORAN Long Range Navigation System.

Stimson attended and graduated from Yale University in 1863, followed by medical school at Bellevue Medical College.

== Career ==
In 1866, after marrying, he entered the banking office of his father and in 1867, became a member of the New York Stock Exchange. He remained active in business until 1871.

=== Medical career ===
In 1878, Stimson performed the first public demonstration of an antiseptic surgery in the United States, using Baron Joseph Lister's antiseptic technique. In December 1883, Stimson operated on former president Ulysses S. Grant's leg.

In 1898, Stimson wrote the charter of Cornell's new medical school, the Cornell University Medical College. He was instrumental in obtaining, along with William Mecklenburg Polk (1844–1918), the medical school's first dean, a gift of $1.5 million from Col. Oliver Hazard Payne to open the new medical college. Stimson was also a professor of surgery at the Cornell Medical College. He made advances in techniques for abdominal surgery and is attributed with developing the Stimson maneuver for reducing a dislocated shoulder or hip, which he described in the article, "An Easy Method of Reducing Dislocations of the Shoulder and Hip", published in New York Medical Record in 1900.

He was a member of the American Surgical Society, New York Medical Society, the County Medical Society, the Medical-Surgery Society. He was also a member of the Century Club, New York Yacht Club, and the Loyal Legion.

=== Yachting ===
In February 1905, he entered his yacht in the Kaiser's Cup.

In June 1905, Stimson was a dinner guest aboard the yacht, Hohenzollern, of Emperor Wilhelm II along with Robert Goelet.

In 1914, Stimson, a member of the New York Yacht Club, docked his yacht, Fleur de Lys, in Palermo, Italy.

== Personal life ==
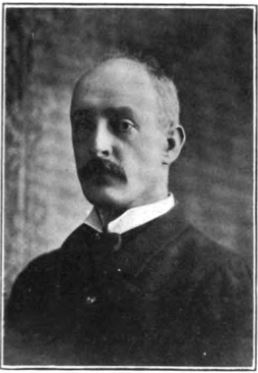
Lewis Atterbury Stimson

In 1866, Stimson was married to Candace Thurber Wheeler (1845–1876), the daughter of Thomas Mason Wheeler (1818-1895) and Candace Thurber Wheeler (1827–1923). They had met in Trenton, New Jersey. Wheeler was described as a "beautiful creature, endowed with all the graces and accomplishments — a rare musician and vocalist, and of a nature as lovely as her person." His biographer wrote that "his devotion to her began with their first meeting, and lasted as long as his life. It was the mainspring of much of the tenderness and compassion that marked his relation to humanity." Lewis and Candace were the parents of:

- Henry Lewis Stimson (1867–1950), Secretary of State in Herbert Hoover's Administration as well as Secretary of War in the William Howard Taft Administration and the Franklin Delano Roosevelt Administration.
- Candace C. Stimson (1869–1944), who helped administer the anti-tetanus serum around Europe during World War I with her father.

In a memorial written for Stimson after his death, Edward Lawrence Keyes (1843–1924) wrote about Stimson and his wife:

"Dr. Stimson impressed me as a man of very deep feeling which he kept under perfect restraint. He once drove me to Woodlawn Cemetery where he looked over his wife's grave. He spoke briefly but feelingly. I asked him how he ever survived such a loss. He replied, 'By years of constant, grinding work.'."

Stimson died on September 17, 1917, at Shinnecock Hills, New York.
