= John Dyneley Prince =

American linguist and diplomat

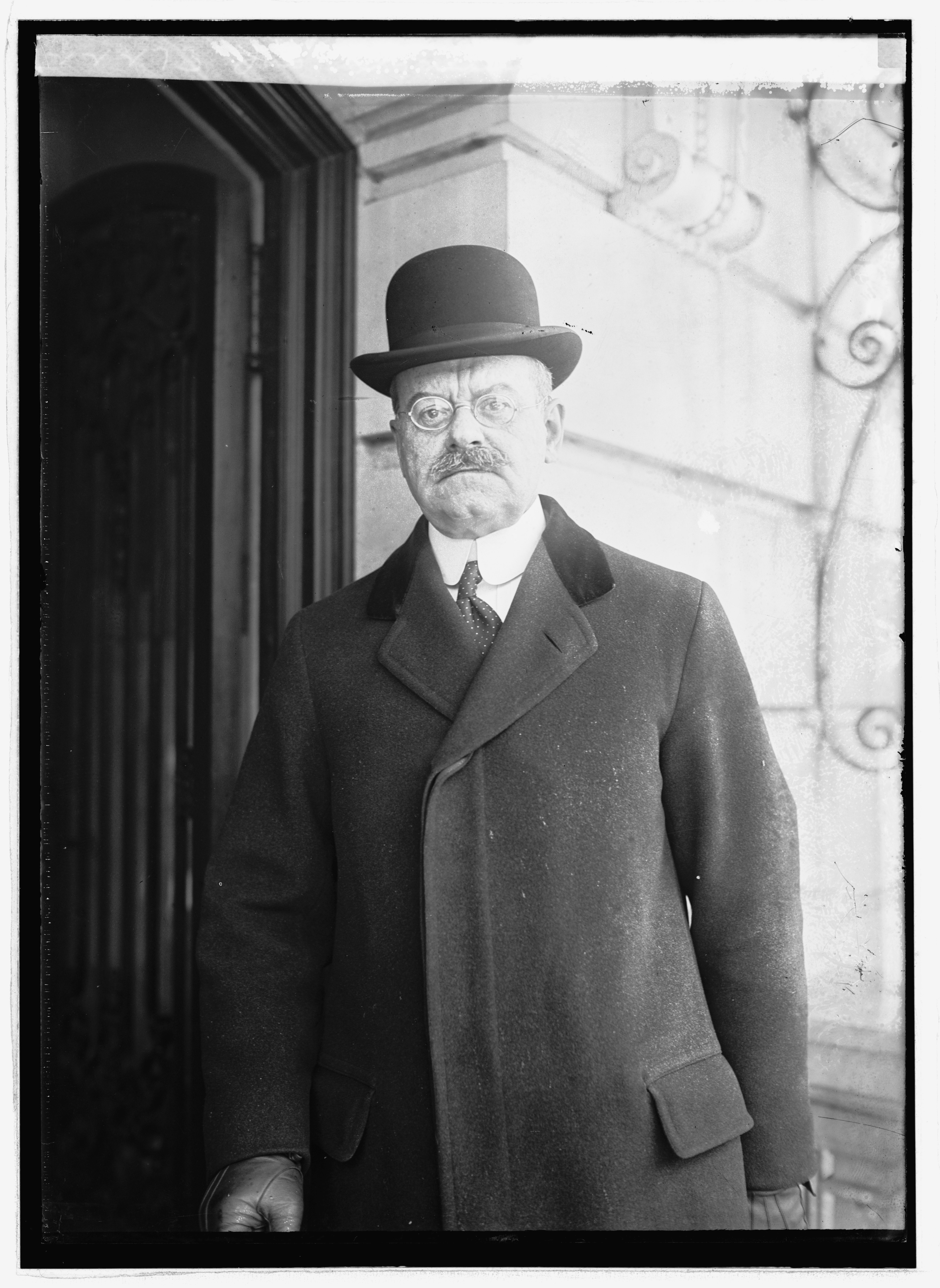
- Prince in 1923

United States Minister to Yugoslavia
- In office 1926–1932
- President: Calvin Coolidge; Herbert Hoover
- Preceded by: Henry Percival Dodge
- Succeeded by: Charles S. Wilson

United States Minister to Denmark
- In office 1921–1926
- President: Warren G. Harding; Calvin Coolidge
- Preceded by: Joseph Grew
- Succeeded by: Henry Percival Dodge

Personal details
- Born: April 17, 1868 New York City, U.S.
- Died: November 11, 1945 (aged 77) Manhattan, New York, U.S.
- Party: Republican
- Spouse: Adeline E. Loomis (after 1889)
- Children: John Dyneley Prince
- Parent(s): John Dyneley Prince; Anna Maria Morris
- Relatives: Reverdy Johnson (great-grandfather)
- Education: Columbia University; University of Berlin; Johns Hopkins University

John Dyneley Prince (April 17, 1868 – October 11, 1945) was an American linguist, diplomat, and politician. He was a professor at New York University and Columbia University, minister to Denmark and Yugoslavia, and leader of both houses of the New Jersey Legislature.

== Early life ==
Prince was born in New York City in 1868, the son of John Dyneley Prince (1843–1883) and Anna Maria (née Morris) Prince (1847–1904). His paternal grandparents were John Dyneley Prince and Mary (née Travers) Prince. His maternal grandparents were Thomas H. Morris and Mary (née Johnson) Morris (a daughter of Reverdy Johnson, a U.S. Senator from Maryland who also served as United States Attorney General). After the death of his father in 1883, his mother remarried to Dr. Alfred Lebbeus Loomis, who served as president of the Association of American Physicians. His step brother was Henry Patterson Loomis.

He attended Columbia Grammar School. Prince had a strong interest in foreign languages as a child, acquiring basic skills in speaking the Romani and Shelta languages by the age of 12, after reading Charles Godfrey Leland's ethnographic accounts of the Gypsies. As retold in his 1939 memoir Fragments from Babel, he ran away with another boy from their families in New York to a Gypsy camp near Newark, New Jersey, where they spent three days and were accepted because of his proficiency in their language. He also learned Welsh and Turkish in his youth.

Prince attended Columbia University, graduating with a B.A. in 1888. He represented Columbia on the University of Pennsylvania's Babylonian expedition, where Sultan Abdul Hamid II of the Ottoman Empire heard of his language skills and made him an honorary captain of the troops that protected the expedition, after conversing with Prince in Turkish. He then studied Semitic languages at University of Berlin from 1888 to 1889 and received his Ph.D from Johns Hopkins University in 1892.

== Career ==
He was professor of Semitic languages at New York University from 1892 to 1902 and dean of its Graduate School from 1895 to 1902.

Prince served as a professor of Semitic languages on the faculty of Columbia University from 1902 to 1915, when he was named professor of Slavonic languages at Columbia from 1915 to 1921 and again from 1933 to 1935, whereupon he was named professor of East European languages from 1935 to 1937. During this time, Prince also first studied the local 'Jersey Dutch', the localised language of the original Dutch settlers in the area. for which he taught himself Dutch. At the time of his 'discovery', the language was already nearly extinct.

Prince was elected to the American Philosophical Society in 1913.

=== Political career ===
Prince entered New Jersey politics, using his language skills to reach out to various ethnic groups of constituents in their native tongues. He was a Republican member of the New Jersey General Assembly from 1906 to 1909, serving as Speaker of the Assembly in his final year. From 1910 to 1913 he served in the New Jersey Senate representing Passaic County, and was President of the Senate in 1912, in which role he served as Acting Governor while Governor Woodrow Wilson was out of state.

While serving as Acting Governor, Prince found an anonymous seventeenth-century manuscript in the state archives containing a list of Delaware-based trade jargon. Prince analyzed the word list in a 1912 article in American Anthropologist entitled "An Ancient New Jersey Indian Jargon."

=== Diplomatic career ===
Prince served as president of the New Jersey Civil Service Commission from 1917 to 1921, when he was chosen by Warren G. Harding to be Minister to Denmark. In 1926, Calvin Coolidge appointed him Minister to the Kingdom of the Serbs, Croats, and Slovenes. He continued to serve as ambassador after the nation was renamed the Kingdom of Yugoslavia in 1929. He served until 1932, after which time he returned to his professorship at Columbia, retiring in 1937.

== Personal life ==
On October 5, 1889, Prince was married to his step-sister, Adeline E. Loomis, the daughter of Dr. Alfred L. Loomis. In 1891, they moved to Ringwood Manor in Ringwood in Passaic County, New Jersey. Their only child, John Dyneley Prince, Jr., was born that year.

Prince died of a heart ailment at his Manhattan home in 1945 at the age of 77.

== Works ==
- John Dyneley Prince (1909). Assyrian primer: an inductive method of learning the cuneiform characters. The Columbia university press. pp. 58.

Political offices
Preceded by Frank B. Jess	Speaker of the New Jersey General Assembly; 1909	Succeeded by Harry P. Ward
Preceded by Ernest R. Ackerman	President of the New Jersey Senate; 1912	Succeeded by James F. Fielder
Diplomatic posts
Preceded by Joseph Grew	U.S. Ambassador to Denmark; 1921–1926	Succeeded by Henry Percival Dodge
Preceded by Henry Percival Dodge	U.S. Ambassador to Yugoslavia; 1926–1932	Succeeded by Charles S. Wilson
