= Aberdeen chronograph =

Portable gun chronograph

The Aberdeen chronograph was the first portable gun chronograph, an instrument for measuring the muzzle velocity and striking power of a projectile fired by a gun. It was invented in 1918 by Alfred Lee Loomis at the U.S. Army's Aberdeen Proving Ground.

The method prevalent at the time was the Boulengé chronograph, which relied on the projectile passing through two wire screens. Breaking the first screen would release a rod held by electromagnets. While the rod was free-falling, breaking the second screen would activate a knife that marked the rod.

Loomis' chronograph had a drum rotating at constant speed with a tape spooled inside. The projectile would pass through two screens, breaking the insulation between metal plates and creating a short circuit. This created a spark that left two visible marks on the tape and measuring the distance between these marks would give the speed of the projectile. This method made it easier to measure the speed of larger shells and aircraft catapults. Loomis was issued a patent in 1921 for his chronograph.
