= Henry Loomis (broadcasting executive) =

Director of the Voice of America (1919–2008)

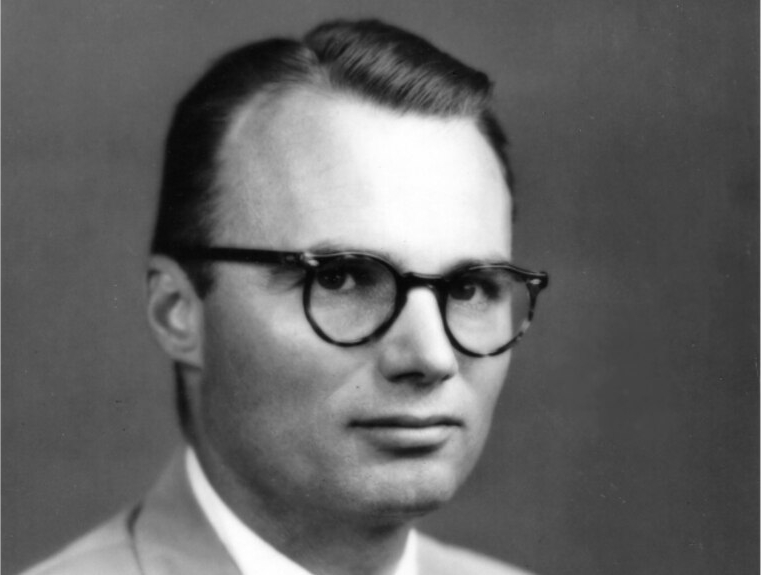
- Born: April 19, 1919; Tuxedo Park, New York, U.S.
- Died: November 2, 2008 (aged 89)
- Father: Alfred Lee Loomis
- Relatives: Alfred Loomis (brother)

Henry Loomis (April 19, 1919 – November 2, 2008) was an American broadcasting executive and physicist. He was director of Voice of America from 1958 to 1965, and president of the Corporation for Public Broadcasting from 1972 to 1978.

== Early life ==
Loomis was born on April 19, 1919, in Tuxedo Park, New York. His father, Alfred Lee Loomis, built a fortune financing public utilities and sold out just before the Wall Street crash of 1929. Alfred Loomis set up a physics laboratory in an old mansion where Henry worked with his father as a teenager on brain-wave research, including participating as a volunteer in his father's experiments. The two later took part in pioneering research on radar.

Loomis attended Harvard University and left in 1940 during his senior year to enlist in the United States Navy. Harvard granted him an undergraduate degree in 1946 based on his radar instruction while in the navy.

== Career ==
In the navy, he was on the staff of the Commander in Chief Pacific Fleet Headquarters in Pearl Harbor. Loomis was responsible for the creation of training materials for radar, and worked with pilots and officers on ships to help overcome their wariness of the technology and develop their skills in its use. Loomis was awarded the Bronze Star Medal and left the navy with the rank of lieutenant commander.

Late in the war, Loomis had a chance meeting with United States Secretary of War Henry L. Stimson, a cousin of Loomis, and Lt. Gen. Leslie Groves, head of the Manhattan Project. In a discussion about potential target cities in Japan for the atomic bomb being developed, Loomis dissuaded them from targeting Kyoto, citing the city's art treasures he had learned about while studying Japanese history at Harvard.

He attended the University of California, Berkeley, after the war, where he took graduate courses in physics, including work as an assistant with Ernest Lawrence at the school's radiation laboratory. He spent four years as assistant to James Rhyne Killian, president of the Massachusetts Institute of Technology and led the research and intelligence functions at the United States Information Agency. Loomis later directed the staff of Killian, who had been appointed as the President's science advisor.

He served for 13 years on the board of the not-for-profit Mitre Corporation, which was affiliated with the Massachusetts Institute of Technology and worked with the Central Intelligence Agency and United States Department of Defense after graduating from Berkeley.

=== Voice of America ===
Loomis was appointed by President Eisenhower in May 1958 to head the Voice of America, succeeding Robert E. Button.

As Director, Loomis had transmitters erected in Liberia and the Philippines, and in four other countries that had not been previously reached by their signals. These new broadcasting stations were announced in 1959 as additions to the eight stations that existed at the time, as part of a 5-year, $40 million expansion of services. The broadcasting power of the Voice of America was also increased.

Under Loomis's guidance, the first Charter of the Voice of America was established, as part of an effort to ensure that the Voice of America would win the attention and respect of listeners. The initial version of the Charter was approved by President Eisenhower shortly before he left office. The current version of the Charter, signed into law in 1976 by President Gerald Ford, protects the independence and integrity of Voice of America programming, specifying that it will be "a consistently reliable and authoritative source of news", that it will represent the entire United States and will "present a balanced and comprehensive projection of significant American thought and institutions" and that it "will present the policies of the United States clearly and effectively, and will also present responsible discussions and opinion on these policies." Loomis expressed his belief that the Charter was "so fundamental and so represents the realities of the world and the moral principles that undergird this nation, that the Charter will endure for the life of the Voice." President John F. Kennedy in a 1962 visit to the headquarters of the Voice of America, emphasized the importance of journalistic integrity, stating that "You are obliged to tell our story in a truthful way, to tell it, as Oliver Cromwell said about his portrait, to paint us 'with all our blemishes and warts,' all those things about us that may not be immediately attractive."

As part of an effort to help make English a world language, Loomis oversaw the introduction on October 19, 1959, of the use of Special English, in which news is read slowly using a limited vocabulary of about 1,500 words with a simplified grammar and short pauses between adjacent words to make word boundaries more easily discernible. The target audience for Special English is people who have learned English in school, but are less than fluent and do not speak it in daily usage.

In February 1962, Loomis announced the addition of three new short-wave radio transmitters that would allow it to better compete with Radio Moscow and Peiping Radio, and to help reach through the jamming of its signal.

Under Loomis, the Voice of America reported on the pressing stories of the day, including round-the-clock coverage in Spanish and expanded English-language reporting during the Cuban Missile Crisis in 1962. The VOA broadcast Dr. Martin Luther King Jr.'s I Have a Dream speech live around the world in August 1963 during the March on Washington for Jobs and Freedom.

Loomis resigned from his post in 1965, citing increasing pressure from the Johnson administration to refrain from reporting news that would reflect negatively on the White House, particularly on the nation's increasing military involvement in Southeast Asia. The Johnson White House wanted the Voice of America to refrain from reporting on United States Air Force missions over Laos. Loomis noted in his farewell speech that "The Voice of America is not the voice of the administration."

=== Corporation for Public Broadcasting ===
President Richard M. Nixon appointed Loomis in September 1972 as president of the Corporation for Public Broadcasting, overseeing money to be allocated to public television stations, in an appointment that Time magazine described as evidence that "the localists appear to have won the battle". Loomis, then deputy director of the United States Information Agency, was named to replace John W. Macy. Jr., who had been the first head of the Corporation when it was established in 1969, and had been a longtime advocate of centralization of public broadcasting. Loomis removed control over programming from the Public Broadcasting Service, decentralizing control and redistributing the funds to local stations.

In December 1977, Loomis announced that he would step down as president when his term ended in September 1978, or would leave earlier if a successor was selected. Loomis resigned in 1978 in a wave of centralization back to PBS under the Carter administration.

== Personal life ==
Loomis's brother, Alfred, was a sailor who competed at the 1948 Summer Olympics in London, where he won a gold medal in the 6 Metre class with the boat Uanoria.

=== Death ===
Loomis died on November 2, 2008, aged 89, in Jacksonville, Florida, owing to complications of Alzheimer's disease, Parkinson's disease and Pick's disease.
