= Henry L. Stimson =

American politician (1867–1950)

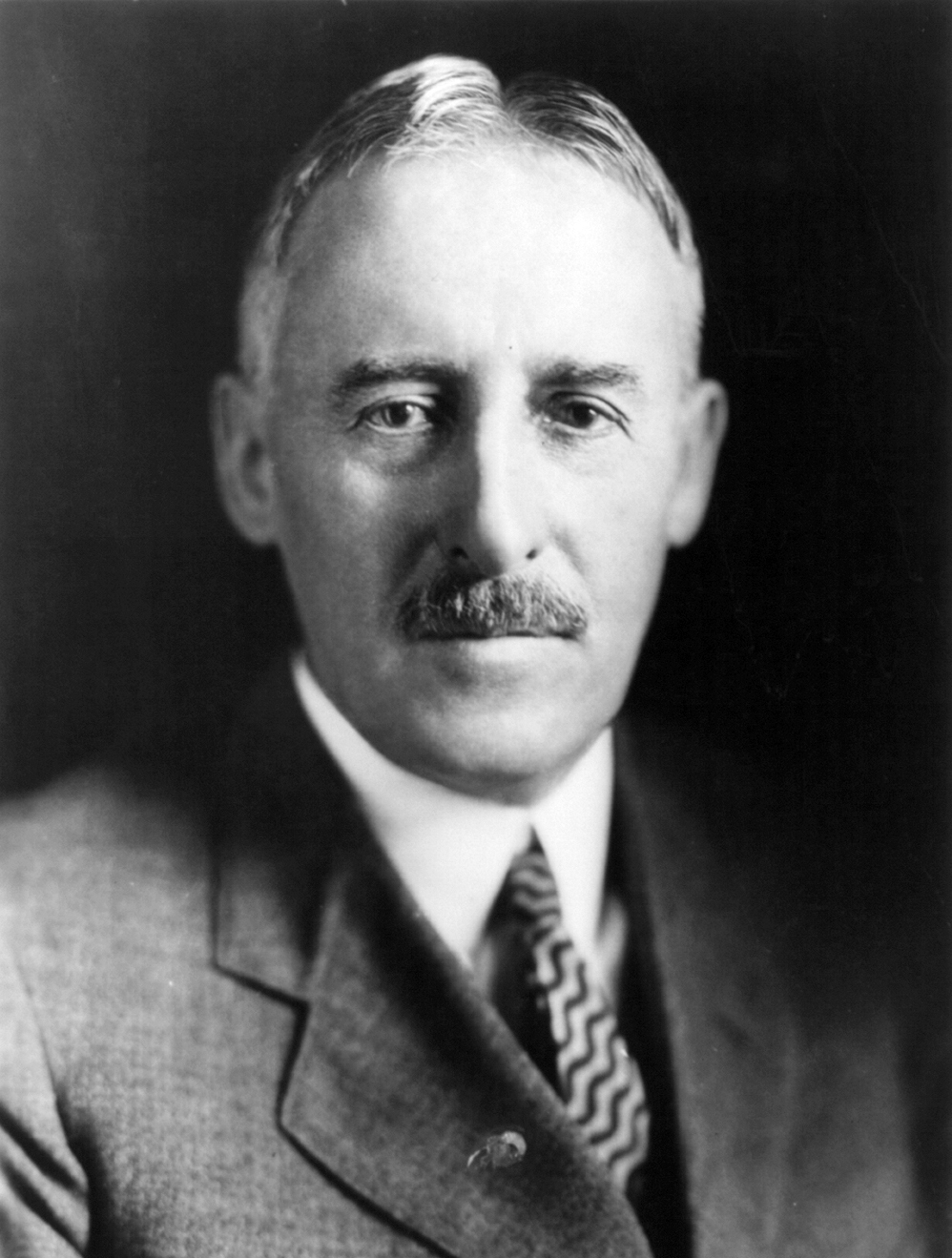
- Stimson in 1931

45th & 54th United States Secretary of War
- In office July 10, 1940 – September 21, 1945
- President: Franklin D. Roosevelt; Harry S. Truman
- Deputy: Robert P. Patterson; John J. McCloy
- Preceded by: Harry H. Woodring
- Succeeded by: Robert P. Patterson
- In office May 22, 1911 – March 4, 1913
- President: William Howard Taft
- Deputy: Robert Shaw Oliver
- Preceded by: Jacob M. Dickinson
- Succeeded by: Lindley Miller Garrison

46th United States Secretary of State
- In office March 28, 1929 – March 4, 1933
- President: Herbert Hoover
- Deputy: Joseph P. Cotton; William Castle
- Preceded by: Frank B. Kellogg
- Succeeded by: Cordell Hull

Governor-General of the Philippines
- In office December 27, 1927 – February 23, 1929
- President: Calvin Coolidge
- Deputy: Eugene Allen Gilmore
- Preceded by: Eugene Allen Gilmore (Acting)
- Succeeded by: Eugene Allen Gilmore (Acting)

United States Attorney for the Southern District of New York
- In office January 1906 – April 8, 1909
- President: Theodore Roosevelt; William Howard Taft
- Preceded by: Henry Lawrence Burnett
- Succeeded by: Henry Wise

Personal details
- Born: Henry Lewis Stimson; September 21, 1867 New York City, U.S.
- Died: October 20, 1950 (aged 83) Huntington, New York, U.S.
- Party: Republican
- Spouse: Mabel Wellington White
- Parent(s): Lewis Stimson; Candace Thurber Wheeler
- Education: Yale University (BA); Harvard University (LLB)

Military service
- Branch/service: United States Army
- Years of service: 1917–1929
- Rank: Brigadier General
- Unit: 77th Field Artillery Regiment
- Battles/wars: World War I

Henry Lewis Stimson (September 21, 1867 – October 20, 1950) was an American statesman, lawyer, and politician. Over his long career, he emerged as a leading figure in U.S. foreign policy by serving in both Republican and Democratic administrations. He served as Secretary of War (1911–1913) under President William Howard Taft, Secretary of State (1929–1933) under President Herbert Hoover, and again Secretary of War (1940–1945) under Presidents Franklin D. Roosevelt and Harry S. Truman, overseeing American military efforts during World War II.

The son of surgeon Lewis Atterbury Stimson and Candace C. Stimson (née Wheeler, daughter of Candace Thurber Wheeler), Stimson became a Wall Street lawyer after graduating from Harvard Law School. He served as a United States attorney under President Theodore Roosevelt, and prosecuted several antitrust cases. After he was defeated in the 1910 New York gubernatorial election, Stimson served as Secretary of War under Taft. He continued the reorganization of the United States Army that had begun under his mentor, Elihu Root. After the outbreak of World War I, Stimson became part of the Preparedness Movement. He served as an artillery officer in France after the United States entered the war. From 1927 to 1929, he served as governor-general of the Philippines under President Calvin Coolidge.

In 1929, President Hoover appointed Stimson as Secretary of State. Stimson sought to avoid a worldwide naval race, and thus helped negotiate the London Naval Treaty. He protested the Japanese invasion of Manchuria, which instituted the Stimson Doctrine of nonrecognition of international territorial changes that are executed by force.

After World War II broke out in Europe, Stimson accepted President Franklin Roosevelt's appointment to return as Secretary of War. After the U.S. entered the war, Stimson, working closely with Army Chief of Staff George C. Marshall, took charge of raising and training 13 million soldiers and airmen, supervised the spending of a third of the nation's GDP on the Army and the Air Forces, helped formulate military strategy, and oversaw the Manhattan Project to build the first atomic bombs. He supported the atomic bombings of Hiroshima and Nagasaki, but convinced Truman to take the historic city of Kyoto off the atom bomb target list. During and after the war, Stimson strongly opposed the Morgenthau Plan, which would have deindustrialized and partitioned Germany into several smaller states. He also insisted on judicial proceedings against Nazi war criminals, which led to the Nuremberg trials.

Stimson retired from office in September 1945 and died in 1950.

== Early life and career ==
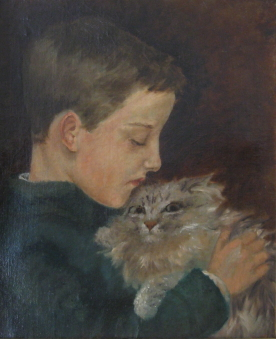
Young Stimson with Mimi, the cat, portrait by Dora Wheeler Keith

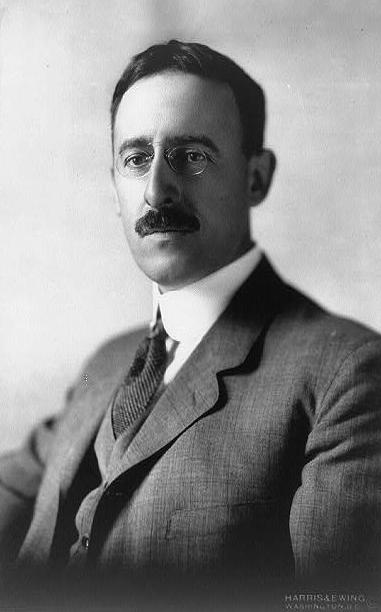
Stimson as a young lawyer

Stimson was born in 1867 in Manhattan, New York City, the son of Lewis Atterbury Stimson, a prominent surgeon, and his wife, the former Candace Thurber Wheeler. When he was nine, his mother died of kidney failure, and he was then sent to boarding school.

He spent summers with his grandmother Candace Wheeler at her Catskills country house and played with his uncle Dunham Wheeler, who was almost the same age, in "the Armory", which was their nickname for one corner of a large room in the house. Roaming the Catskill Mountains, he grew to love the outdoors and would become an avid sportsman.

He was educated at Phillips Academy in Andover, Massachusetts, where he gained a lifelong interest in religion and a close relationship with the school. He later donated Woodley, his Washington, D.C. estate, to the school in his will. The property is now the Maret School. He was an honorary lifetime member of Theodore Roosevelt's Boone and Crockett Club, North America's first wildlife conservation organization. He was a Phillips trustee from 1905 to 1947 and served as president of the board from 1935 to 1945.

He then attended Yale College, where he was elected to Phi Beta Kappa. He joined Skull and Bones, a secret society that afforded many contacts for the rest of his life. He graduated in 1888, and attended Harvard Law School, where he graduated in 1890. He joined the prestigious Wall Street law firm of Root and Clark in 1891, and became a partner in 1893. Elihu Root, a future Secretary of War and Secretary of State, became a major influence on and role model for Stimson.

Stimson developed a close relationship with Alfred Lee Loomis, his first cousin twenty years his junior, and "became the father that Loomis never had. Loomis became the son that Stimson could not have, because he was sterile."

In 1906, President Theodore Roosevelt appointed Stimson U.S. attorney for the Southern District of New York, where Stimson made a distinguished record prosecuting antitrust cases. He served from 1937 to 1939 as president of the New York City Bar Association, where a medal honoring his service as a U.S. attorney is still awarded in his honor.

Stimson was defeated as the Republican candidate for governor of New York in 1910.

He joined the Council on Foreign Relations at its inception and was described by The New York Times as "the group's quintessential member".

== Secretary of War (1911–1913) ==
In 1911, President William Howard Taft appointed Stimson as Secretary of War. Stimson continued the reorganization of the army that had begun by Elihu Root, which improved its efficiency prior to its vast expansion in World War I. The “Stimson Plan” reorganized the Army in the United States into four departments (Eastern, Western, Southern, and Central), two overseas departments (Hawaiian and Philippine), and created three coast artillery commands (North Atlantic, South Atlantic, and Pacific Coast Artillery Districts). In 1913, Stimson left office following the accession of President Woodrow Wilson.

== World War I ==
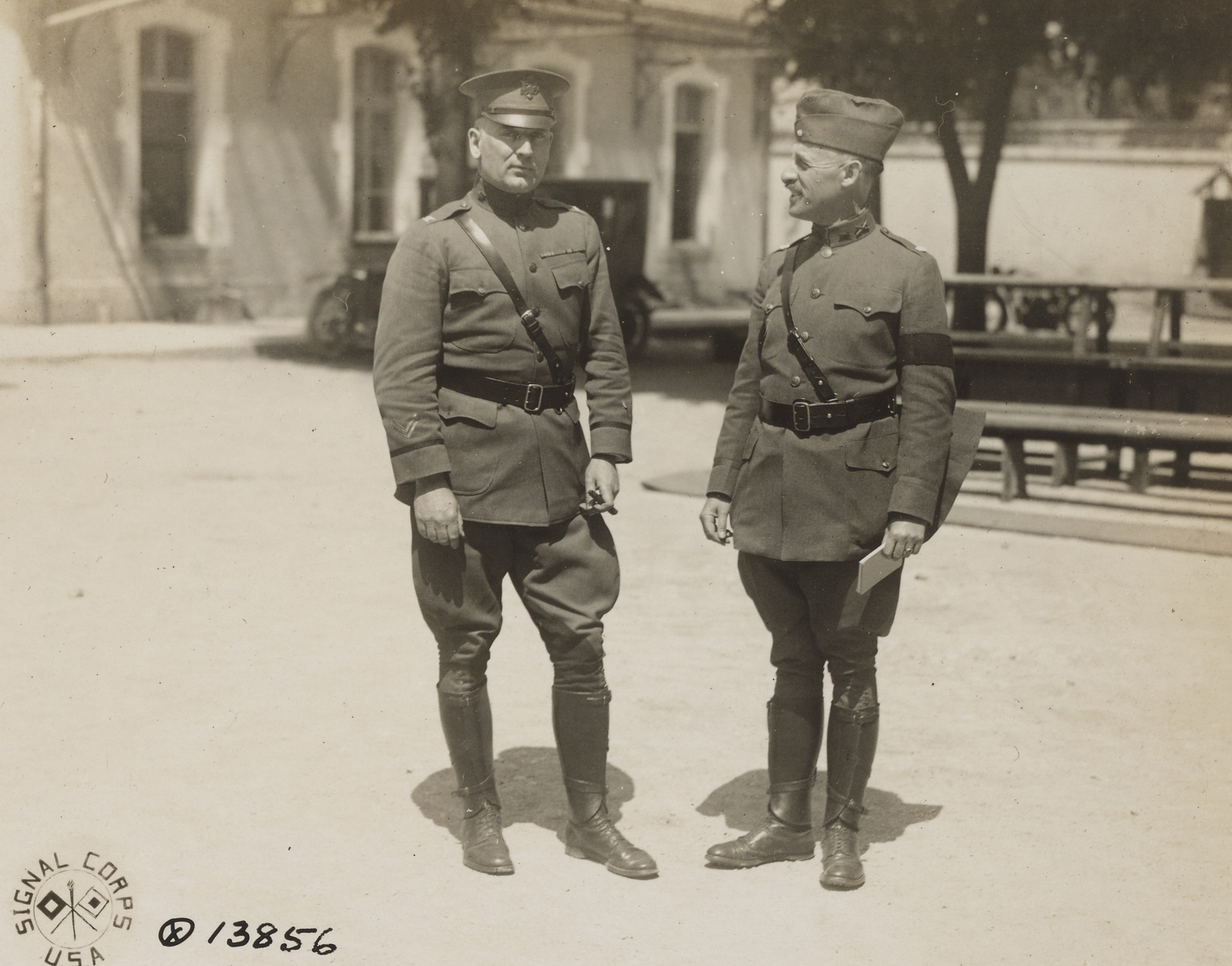
Lieutenant Colonel Alfred William Bjornstad, organizer and director of the U.S. Army Staff College in France, and Lieutenant Colonel Henry L. Stimson who is about to leave the college, July 1918.

Following the outbreak of World War I in 1914, Stimson was a strong supporter of Britain and France, although also supported U.S. neutrality. He called for preparation of a large, powerful army and was active in the privately funded Plattsburg Training Camp Movement to train potential officers.

After the U.S. declared war on the German Empire in April 1917, Stimson was one of the 18 men selected by former President Theodore Roosevelt to raise a volunteer infantry division for service in France in 1917. However, President Woodrow Wilson refused to make use of the volunteers, and the unit was disbanded. Stimson subsequently served in the regular U.S. Army in France as an artillery officer and reached the rank of colonel in August 1918. He continued his military service in the Organized Reserve Corps and rose to the rank of brigadier general in 1922.

== Nicaragua and the Philippines ==
In April 1927, Stimson was sent by President Calvin Coolidge to Nicaragua to negotiate an end to the Nicaraguan Civil War. Stimson wrote that Nicaraguans "were not fitted for the responsibilities that go with independence and still less fitted for popular self-government." He opposed independence for the Philippines for the same reason after he had been appointed governor-general of the Philippines, an office that he held from 1927 to 1929.

== Secretary of State (1929–1933) ==
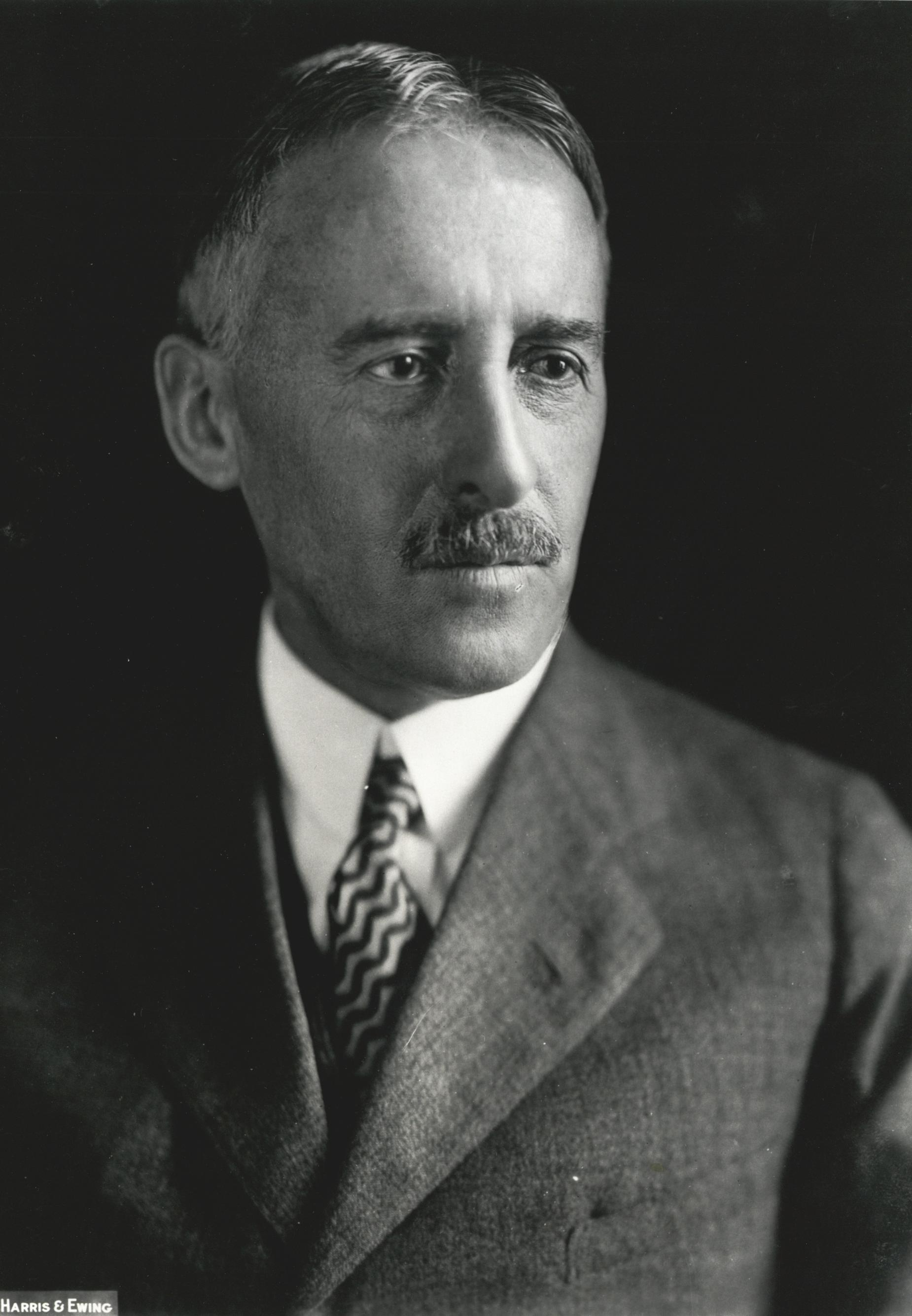
Stimson in 1929

Stimson returned to the cabinet in 1929, when U.S. President Herbert Hoover appointed him US Secretary of State. Both served until 1933. Stimson lived in the Woodley Mansion in Washington, D.C., where he remained through 1946.

Shortly after being appointed as the new Secretary of State, Stimson shut down the Cipher Bureau (U.S. cryptanalytic service, later known as the "Black Chamber") in 1929. According to the NSA's Center for Cryptologic History, Stimson likely dissolved the bureau for budgetary reasons. But he also considered intercepting diplomatic communications unethical, reputedly saying: "Gentlemen do not read each other's mail." By the advent of World War II in 1940 it appears Stimson had changed his mind, at least as to the ethics of codebreaking.

In 1930 and 1931, Stimson was the chairman of the U.S. delegation to the London Naval Conference of 1930. In the following year, he was the Chairman of the U.S. delegation to World Disarmament Conference in Geneva. The same year, the United States issued the "Stimson Doctrine" in response to Japanese invasion of Manchuria. It stated that the U.S. refused to recognize any situation or treaty that limited U.S. treaty rights or was brought about by aggression.

On October 5, 1931, the League of Nations received a strongly worded letter from Stimson urging it to pressure Japan against aggression in China, and informing the League that the U.S. would support the League's actions.

Returning to private life at the end of the Hoover administration, Stimson was an outspoken opponent of Japanese aggression.

== Secretary of War (1940–1945) ==
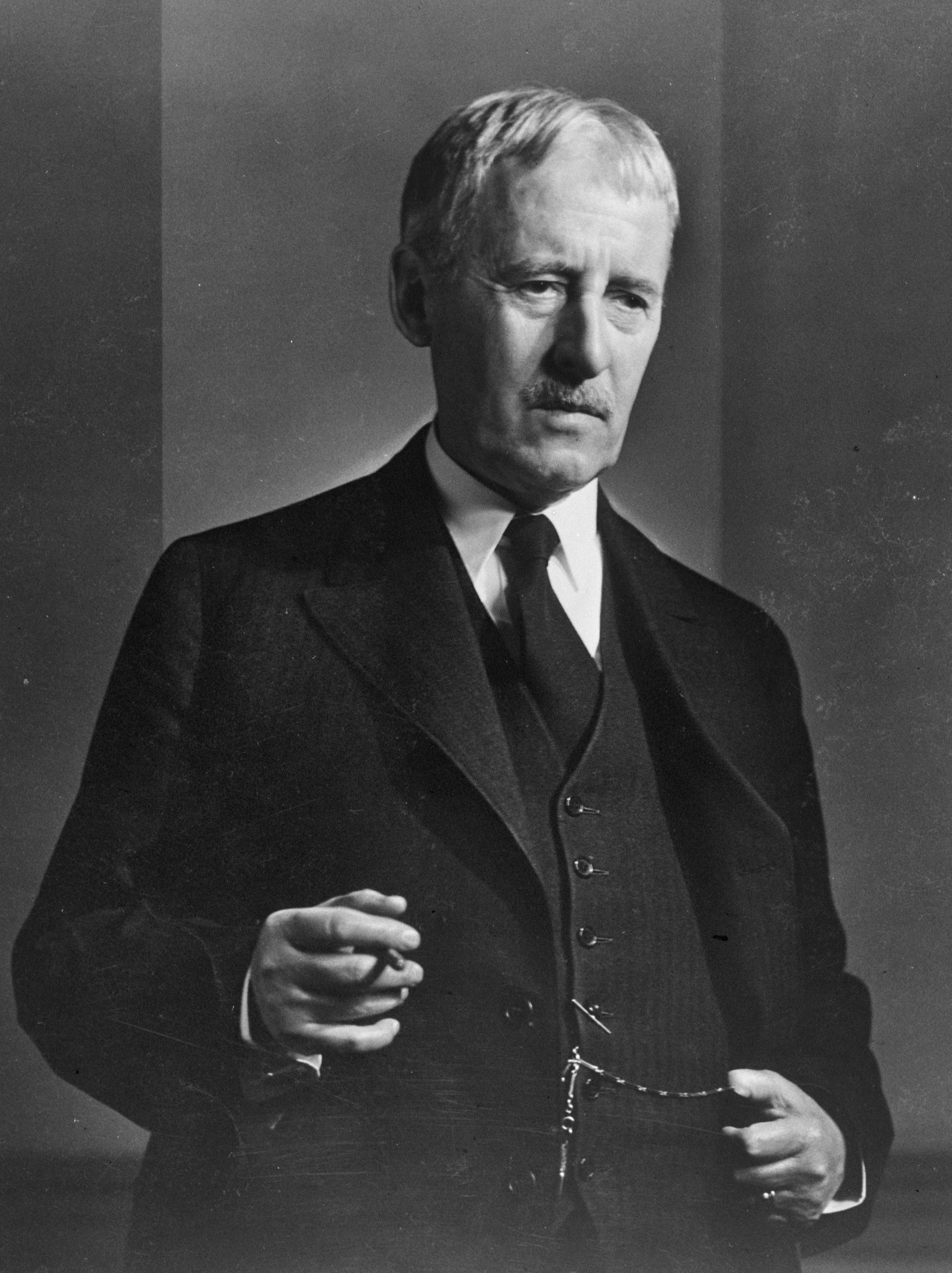
Stimson in 1944.

After World War II broke out, Roosevelt returned Stimson to his post at the head of the War Department, in July 1940. The choice of Stimson, a conservative Republican (and anti-New Dealer), and Frank Knox as Secretary of the Navy, was a calculated effort by the president to win bipartisan support for what was considered the almost-inevitable U.S. entrance into the war.

In the seventeen months leading up to the Japanese attack on Pearl Harbor, Stimson, working side-by-side with U.S. Army Chief of Staff George C. Marshall (in offices adjacent to one another where the door between them was deliberately left open at all times) led efforts to prepare an unprepared America for war. Together, Stimson and Marshall had to build up the Army and Army Air Corps, organize housing and training for the soldiers, and oversee the design, testing, production, and distribution of the machines, weapons, and materials required to support the country and its allies.

Ten days before the attack on Pearl Harbor, Stimson entered in his diary the following statement: "[Roosevelt] brought up the event that we are likely to be attacked perhaps next Monday, for the Japanese are notorious for making an attack without warning, and the question was what we should do. The question was how we should maneuver them into the position of firing the first shot without allowing too much danger to ourselves."

With respect to the war in Europe, Stimson was "pro-British" even before Pearl Harbor. Stimson's view was the British Royal Navy, fighting Nazi Germany in the Atlantic, was protecting America, and was the reason the U.S. did not, for the time being, "have to do the fighting ourselves." Stimson said America should "rely on the shield of the British Navy," and that on that basis the U.S. should do everything possible to arm and supply the British.

Because of this view, when the Senate voted to confirm him, all of the most notorious isolationist senators such as Henrik Shipstead and Ernest Lundeen of Minnesota, Gerald Nye of North Dakota, Robert Marion La Follette of Wisconsin, David I. Walsh of Massachusetts and Burton K. Wheeler of Montana voted against his confirmation on the grounds he was "too pro-British" whereas all of the most "Anglophile" senators such as John H. Bankhead II and J. Lister Hill of Alabama, Kenneth McKellar and Tom Stewart of Tennessee, Harry Schwartz and Joseph C. O'Mahoney of Wyoming all spoke in favor of Stimson and his foreign policy views, and voted to confirm him as Secretary of War. The British government watched his confirmation vote closely, hoping he would have enough votes to get confirmed by the Senate, and they celebrated when he was confirmed.

Stimson and Frank Knox, both "vigorous interventionists", were confirmed by the Senate at the same time. Both advocated American entry into World War II on the side of the United Kingdom, earning them the title of "war hawks" from isolationists. Knox was described as "even more of a Hawk than Stimson." Stimson and Knox were explicitly hired by FDR to replace Harry Hines Woodring and Charles Edison, respectively, on the grounds that Woodring and Edison were isolationists who did not agree with the philosophy of helping Great Britain in their war against the Nazis. Stimson referred to the views of isolationists as "hopelessly twisted."

The power of isolationists explains why Stimson did not record "shock, horror or anger" after Roosevelt informed him of the attack on Pearl Harbor. Instead, he wrote, "my first feeling was of relief that the indecision was over and that a crisis had come in a way which would unite our people (…) For I feel this country united has practically nothing to fear while the apathy and visions stirred up by unpatriotic men have been hitherto very discouraging."

During the war, Stimson oversaw a great expansion of the military, including drafting and training of 13 million soldiers and airmen as well as purchasing and transporting 30 percent of the nation's industrial output to the battlefields. In addition to George Marshall, Stimson worked closely with his top aides Robert P. Patterson, who succeeded Stimson as secretary; Robert Lovett, who handled the Air Force; Harvey Bundy; and John J. McCloy, assistant Secretary of War.

Stimson was 73 when he took the reins as War Secretary, and many critics questioned whether a man of his age could handle the job. He defied all naysayers and plunged into the task with "an energy that men 20 years his junior could not have mustered." However, at 75, Stimson confessed that he was "feeling very tired. The unconscious strain has been pretty heavy on me."

=== Japanese American internment ===
Stimson was initially opposed to the internment of Japanese Americans away from the West Coast, but he eventually gave in to pro-exclusion military advisers and secured Roosevelt's final approval for the incarceration program. The administration was split in the wake of Pearl Harbor, with Justice Department officials arguing against "evacuation" and the Army and the War Department leaders demanding the immediate relocation. Still opposed to the idea of wholesale eviction, Stimson spent much of January 1942 in fielding calls from military advisers and West Coast politicians on the potential threat of a Japanese American fifth column. By February, John McCloy and others from the pro-exclusion camp had won him over.

On February 11, Stimson and McCloy briefed in a phone conference Roosevelt, who gave his Secretary of War the go-ahead to pursue whatever course he saw fit. McCloy contacted Karl Bendetsen to begin formulating a removal strategy immediately after. Roosevelt granted Stimson the final approval to carry out the eviction of West Coast Japanese Americans on February 17, and two days later, Roosevelt issued Executive Order 9066, which authorized the establishment of military zones that excluded certain persons.

As the Western Defense Command began circulating civilian exclusion orders, a new debate formed regarding Japanese Americans in the Territory of Hawaii. Stimson joined other officials to push for the exclusion of all "enemy alien" Japanese from the islands. (Japanese immigrants were prohibited by law from naturalization and so were classified as enemy aliens, regardless of their residential status.) However, Japanese Hawaiians were the largest ethnic group in the territory and the foundation of the Island's labor force. Since mass removal was infeasible both economically and politically, Stimson's proposal quickly fell through.

Although Stimson believed it to be "quite impossible" to determine the loyalty of Japanese Americans and eventually came to support the army's incarceration program, he remained unconvinced on the legality of the policy: "The second generation Japanese can only be evacuated either as part of a total evacuation, giving access to the areas only by permits, or by frankly trying to put them out on the ground that their racial characteristics are such that we cannot understand or trust even the citizen Japanese. The latter is the fact but I am afraid it will make a tremendous hole in our constitutional system."

Stimson authorized the release of Japanese Americans from camp in May 1944, but postponed permission for them to return to the West Coast until after the November elections to avoid controversy in Roosevelt's upcoming campaign.

=== General Patton ===
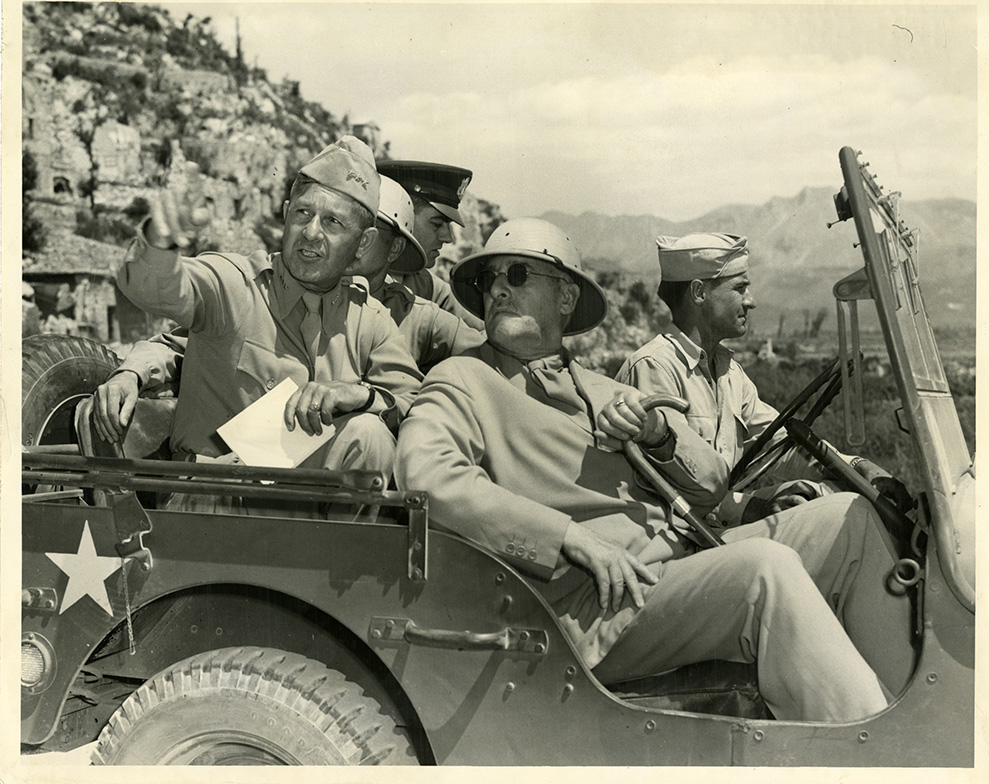
Lt. Gen. Jacob L. Devers pointing out landmarks at devastated Cassino to Secretary of War Henry L. Stimson touring the Italian battlefront

On November 21, 1943, the news broke that General George S. Patton, commander of the U.S. Seventh Army, had slapped an enlisted man who suffered from nervous exhaustion at a medical evacuation hospital in Sicily. The incident caused a storm of controversy, and members of Congress called for Patton to be relieved of command. General Dwight Eisenhower opposed any move to recall General Patton from the European Theater and said privately, "Patton is indispensable to the war effort – one of the guarantors of our victory." Stimson and McCloy agreed; Stimson told the Senate Patton would be retained because of the need for his "aggressive, winning leadership in the bitter battles which are to come before final victory."

=== Morgenthau Plan ===
Stimson strongly opposed the Morgenthau Plan to deindustrialize and to partition Germany into several smaller states. The plan also envisioned the deportation and the summary imprisonment of anybody suspected of responsibility for war crimes. Initially, Roosevelt had been sympathetic to the plan, but Stimson's opposition and the public outcry when the plan was leaked made Roosevelt backtrack. Stimson thus retained overall control of the U.S. occupation zone in Germany, and despite the plan's influence on the early occupation, it never became official policy.

Explaining his opposition to the plan, Stimson insisted to Roosevelt that 10 European countries, including Russia, depended upon German trade and its production of raw materials. He also stated that it was inconceivable that the "gift of nature," which was populated by peoples of "energy, vigor, and progressiveness," should be turned into a "ghost territory" or "dust heap."

What Stimson most feared, was that a subsistence-level economy would turn the anger of Germans against the Allies and thereby "obscure the guilt of the Nazis and the viciousness of their doctrines and their acts." Stimson pressed similar arguments on Harry S. Truman, when he became president, in the spring of 1945.

Stimson, a lawyer, insisted, against the initial wishes of both Roosevelt and British Prime Minister Winston Churchill, on proper judicial proceedings against leading war criminals. He and the War Department drafted the first proposals for an International Tribunal, which soon received backing from Truman. Stimson's plan eventually led to the Nuremberg Trials of 1945–1946, which have strongly influenced the development of international law.

=== Atomic bomb ===
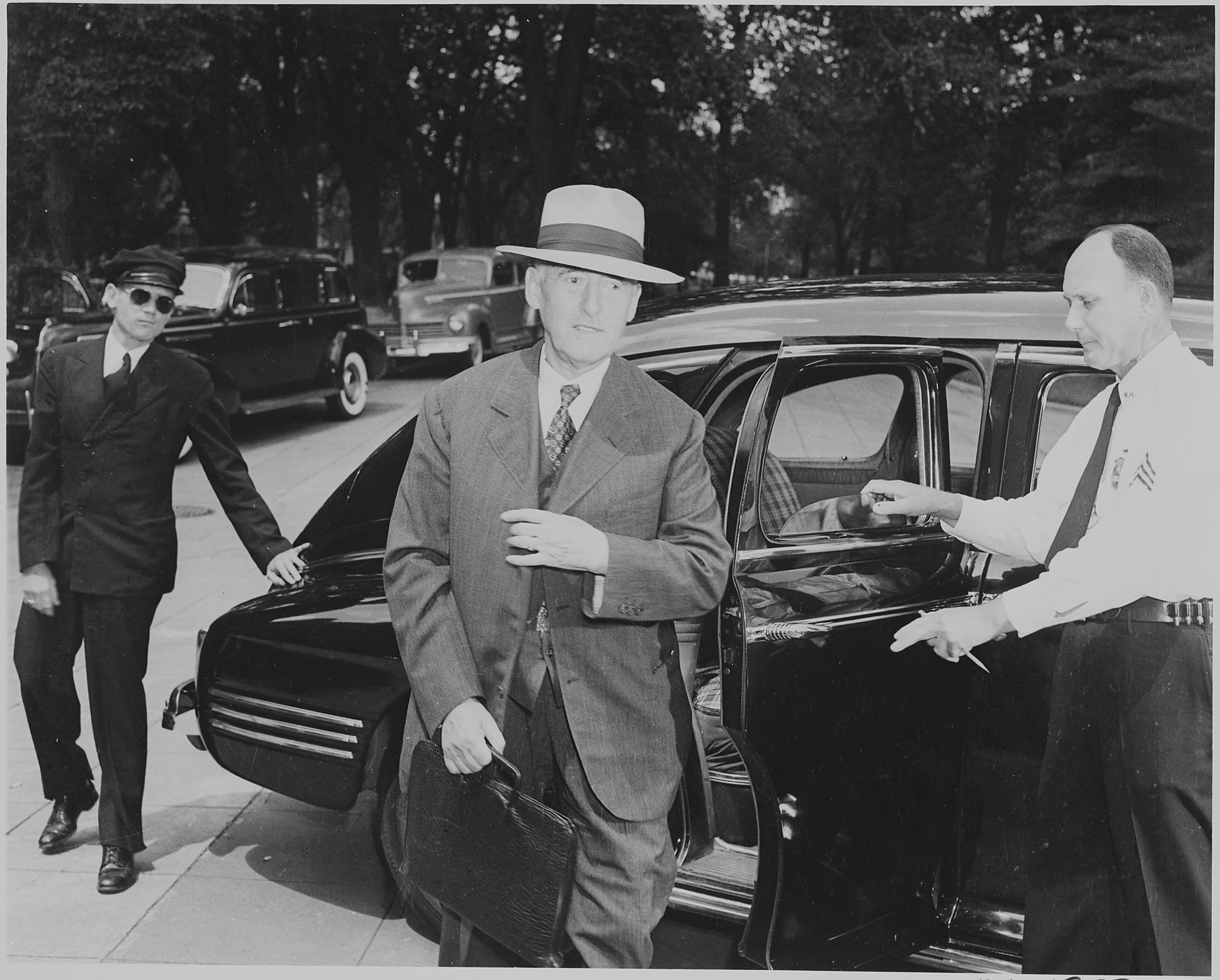
Stimson arriving for a Truman cabinet meeting in August 1945

As Secretary of War, Stimson took direct and personal control of the entire atomic bomb project, with immediate supervision over Major General Leslie Groves, the head of the Manhattan Project. Both Roosevelt and Truman followed Stimson's advice on every aspect of the bomb, and Stimson overruled military officers when they opposed his views.

One example of Stimson using his authority in this regard is an episode in which Stimson changed the list of potential targets for the first (and if necessary second) attacks on Japan using the new atomic bombs produced by the Manhattan Project. The original target list included the city of Kyoto, a place of immense cultural and historical significance to the Japanese people. While Kyoto may have satisfied the military criteria for a useful target, Stimson objected, declaring in a meeting of the Interim Committee on June 1, 1945, "...there was one city that they must not bomb without my permission and that was Kyoto."

Stimson's reasons for this decision have been obscured by popular myth. One well-traveled story is that Stimson didn't want to bomb Kyoto because he had spent his honeymoon there, and presumably had a nostalgic or sentimental attachment to the city. This anecdote comes from American diplomat and scholar Edwin O. Reischauer in My Life Between Japan and America (1986). There is no concrete evidence for this version of events, nor is there any record of Stimson ever expressing such a motive. Stimson did travel briefly to Kyoto in 1926, and spent a night there in 1929 as well, but both of these visits were more than 30 years after he and his wife married.

In his personal diary, Stimson recorded his concern that annihilating such an important cultural site could generate long-lasting hostility among the Japanese people, which could in turn make Japan more friendly to the Soviet Union. In July 1945, while attending the Potsdam conference between Truman, Churchill and Stalin, which took place only two weeks before the first atomic bomb was dropped, Stimson wrote:

I again gave [Truman] ...my reasons for eliminating one of the proposed targets. He again reiterated with the utmost emphasis his own concurrence on that subject, and he was particularly emphatic in agreeing with my suggestion that if elimination was not done, the bitterness which would be caused by such a wanton act might make it impossible during the long post-war period to reconcile the Japanese to us in that area rather than to the Russians.

The Manhattan Project was managed by Major General Groves (Corps of Engineers) with a staff of reservists and many thousands of civilian scientists and engineers. Groves nominally reported directly to General George Marshall, but it was Stimson who had the final word. Stimson secured the necessary money and approval from Roosevelt and from Congress, ensured that the Manhattan Project had the highest priorities, and controlled all plans for the use of the bomb. On August 6, Little Boy was dropped on Hiroshima within hours of its earliest possible availability, followed on August 9 by the dropping of Fat Man on Nagasaki. Japan announced its surrender to the Allies on August 15, six days after the latter bombing.

Stimson ultimately concluded that if the U.S. had guaranteed the Japanese preservation of the imperial constitutional monarchy, Japan might have surrendered earlier and prevented the use of atomic bombs. Historians debate whether the impact of a continued blockade, relentless bombing, and the Soviet Union's invasion of Manchuria would have forced Japanese Emperor Hirohito to surrender some time in late 1945 or early 1946, without the use of atomic bombs, but at the cost of massive Allied casualties.

After American journalist John Hersey's account of the Hiroshima atomic bombing became a media sensation, Stimson, chronicling "an exact description of [the] thoughts and actions as [he] found them in the records and in [his] clear recollection [on behalf of] all of those who had a share in [both atomic bombings]", in 1947 published his own article "The Decision to Use the Atomic Bomb" in Harper's Magazine. It argued the atomic bombings saved the Japanese from themselves, that demonstrating it would have been impractical, and American casualties from a potential invasion would exceed 1 million, although military documents from July 1945 estimated under 200,000 casualties (other estimates put the casualties as high as 4 million). Stimson also sidestepped questions such as the suffering of the victims and the radioactive qualities of the bombs, saying they had a "revolutionary character" or "unfamiliar nature". Because his article was the first official account of the reasonings behind the bombings, news outlets that were covering Hersey's Hiroshima began to cover Stimson's article instead. President Truman commended Stimson, and McGeorge Bundy, who had worked with Stimson on the article, later wrote, "We deserve some sort of medal."

=== Stimson's vision ===
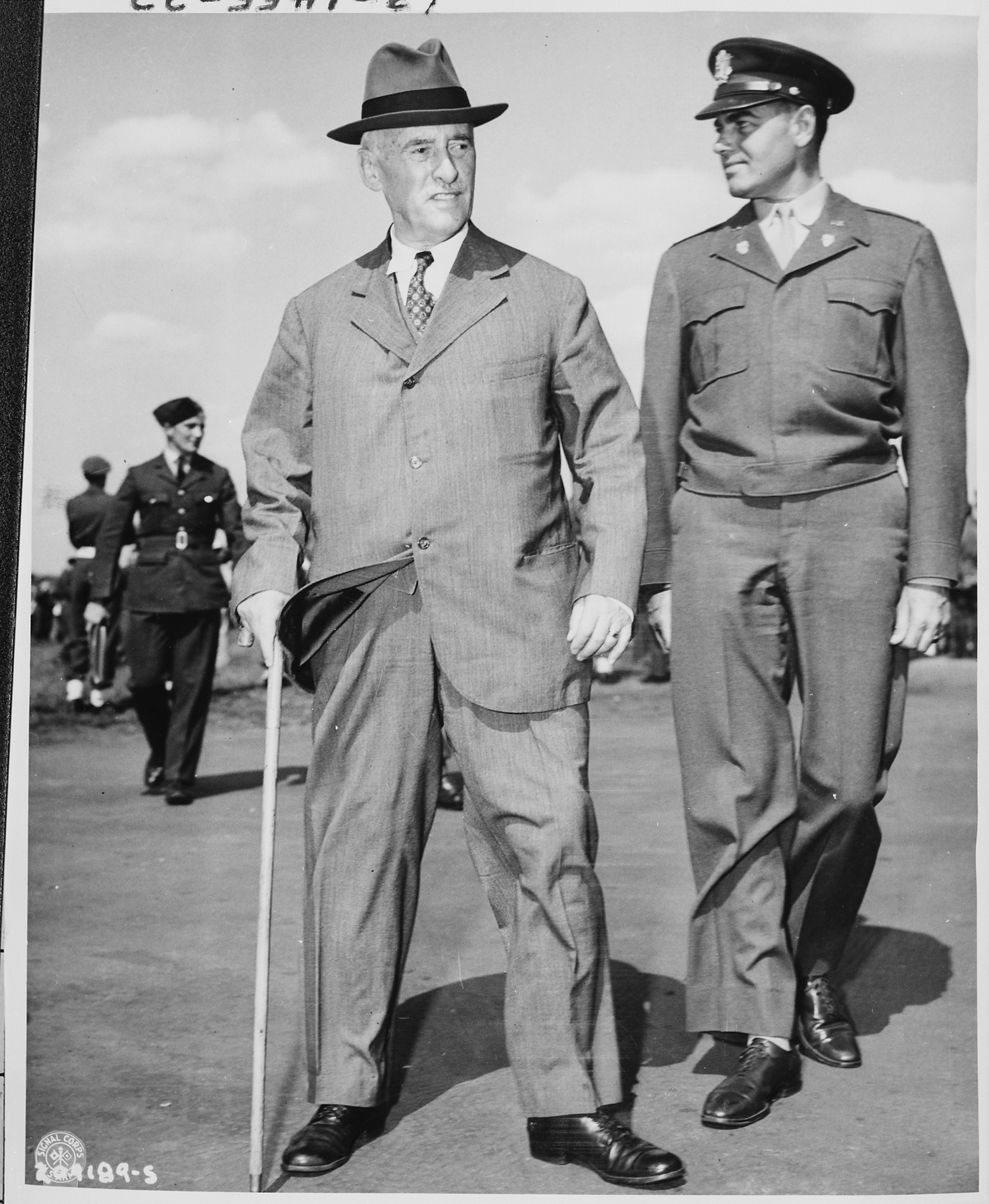
Stimson and Colonel William H. Kyle (right) arriving at the Gatow Airport in Berlin, Germany to attend the Potsdam Conference, July 16, 1945

Stimson looked beyond the immediate end of the war. He was the only top government official to try to predict the meaning of the Atomic Age, and he envisioned a new era in human affairs. For half-a-century, he had worked to inject order, science, and moralism into matters of law, state, and diplomacy. The impact of the atomic bomb, he thought, would go far beyond military concerns to encompass diplomacy, world affairs, business, economics, and science. Above all, Stimson stated that the "most terrible weapon ever known in human history" opened up "the opportunity to bring the world into a pattern in which the peace of the world and our civilization can be saved."

He thought the very destructiveness of the new weaponry would shatter the ages-old belief that wars could be advantageous. It might now be possible to call a halt to the use of destruction as a ready solution to human conflicts. Indeed, society's new control over the most elemental forces of nature finally "caps the climax of the race between man's growing technical power for destructiveness and his psychological power of self-control and group control—his moral power."

To this end, Stimson advocated collaboration with the Soviet Union and genuine international control of atomic technology and weaponry, including possibly turning them over to the United Nations. He was opposed in this by other members of the Truman administration like James Byrnes. Stimson's vision of such a new world order, shared in part by many atomic scientists as well as Albert Einstein, would have meant yielding some sovereignty to something akin to a world government.

In 1931, when Japan had invaded Manchuria, Stimson, as Secretary of State, proclaimed the Stimson Doctrine: no fruits of illegal aggression would ever be recognized by the United States. Although Japan ignored it, according to Stimson, the wheels of justice had now turned and the "peace-loving" nations, as Stimson called them, had the chance to punish Japan's misdeeds in a manner that would warn aggressor nations never again to invade their neighbors. To validate the new moral order, he believed that the atomic bomb had to be used against combatants and workers in the war. Hiroshima and Nagasaki had both contained combatant bases and major centers of war industry that employed tens of thousands of civilians.

The question for Stimson was not one of whether the weapon should be used. Involved were the simple issue of ending a horrible war and the more subtle and more important question of the possibility of genuine peace among nations. Stimson's decision involved the fate of mankind, and he posed the problem to the world in such clear and articulate fashion that there was a nearly-unanimous agreement mankind had to find a way so that atomic weapons would never be used again to kill people.

== Personal life ==
In July 1893, Stimson married the former Mabel Wellington White, a great-great-granddaughter of one of the Founding Fathers, Roger Sherman, and the sister of Elizabeth Selden Rogers. An adult case of mumps had left Stimson infertile, and they had no children.

== Later life ==
In the 1920s - 1940s, Stimson lived in Murray Hill, Manhattan.

Stimson officially announced his retirement on September 21, 1945. Afterwards, he wrote his memoirs with the aid of McGeorge Bundy. On Active Service in Peace and War was published by Harper in 1948 to critical acclaim. It is often cited by historians, as are the 170,000 typed pages of candid diaries that Stimson dictated at the end of every day. The diary is now in the Yale University Library; parts have been published in microfilm.

Two months after leaving office, in November 1945, Stimson suffered a heart attack from which he recovered, although he suffered a speech impediment. In the summer of 1950, Stimson fell and broke his leg. On October 20, one month after his 83rd birthday, he succumbed to complications from a second heart attack. Stimson died at his estate Highhold in Huntington, New York. He is buried in the adjacent town of Laurel Hollow, in the cemetery of St. John's Church. He was the last surviving member of William Howard Taft's cabinet.

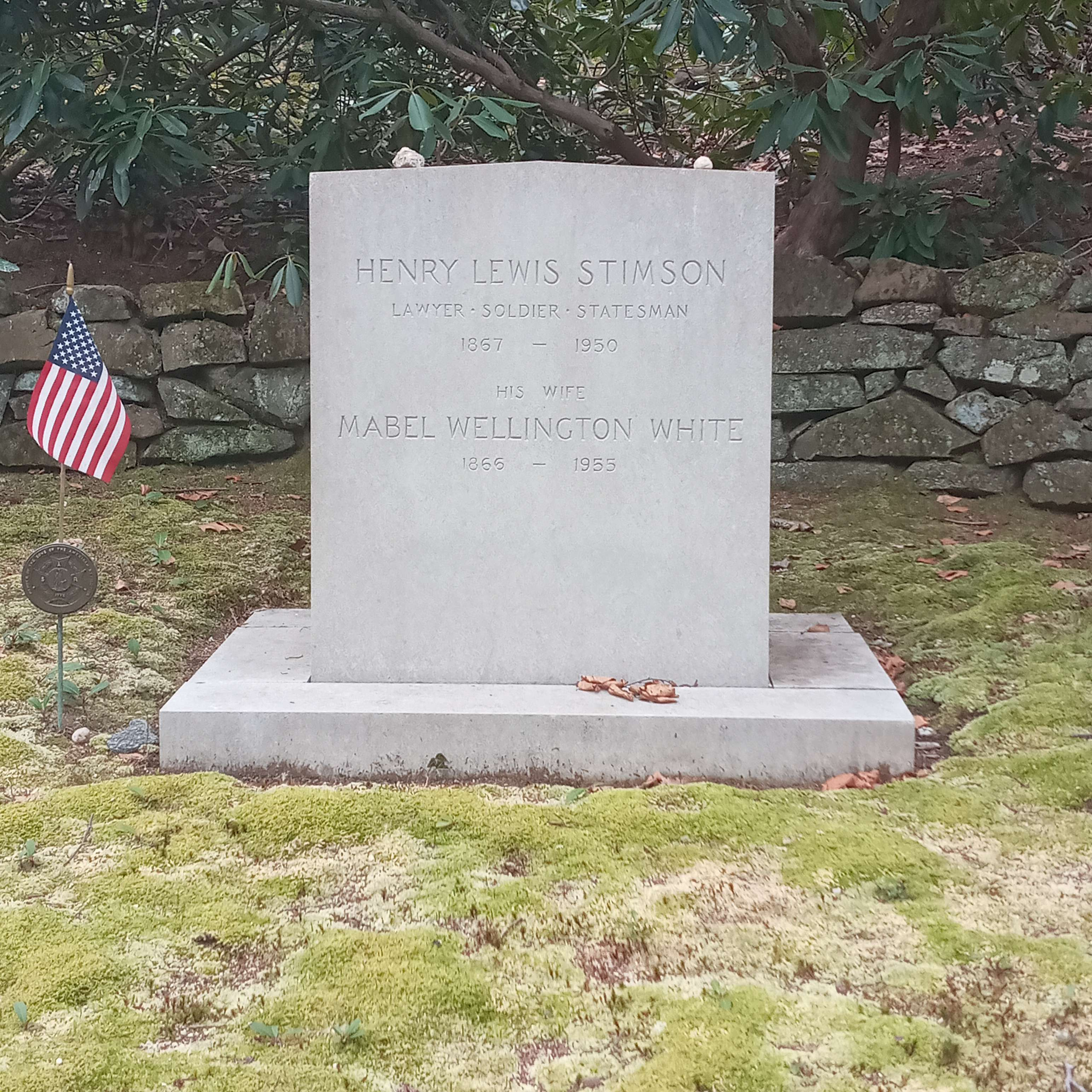
The gravesite of Secretary Stimson

== Anecdote ==
Theodore H. White noted that Stimson had known and served under more Presidents than any other American citizen of his era. According to White, a short time before Stimson died, he had been asked by a friend which of the many Presidents that he had been acquainted with "had been the best." After a few moments of reflection, Stimson indicated his answer to the query depended on what was meant by "the best." He said that if it meant the most efficient man to hold the office, the answer was William Howard Taft. If, however, the question meant the greatest president, the answer was "Roosevelt," but Stimson could not decide whether the first name would be Theodore or Franklin. Stimson said both "understood the use of power" but as well "knew the enjoyment of power."

== Awards ==
- Distinguished Service Medal (U.S. Army)
- World War I Victory Medal
- American Legion Distinguished Service Medal

== Legacy ==
Mount Stimson in Montana's Glacier National Park is named after Stimson, who in the 1890s hiked and assisted George Bird Grinnell in surveying the area and later supported creating the park.

The Henry L. Stimson Center, a private research institute in Washington, DC, advocates what it says is Stimson's "practical, non-partisan approach" to international relations.

The Benjamin Franklin-class ballistic missile submarine USS Henry L. Stimson (SSBN-655) was commissioned in 1966.

Stimson's name graces the Henry L. Stimson Middle School in Huntington Station, Long Island; a residential building on the campus of Stony Brook University; as well as a dorm at his alma mater Phillips Academy.

Stimson is also commemorated by the New York City Bar Association, where he served as president from 1937 to 1939, with the Henry L. Stimson Medal. The medal is awarded annually to outstanding Assistant U.S. Attorneys in the Southern and Eastern Districts of New York.

== In popular culture ==
Stimson has been portrayed in nearly a dozen movies and television shows about World War II and its aftermath, including Manhattan (2014–2015), Truman (1995), Truman at Potsdam (1995), Fat Man and Little Boy (1989), Day One (1989), War and Remembrance (1988), Race for the Bomb (1987), Churchill and the Generals (1981), Oppenheimer (1980), Oppenheimer (2023), Tora! Tora! Tora! (1970), and The Beginning or the End (1947).

In the alternate history short story "Truth, Justice, and the American Way" by Lawrence Watt-Evans contained in the 1992 alternate history anthology Alternate Presidents by Mike Resnick, Stimson succeeded Hoover (who defeated Roosevelt in 1932 after Al Smith ran as a third party candidate and split the Democratic vote) as president in 1936, defeating Roosevelt. He once again defeated Roosevelt in 1940.

== See also ==
- List of Harvard University politicians
- List of U.S. political appointments that crossed party lines

Party political offices
Preceded by Charles Evans Hughes	Republican nominee for Governor of New York; 1910	Succeeded by Job E. Hedges
Political offices
Preceded by Jacob M. Dickinson	United States Secretary of War; 1911–1913	Succeeded by Lindley Miller Garrison
Preceded by Leonard Wood; Acting	Governor-General of the Philippines; 1927–1929	Succeeded by Eugene Allen Gilmore; Acting
Preceded by Frank B. Kellogg	United States Secretary of State; 1929–1933	Succeeded by Cordell Hull
Preceded by Harry H. Woodring	United States Secretary of War; 1940–1945	Succeeded by Robert P. Patterson
