= Alfred Lebbeus Loomis =

American physician (1831–1895)

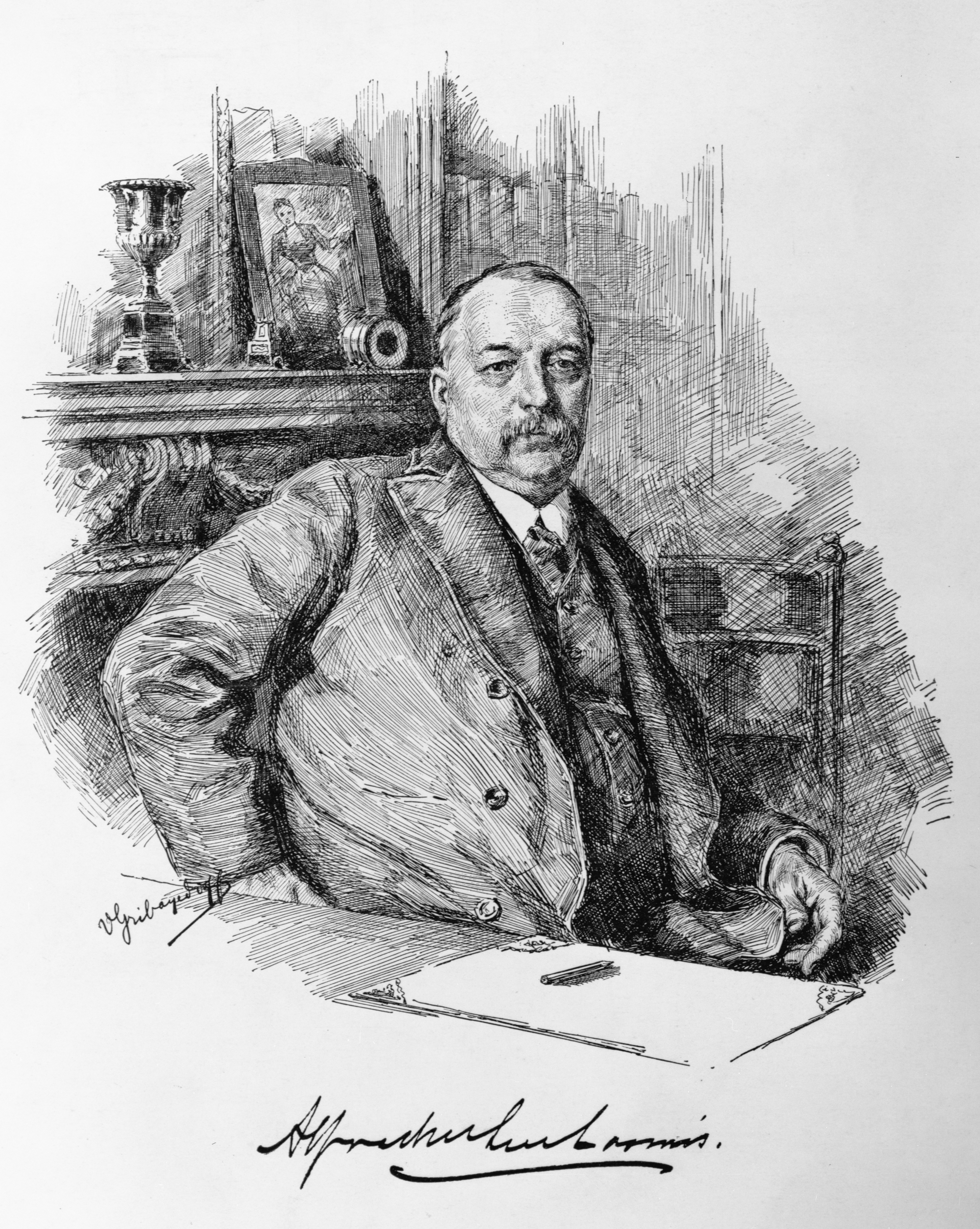
Alfred Lebbeus Loomis

Alfred Lebbeus Loomis (October 16, 1831 – January 23, 1895) was an American physician who served as president of the Association of American Physicians.

== Life and career ==
Loomis was born in Bennington, Vermont. He graduated from Union College in 1851, studied medicine at the College of Physicians and Surgeons, New York (now Columbia University College of Physicians and Surgeons), and graduated in 1853 with an M.D. and again Union College with an A.M. At this time, the science of auscultation and percussion was developing very rapidly, and this circumstance led him to adopt diseases of the lungs and heart as his specialty. He was appointed visiting physician to Bellevue Hospital in 1859, and became lecturer on physical diagnosis at the College of Physicians and Surgeons in 1862.

Shortly after this Loomis's health broke down completely, and he spent six months in the Adirondacks. The benefit derived from his residence there led to the establishment, years later, of Dr. Edward Livingston Trudeau's Adirondack Cottage Sanitarium at Saranac, and also, at Liberty, Sullivan County, New York, of a Hospital for Consumptives.

In 1866, Loomis became professor of the theory and practice of medicine at the University of the City of New York, the medical department of which later became University and Bellevue Hospital Medical College. Loomis was appointed visiting physician to Mount Sinai Hospital in 1874.

He was president of the New York Academy of Medicine in 1889–90 and again in 1891–92; and in 1893 served as president of the Association of American Physicians. He published Lessons in Physical Diagnosis (1868; 11th edition, revised and enlarged, 1899); Lectures on Fevers (1877); A Text-Book of Practical Medicine (1884). He was, in addition, editor of An American System of Medicine (1894).

Loomis died at home, aged 63, in New York City on January 23, 1895.

== Term ==
- Loomis' mixture – a diarrhea mixture containing oil of sassafras I, tincture of opium 12, tincture of rhubarb 8, tincture of gambir 40, compound tincture of lavender to make 100. Dose, 30 minims (2cc). The American Illustrated Medical Dictionary (1938)
