= Caroline Townsend =

American designer and embroiderer

- Born: 1854; Albany, New York
- Died: 1889 (aged 34–35)
- Known for: Embroidery

Caroline Townsend (1854–1889) was an American designer and embroiderer, best known for her design work at Tiffany & Co. and as the principal designer at Associated Artists.

== Early life ==
Caroline Townsend was born in Albany, NY. In 1880, she left home to teach watercolor and china painting at the Hartford, Connecticut branch of the Society of Decorative Art. She taught in Hartford for a year before moving on to New York City.

== Career ==
In May 1881, Townsend's portière won the $500 first place prize at an embroidery competition held by the Society of Decorative Art at the American Art Gallery at Madison Square.

Through the exhibition of her textiles at the Society, Townsend would have met Candace Wheeler and begin working with her at Associated Artists, which, in turn, led to her collaborating with Louis C. Tiffany & Company.

Townsend would eventually go on to lead a small collective of women in Farmington, Connecticut and teach them needlepoint. This collective submitted a portière to the Pedestal Fund Art Loan Exhibition. After eventually leaving Associated Artists, Townsend would study painting at the Académie Julian in Paris and the Art Students League of New York.

Townsend died abruptly in 1889, one year after marrying Winthrop Scudder.

=== Style ===
Townsend often embroidered flowers which exhibited a surprising deepness for needlework. Her floral designs suggest an influence from the William Morris and the Royal School of Art Needlework. Her technique of using various stitches and colors to create the illusion of depth suggests an influence from Wheeler.

=== Reception ===
Townsend has won great praise from critics and her contemporaries alike.

In describing her top prize winning portière at 1881 Society of Decorative Art competition, Harper's Bazaar wrote:

The effect was that of looking through an open window at a magnificent jar of branching roses standing on the ledge. The frame-work of the window is represented by a peculiar and indescribable shade of olive plush... The large jar, from whose mouth the rose branches droop, is cut out of a gold and red Japanese brocade, and is sewed to the cream white satin on which the roses are worked. The roses themselves are exquisitely and lavishly wrought in every shade, from pure white to the rich red of the Jacqueminot and the clear yellow of the Marshal Niel. The curtain is a remarkable piece of needle-work to have been executed in so short a time by a single hand.

— Harper's Bazaar

Louis C. Tiffany wrote that Townsend unscrupulously used every stitch possible to replicate painterly effects of color and shading in needlework.

Candace Wheeler described Townsend as one of the best embroiderers she has known.

== Work ==
=== Awards and nominations ===
First Prize, design for portière, Society of Decorative Art, May 1881.
