= Candace Wheeler =

American interior designer (1827–1923)

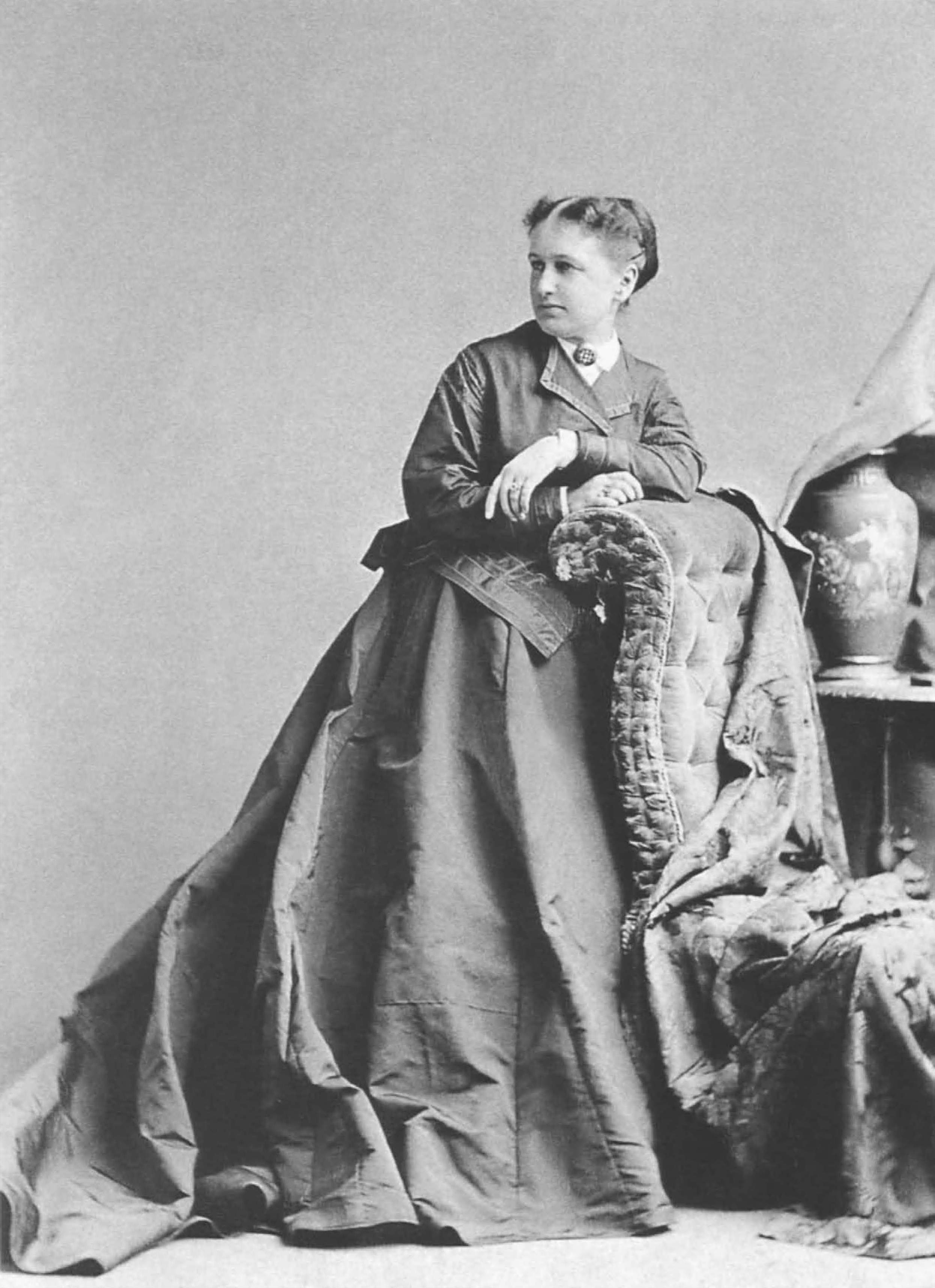
- Born: Candace Thurber; March 27, 1827; Delhi, New York, U.S.
- Died: August 5, 1923 (aged 96)
- Education: Delaware Academy
- Occupation: Interior decorator
- Spouse: Thomas Mason Wheeler
- Children: 4, including Dora Wheeler Keith
- Parent(s): Abner Gilman Thurber; Lucy Dunham
- Relatives: Henry L. Stimson (grandson); Candace Thurber Stevenson (niece)

Candace Wheeler (née Thurber; March 24, 1827 – August 5, 1923) was an American interior and textile designer. Traditionally credited as the mother of interior design, she was one of the first women to work as an interior designer in the United States and was a leading authority on home decoration in the 19th century.

Wheeler helped open the field of interior design to women, supported craftswomen, and promoted American design reform. A committed feminist, she intentionally employed women and encouraged their education, especially in the fine and applied arts, and fostered home industries for rural women. She also did editorial work and wrote several books and many articles, encompassing fiction, semi-fiction and non-fiction, for adults and children.

She was a co-founder of the Society of Decorative Art in New York City (1877) and the New York Exchange for Women's Work (1878), and her own firm, The Associated Artists (1883–1907). Louis Comfort Tiffany was a frequent collaborator, specializing in textiles (1879–1883).

Throughout her career Wheeler contributed to the Colonial Revival, the Aesthetic Movement and the Arts and Crafts Movement, and also designed the interior of the Women's Building at the 1893 World's Columbian Exposition in Chicago.

== Biography ==
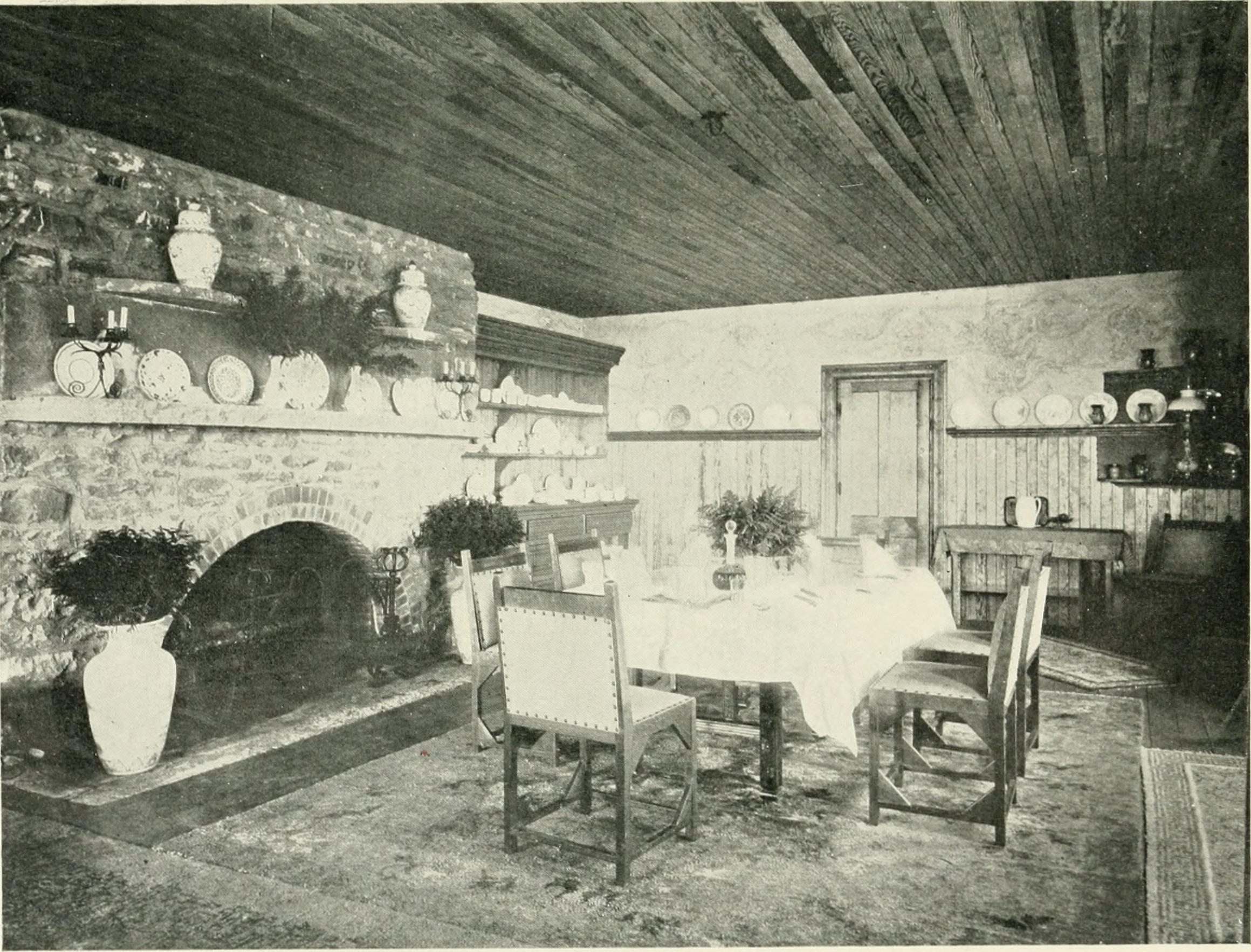
Principles of home decoration, with practical examples, Candace Wheeler, 1903

Candace Wheeler was born Candace Thurber on March 24, 1827, in Delhi, New York, west of the Catskill Mountains, but spent her first seven years in Oswego, New York, on Lake Ontario. Her parents were Abner Gilman Thurber (1797–1860) and Lucy (née Dunham) Thurber (1800–1892). Candace was the third born of eight siblings: Lydia Ann Thurber (1824-?), Charles Stewart Thurber (1826–1888), Horace Thurber (1828–1899), Lucy Thurber (1834–1893), Millicent Thurber (1837–1838), Abner Dunham Thurber (1839–1899), and Francis Beattie Thurber (1842–1907).

Wheeler had a happy a childhood, though she expressed annoyance at how their father raised them "a hundred years behind the time." Abner was strictly Presbyterian but also a strict abolitionist. He ensured that the family never used any product made by slaves: the family used homemade maple sugar instead of cane sugar and linen woven from flax they grew on their farm instead of southern cotton. Looking back, Candace was convinced their farm had been a stop on the Underground Railroad. Abner also loved nature and poetry, and shared these passions with Candace, a kindred spirit. Candace attended an "infant school" in Oswego, where at age six she stitched her first sampler. On return to Delhi she attended and graduated from the Delaware Academy.

On a trip to New York City in 1843, Candace met Thomas Mason Wheeler (1818–1895). Relatively well educated and interested in the arts, he had been a surveyor in the developing Midwest. He was the brother of the Thurbers' minister's wife, whom Candace admired as the first "cultivated" person she had known. Within a year, Tom and Candace married: he was 26, she 17. Candace's marriage and relocation to New York City upended her constrained, rural life. Tom worked for Candace's brothers' wholesale grocery business, then became a "weigher", transferring shipments in the port of New York, and eventually an owner of warehouses in Brooklyn, the Atlantic Docks, a lucrative business during the Civil War.

The couple had four children:

- Candace Thurber Wheeler (1845–1876). She was married to Lewis Atterbury Stimson (1844–1917), with who she had one son, Henry L. Stimson, who became a prominent politician. Thurber Wheeler died at the age of 31, which traumatized her mother.
- James Cooper Wheeler (1849–1912). He married Annie Morris Robinson on October 4, 1878, with whom he had one child, Candace. He moved to Australia in 1887, abandoning his family. Their marriage was annulled in 1892. He later moved to Washington State and worked as a journalist and writer. In 1894 he married Zoe Seger, with whom he had three children. Jim wrote There She Blows! A Whaling Yarn (1909), followed by a series of books for boys set in the Pacific Northwest, and several stories and articles. He and his daughter Candace died in Denver in 1912.
- Dora Wheeler (1856–1940). She was married to Boudinot Keith (1859–1925), a lawyer, with whom she had two children.who As an artist she ollaborated with her mother at the Associated Artists, at the Chicago World's Columbian Exposition, and as book designer and illustrator.
- Dunham Wheeler (1861–1938). He married Anne Quartley, who was employed at the Associated Artists, with whom he had one child. He worked as an architect and designer, and was president of Associated Artists from 1900 until it failed in 1907.

Wheeler died on August 5, 1923, at the age of 96.

== Career ==
=== The American Grocer ===
Wheeler's first professional activity was writing for the American Grocer, a trade publication owned by her wholesale-grocer brothers, when edited by her husband Tom in 1874. The following year she created the "Home Department" for that journal, a pull-out section for grocers' wives and children, which she edited and to which she continued to contribute articles and semi-fiction based on her experiences to date. She hired both her son Jim, who would become a journalist and author, to write stories that reflected his stint as a mariner in the South Pacific, and her sister Lu to write articles about homemaking and home decoration, as well as humorous satires evoking their older relatives, exploiting the rural/urban tensions of the time.

=== Philadelphia Centennial ===
In 1876, Wheeler visited the Philadelphia Centennial Exposition. She was impressed by the Royal School of Art Needlework's elaborate display, including designs by her favorite designer, Walter Crane, as well as by an exhibit of more practical items embroidered by English women. which inspired her to create an American version of the Royal School that would include "all articles of feminine manufacture" to help "educated" but impoverished women. Years later, in a letter to her niece, Wheeler described herself as "jumping at the possibility of work for the army of helpless women of N.Y. who were ashamed to beg & untrained to work."

=== Society of Decorative Art in New York ===
Wheeler co-founded the Society of Decorative Art with Caroline E. Lamson (Mrs. David) Lane in New York in 1877. She hired the recently widowed Elizabeth Bacon (Mrs. General George Armstrong) Custer as secretary: the two women became friends. The Society was intended to help women support themselves through artistic handicrafts including needlework and other decorative arts. It served the thousands of women who were left indigent at the end of the Civil War. Wheeler called on prominent New York society matrons to support a shop in which the high-quality, custom-made goods could be sold to produce income; they had five hundred subscribers within three years.

Leading artists were hired to teach or judge exhibits at the Society in New York, including Louis Comfort Tiffany and John La Farge. Wheeler helped to start branches in Chicago, St. Louis, Hartford, Detroit, Troy, New York and Charleston, South Carolina. Although her relationship with the Society became strained, she remained supportive for the next several years.

=== New York Exchange for Women's Work ===
In 1878 Wheeler helped launch the New York Exchange for Women's Work, where women could sell any product that they could manufacture at home, including baked goods and household linens. To serve a broader range of women, no artistic ability was required. The Exchange opened in March 1878 with a consignment sale of thirty items at the home of Exchange co-founder Mary Atwater Choate. In April, the Exchange moved to a rented facility and had achieved success within a few months. In its first year, it paid out nearly $14,000 in commissions, and by 1891, there were at least 72 Exchanges across the United States. The New York Exchange continued to operate until 2003.

=== Tiffany & Wheeler ===
In 1879, Candace Wheeler and Louis Comfort Tiffany co-founded the interior-decorating firm of Tiffany & Wheeler, with Wheeler responsible for textiles. Soon they were joined by William Pringle Mitchell and Lockwood de Forest to became Louis Comfort Tiffany, Associated Artists.

The firm decorated a number of significant late-19th-century houses and public buildings, including the Veterans’ Room of the Seventh Regiment Armory, the Madison Square Theatre, the Union League Club, the George Kemp house, the drawing room of the Cornelius Vanderbilt II house, and rooms of the White House in Washington, D.C. In 1882, the firm was contracted to renovate on several rooms in the White House, including the Blue Room, Red Room, East Room, State Dining Room, and Entrance Hall. One of Wheeler's award-winning work, known as "Honeybee", was incorporated into this project. The firm also designed the main spaces of the extant Mark Twain House in West Hartford, Connecticut.

=== Associated Artists ===
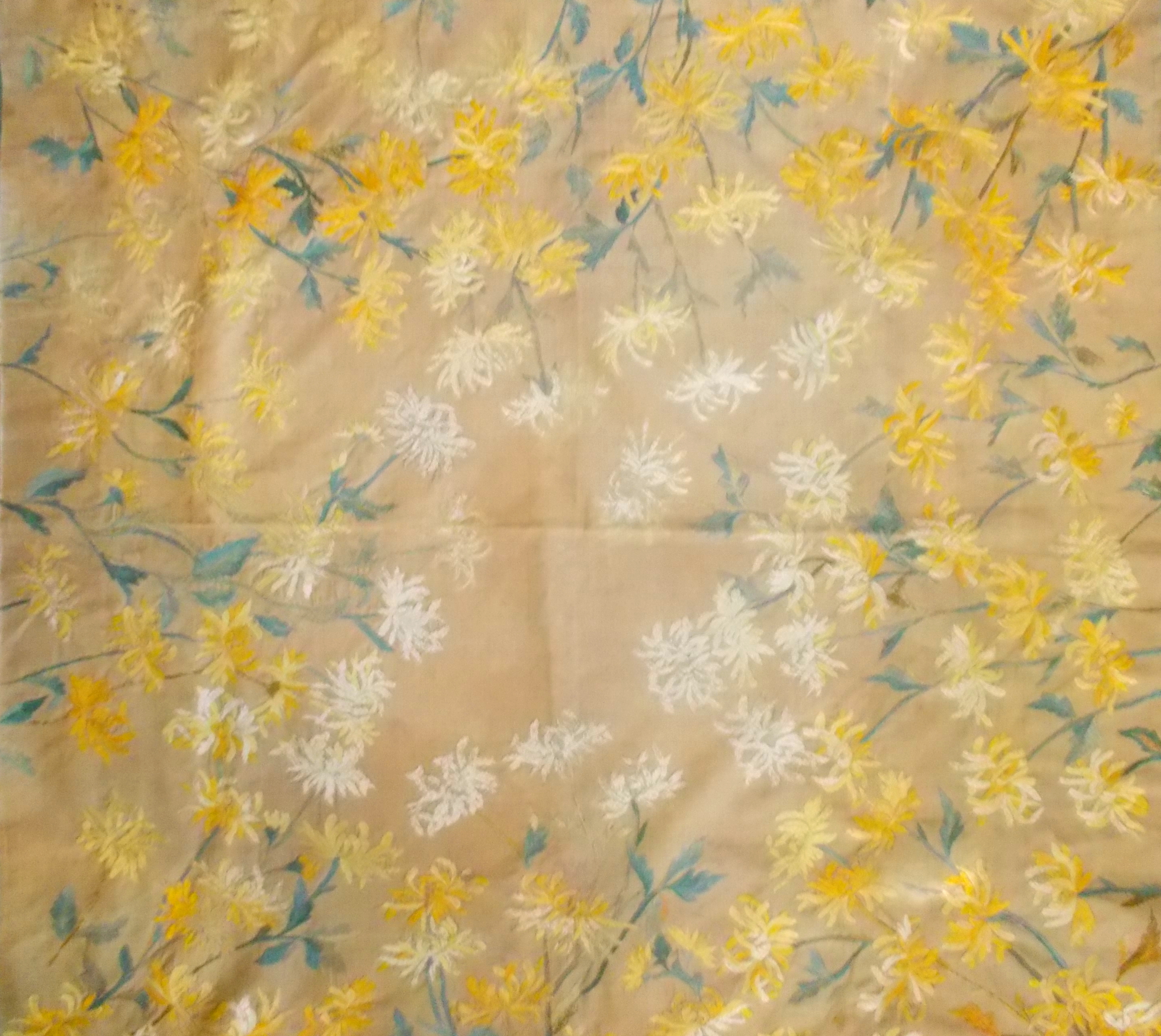
Associated Artists embroidered card table cover, 44" x 44", silk thread embroidery on cloth, circa 1900

In 1883 Wheeler formed her own firm, called Associated Artists, which specialized in textiles and mainly hired women. They produced a wide range of goods including tapestries and theater drop curtains. The Associated Artists was particularly well known for its "changeable" silks, their iridescence produced by interweaving differently colored threads seen in varying angles and lights.

Wealthy customers could purchase custom designs. Andrew Carnegie commissioned a Scotch thistle damask. Lillie Langtry ordered a pair of rose-themed portieres for her bedroom that were coordinated with a transparent silk bed canopy embroidered with roses from which embroidered petals appeared to have dropped onto the bedcover—an innovation of Wheelers.

Between 1884 and 1894, the Cheney Brothers mills of Manchester, Connecticut, turned out more than 500 silk fabrics designed by The Associated Artists in a range of prices that were sold throughout the United States. Wheeler also created less expensive products for a wider audience with machine-ready patterns for denim and other cottons. Her designs were based on local plant forms.

The Associated Artists' signature needle-woven tapestry was a combination of loom weaving and handwork that Wheeler had invented and patented in 1881. The technique made the stitches practically invisible to create a smooth surfaced tapestry.

=== Onteora ===
One of Wheeler's touted achievements was the creation of a vacation community in the Catskills, Onteora, still ongoing. In 1883 she and her wealthy brother Frank (Francis Beattie Thurber) selected elevated land with extensive views near Tannersville, New York, on which to build two summer houses for their respective families. By 1887 Wheeler and her sister-in-law, Jeannette Thurber, decided to expand and develop their property as a vacation community of like-minded people dedicated to the arts. Wheeler commissioned her son Dunham, then a fledgling architect, to design several of the early buildings). The Associated Artists designed the interiors. Wheeler expanded her house Pennyroyal (actually owned by Dora) over the years, and cultivated a garden which became the subject of her book, Content in a Garden (1901). Onteora eventually comprised two thousand acres of land.

=== World's Columbian Exposition ===
In 1893, at the age of 66, Wheeler agreed to take charge of the interior of the Woman's Building at the Chicago World's Fair, and to organize the State of New York's applied arts exhibition there. The Woman's Building was overseen by Bertha Palmer and designed by architect Sophia Hayden. Artists featured in the Woman's Building included Alice Rideout, Mary Cassatt, Rosina Emmet Sherwood, Amanda Brewster Sewell, Lydia Field Emmet, Marie Herndl, and Wheeler's daughter Dora Wheeler Keith. The building was filled with exhibitions of women's fine arts, crafts, industrial products and regional and other specialties from around the world. She wrote an article on the Exposition for Harper's Monthly in 1893, called "A Dream City".

=== Later life ===
In 1909 Wheeler built a winter home in Thomasville, Georgia, adjacent to that of her friend Janet Chase Hoyt. Wheeler spent much of her later life there and at Onteora, writing books and articles on decorating and the textile arts, as well as fiction and poetry. She published her last book in 1921.

=== Books ===
- Prize Painting Book: Good Times. (New York: White & Stokes, 1881)
- Household Art. (New York: Harper & Brothers, 1893)
- Content in a Garden. (New York: Houghton Mifflin and Company, 1901)
- How to Make Rugs. (New York: Doubleday, Page & Company, 1902)
- Principles of Home Decoration. (New York: Doubleday, Page & Company,1903)
- Doubledarling and the Dreamspinner. (New York: Fox, Duffield & Company, 1905)
- The Annals of Onteora: 1887–1914. (New York: E.W. Whitfield, 1914)
- Yesterdays in a Busy Life. (New York: Harper & Brothers, 1918)
- The Development of Embroidery in America. (New York: Harper & Brothers, 1921)
