= Candace Thurber Stevenson =

American writer

- Stevenson, from the 1904 yearbook of Smith College
- Born: September 7, 1882; Brooklyn, New York, U.S.
- Died: July 30, 1968 (aged 85); South Shaftsbury, Vermont, U.S.
- Occupation: Writer
- Relatives: Candace Wheeler (aunt); Dora Wheeler Keith (cousin); Henry L. Stimson (cousin)

Candace F. Thurber Stevenson (September 7, 1882 – July 30, 1968) was an America writer. Her work appeared in The New York Times, Prairie Schooner, and other publications, including one collection of her poetry, First the Blade (1952).

== Early life and education ==
Thurber was born in Brooklyn, New York, the daughter of Abner Dunham Thurber and Annie Ford Thurber. She shared a name with her aunt, the noted interior designer and writer Candace Thurber Wheeler. Her cousins included artist Dora Wheeler Keith and statesman Henry L. Stimson. She graduated from Smith College in 1904, and earned a master's degree from Columbia University.

== Career ==
Thurber taught English and co-owned a bookstore as a young woman. She also wrote and spoke about the Bureau of Occupation, a Smith College job placement program for women with college degrees.

Stevenson's poetry was often free verse and focused on themes of rural life in America, and the changes brought the twentieth century, including the atomic bomb. "Delicate, sensitive perceptions, and voicing of deep if evanescent emotions, are characteristic of many of the poems," noted a 1952 reviewer of Stevenson's poetry collection, First the Blade. She also wrote short stories. She was active in clubwork in Westchester County, including the Smith College alumnae club and the League of Women Voters.

== Publications ==
- "College Beggars" (1902, essay, Smith College Monthly)
- "Finding Jobs for Educated Women" (1911, article)
- "The Ballet of the Roof-tops" (1916, poem, The Century)
- "Castles" (1923, poem)
- "Art and Friendship" (1943, poem)
- "Old Ladies" (1950, poem, Saturday Review)
- "Night Broadcast" (1951, poem)
- First the Blade (1952, poetry collection), includes "Signatures", "Abstract of Battleship", "Land Hunger", "Night Express" and "After Renoir"
- "Child to Woman" (1954, poem, Ladies' Home Journal)
- "Music Box" (1955, poem, Ladies' Home Journal)
- "Well Preserved" (1956, poem, Saturday Review)

== Personal life ==
Thurber married Thomas Kennedy Stevenson in 1912; they had a daughter. Stevenson died in 1968, at the age of 85, at her home in South Shaftsbury, Vermont. Her grave is in Green-Wood Cemetery. There is a collection of her papers, including correspondence and manuscripts, at Smith College.
