= Mary Dow Brine =

American poet and children's author (c. 1835–1925)

Mary Dow Brine (1835 or 1836 – July 20, 1925) was an American poet, children's author, and lyricist. A prolific writer of children's literature during the late nineteenth century, she published more than fifty books of poetry and stories. She is best known for the poem "Somebody's Mother", which was widely reprinted. Her 1881 book My Boy and I; or, On the Road to Slumberland, illustrated by Dora Wheeler, was one of the few books published by Louis Comfort Tiffany. Brine also wrote the poem "Marguerite", which was later used as the lyrics to the popular song "Hearts and Flowers".

== Early life ==
Brine's birthdate is unknown. Her 1925 obituary noted her age as 89, which would place her birth in 1835 or 1836. She was born Mary Dow Northam in New York City to William Langley and Caroline A. (Dow) Northam. She had two sisters, Lucia Anna Northam and Caroline Augusta Northam, an illustrator of children's books, whose work appears alongside Brine's from time to time.

== Career ==
=== Children's literature ===
Brine was a prolific author, publishing over 50 titles in her career. In 1876, the American Tract Society published her children's book What Robbie Was Good For. Her 1881 My Boy and I; or, On the Road to Slumberland, illustrated by Dora Wheeler, was one of the few books published by Louis Comfort Tiffany. Her final book, Mother's Little Man, was published in 1906.

=== Poems ===
"Somebody's Mother", Brine's best-known poem, was originally published in Madge, the Violet Girl, and Other Poems (1881). The poem was widely distributed and appeared in school textbooks and newspapers, sometimes without attribution to Brine. Folklorist Pauline Greenhill notes that "An Act of Kindness," a poem by David Weir of York, Ontario, "takes its inspiration, as well as nearly half its lines, from "Somebody's Mother." Although Brine's poetry was often sentimental, contemporary writer Kate Sanborn included her among American women humorists. Sanborn's The Wit of Women (1895) reprinted two of Brine's poems, "Kiss Pretty Poll" and "Thanksgiving Day—Then and Now."

=== Music ===
Brine played a number of musical instruments. She also composed music and wrote lyrics. Brine wrote the lyrics to "Sweetest", a ballad and chorus with music by H. P. Danks. "Hearts and Flowers" (1893) is the most well-known song associated with Brine. Its lyrics were taken from the first three stanzas of her poem "Marguerite". This poem appeared in two of her poetry collections: From Gold To Grey (1886) and Memories of Home (1890). Scholar Dennis Loranger notes that the song reflects the Victorian ideal of women as innocent, domestic, and harmonious with nature. He interprets Marguerite's blushing in the song as a sign of purity.

== Personal life ==
Brine married William Brine at St. Peter’s Church, Brooklyn on June 19, 1862. The couple had one daughter, Carrie Lousie Brine. Mary Dow Brine died on July 20, 1925 in New York City.

== Bibliography ==
- What Robbie Was Good For. New York: American Tract Society. 1876.
- Bessie the Cash Girl. New York and Cincinnati: Nelson & Phillips; Hitchcock & Walden. 1878.
- Midget's Baby and Other Stories. With Nora Perry. Boston: D. Lothrop and Company. 1878.
- Madge, the Violet Girl, and Other Poems. New York: George W. Harlan. 1881.
- My Boy and I; or, On the Road to Slumberland. Cambridge, Massachusetts: J. Wilson and Son. c. 1881.
- Grandma's Attic Treasures: A Story of Old-Time Memories. New York: E. P. Dutton and Co.; London: Griffith and Farran. 1882.
- Jack; or, For Mamma's Sake. New York: American Tract Society. 1882.
- Papa's Little Daughters. New York, London and Paris: Cassell, Petter, Galpin & Co. 1882.
- Jingles and Joys for Wee Girls and Boys. New York, London and Paris: Cassell & Company. c. 1883.
- Four Little Friends; or, Papa's Daughters in Town. New York: Cassell & Company. 1883.
- Darling Portraits and Household Pets. New York: E. P. Dutton and Company. 1884.
- Hither and Thither; or, Good Times for Papa's Little Daughters. New York: Cassell & Company. 1884.
- The Home Concert. New York: Cassell & Company. 1885.
- A Mother's Song. New York: Cassell & Company. 1886.
- Christmas Dreams. New York: Cassell & Company. 1886.
- Ding Dong Bell. New York: Cassell & Company. 1886.
- From Gold to Grey: Being Poems and Pictures of Life and Nature. New York, London, Paris and Melbourne: Cassell & Company. 1886.
- The Merry Go-Round for All Girls and Boys. New York: Cassell & Company. 1886.
- The Stories Grandma Told. New York: Cassell & Company. 1886.
- A Wish for Christmas and the New Year. New York. 1886.
- A Dozen and One; or, The Boys and Girls of Polly's Ring. New York, London, Paris and Melbourne: Cassell & Company. 1887.
- Good Times for the Little Ones. New York, London, Paris and Melbourne: Cassell & Company. 1887.
- Twilight Fancies for Our Young Folks. New York, London, Paris and Melbourne: Cassell & Company. 1887.
- Uncle Amos and His Christmas Gifts. New York: T. E. D. Darling. 1887.
- The Boys and Girls of Marble Dale. New York: Cassell & Company. 1888.
- Echoes from Storyland. New York: Cassell & Company. 1888.
- Grandma's Memories. Illustrated by R. A. Bell, A. W. Parsons and Walter Paget. New York: E. P. Dutton and Company. 1888.
- Bonnie Little Bonibel and Her Day Off: A Story. Illustrated by A. G. Plympton. New York: E. P. Dutton and Company. 1890.
- Christmas in Baby-Land. With other American authors. New York: Cassell Publishing Company. 1890.
- Christmas Rhymes and New Year's Chimes. London. 1890.
- Effie's Birthday Present. New York: American Tract Society. 1890.
- Love, Home, and Mother: The Book for Our Darlings. Chicago and Philadelphia: Louis Benham & Co. 1890.
- Memories of Home: Poems and Pictures of Life and Nature. New York: Cassell Publishing Company. 1890.
- Nellie's Dream and Other Stories. New York: American Tract Society. 1890.
- Rhymes and Chimes for Christmas Times. New York: Cassell Publishing Company. 1890.
- Shadow and Sunshine—and Jerry. New York: American Tract Society. 1890.
- The Story of Tom. New York: American Tract Society. 1890.
- The Little New Neighbor. Illustrated by Almira George Plympton. New York: E. P. Dutton and Company. 1891.
- My Little Margaret: A Story. Illustrated by Almira George Plympton. New York: E. P. Dutton and Company. 1891.
- Thoughts and Fancies: Poems and Pictures of Life and Nature. New York: Cassell Publishing Company. 1891.
- Dan: A Story for Boys. Illustrated by Almira George Plympton. New York: E. P. Dutton and Company. 1892.
- The Little Twin Roses: A Story for Little Girls and Boys. New York: E. P. Dutton and Company. 1892.
- Little Miss Toddledums: A Story for the Nursery. Illustrated by Florence Kate Upton. New York: E. P. Dutton and Company. 1893.
- The Story of Aunt Patience. New York: E. P. Dutton. 1893.
- Margaret Arnold's Christmas and Other Stories. New York: E. P. Dutton & Company. 1894.
- Stories for Children. New York: E. P. Dutton and Company. 1894.
- Bessie and Bee. New York and Cincinnati: Hunt & Eaton; Cranston & Curts. 1895.
- Little Lad Jamie. Illustrated by Emma Justine Farnsworth. New York: E. P. Dutton & Company. 1895.
- Happy Little People: Rhymes and Stories About and for Them. Illustrated by Paul King. Boston: Lothrop Publishing Company. 1898.
- Poor Sallie and Her Christmas, and Other Stories. Illustrated by Florence Kate Upton. New York: E. P. Dutton and Company. 1898.
- Sunny Hours. New York: American Tract Society. 1899.
- "Sunshine" and Other Poems. Boston and Chicago: United Society of Christian Endeavor. 1899.
- A Merry Little Visit with Auntie. New York: American Tract Society. 1900.
- The Doings of a Dear Little Couple. Philadelphia: Henry Altemus Company. 1900.
- Lassie and Laddie: A Story for Little Lads and Lassies. New York: E. P. Dutton and Company. 1902.
- The Funnyland Boys. 1903.
- How "A Dear Little Couple" Went Abroad. Illustrated by Aimée G. Clifford. Philadelphia: Henry Altemus Company. 1903.
- Mother and Baby: Lullaby Poems. New York: R. H. Russell. 1904.
- Mother's Little Man. Philadelphia: Henry Altemus Company. 1906.
