= Delaware Academy =

Delaware Academy Central School District at Delhi

Location
- Delhi, New York; United States; 42.2721°N 74.9147°W

Information
- Type: Public
- Established: 1819; 207 years ago
- School district: Delaware Academy Central School District
- Principal: Crystal Trask
- Grades: K-12
- Enrollment: 759
- Campus: Rural
- Colors: Maroon and white
- Mascot: Bulldog
- Affiliation: Delaware Academy Central School District at Delhi
- Superintendent: Kelly M. Zimmerman
- Website: www.delhischools.org

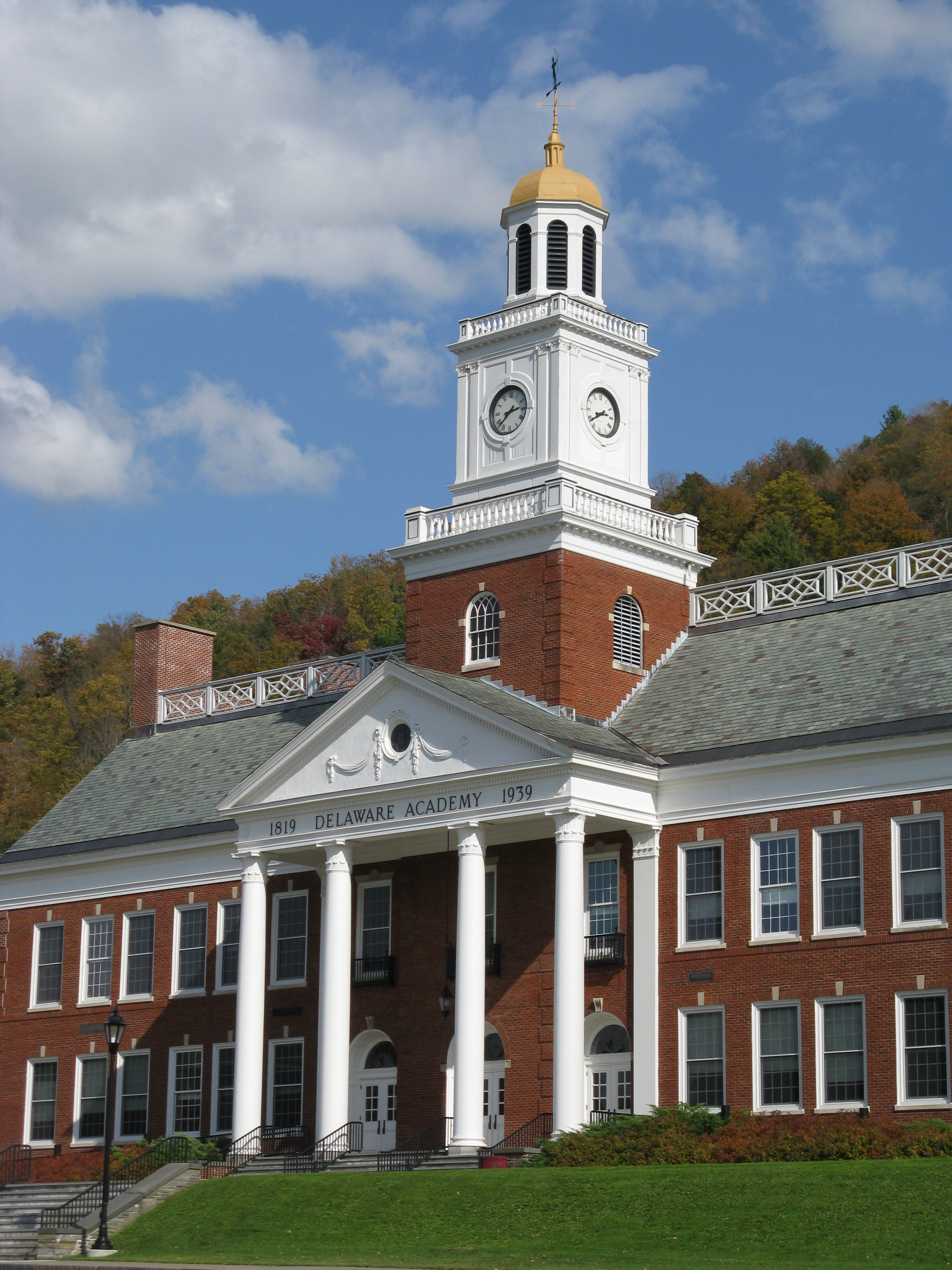
Delaware Academy

Delaware Academy is a K-12 school in Delhi (village), New York, 160 miles (260 km) northwest of New York City.

== History ==
=== 19th century ===
The school was founded in 1819. On April 12 of that year, approval was given for the school to be built. The first entry in the trustee's book was recorded on February 28, 1820. The school opened under the direction of John A. Savage, A.B., principal. Latin, Greek, Astronomy, Natural Philosophy, Natural History, Chemistry, and Mathematics were taught for a fee of 37 and ½ cents per week per student, and the other sciences were taught for 25 cents per week ($4.98 per week, or $259.17 per school year in 2017 US Dollars.) Room and board were supplied for $1.25, ($24.92 per week, or $1295.84 per school year in 2017 US Dollars). Mr. Savage earned $300–350 per year ($5,980.84-6,977.65 in 2017 US Dollars), and Miss Fuller, the main teacher of the school at the time, earned $2.50 per week ($49.84 in 2017 US Dollars). Miss Wells was also employed by the school to aid the teaching effort.

A department was opened for young children in 1838, and, in 1840, a department of common school teachers was started. In 1841, an addition was authorized. In 1857, there were four teachers at the academy and 212 students. By 1865, 353 pupils were attending.

What was known as the "gentleman's boarding hall," or "Academy Hall," to Delhi residents consisted of a kitchen, dining room, and laundry on the first floor. The second floor or the main floor housed the principal's family, administrative offices, and a reception parlor, with a Chickering piano. The third floor was where the scholars resided. These boys were divided up into two dormitory rooms. The building was heated by a hot air furnace and had primitive plumbing, and only two or three bathtubs.

In the 1880s, Delaware Academy had in residence perhaps its most famous teacher: the Honorable Charles Evans Hughes. Hughes, who was working on his law degree while teaching at DA, went on to become Governor of New York (1907–1910), Associate Justice of The Supreme Court (1910–1916), presidential nominee of the Republican party (1916), US Secretary of State (1921–25), and Chief Justice of The Supreme Court (1930–1941).

=== 20th century ===
Delaware Academy was leased to the Board of Education of Union Free School District number 16 on December 4, 1902, by the Regents of the university of the State of New York in Albany. Part of the Delhi village's grammar classes were taken to the school. The academy became part of the public education system of New York in 1910. The school was officially given the name "Union Free School," but it continued to be recognized by Delhi residents as "Delaware Academy."

In September 1936 seventh and eighth grades were brought to DA from outlying districts. On March 25, 1937, 300 acres (1.2 km^{2}) referred to the Sheldon property were purchased by the tax payers for $15,000. On June 21, 1938, plans were presented in preparation for construction on the recently bought Sheldon Plot. The total cost of the school was $808,000, and the government contributed $304,335 toward the cause. The new expansion opened on September 9, 1940. At that time, the athletic field consisted of a playground and four tennis courts. A parking lot was made to hold 250 cars. The building itself had 56 rooms downstairs and 29 rooms upstairs.

The school also underwent an extensive renovation and expansion that concluded in the early 2000s.

=== Athletics ===
Delaware Academy competes in New York State Class C and D athletics. The school has won state championships in women's basketball (2018), football (2001), and women's cross country (1978, 1979, 1981, 2019).
