= Portière =

Hanging curtain placed over a door or over the doorless entrance to a room

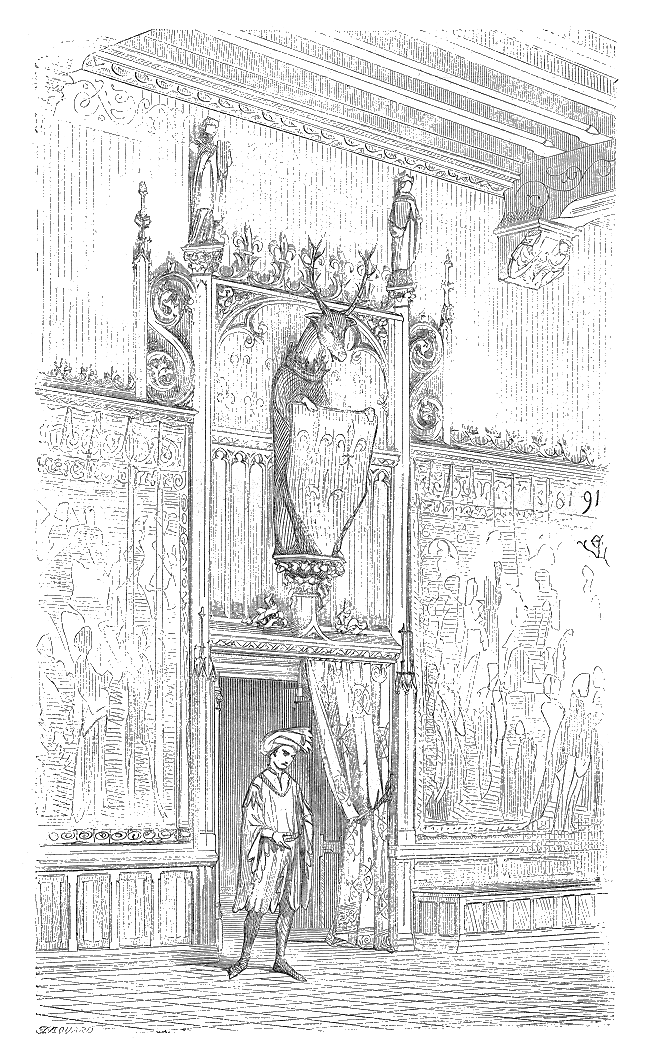
Line drawing of a portière (14th to 15th century).

A portière (French pronunciation: [pɔʁtjɛʁ]) is a hanging curtain placed over a door or over the doorless entrance to a room. Its name is derived from the word for door in French: porte.

== History ==
From Asia, it came to Europe at a remote date. It is known to have been in use in Europe in the 4th century, and was probably introduced much earlier. Like so many other domestic furnishings, it reached England by way of France, where it appears to have been originally called rideau de Porte (literally, "door curtain").

Common in wealthier households during the Victorian era, it is still occasionally used either as an ornament or as a means of mitigating drafts. It is usually of some heavy material, such as velvet, brocade, or plush, and is often fixed upon a brass arm, moving in a socket with the opening and closing of the door.

== Rising portière ==
A rising portière is a simple but effective mechanism. It is fastened to both the door and the wall near the hinge, such that the rail rises itself when the door is opened. This allows the curtain to be long enough to seal against the floor and contain draughts, but not drag on the floor or catch under the door when the door is opened. Rising portières come in different configurations to seal the curtain against different door surrounds.

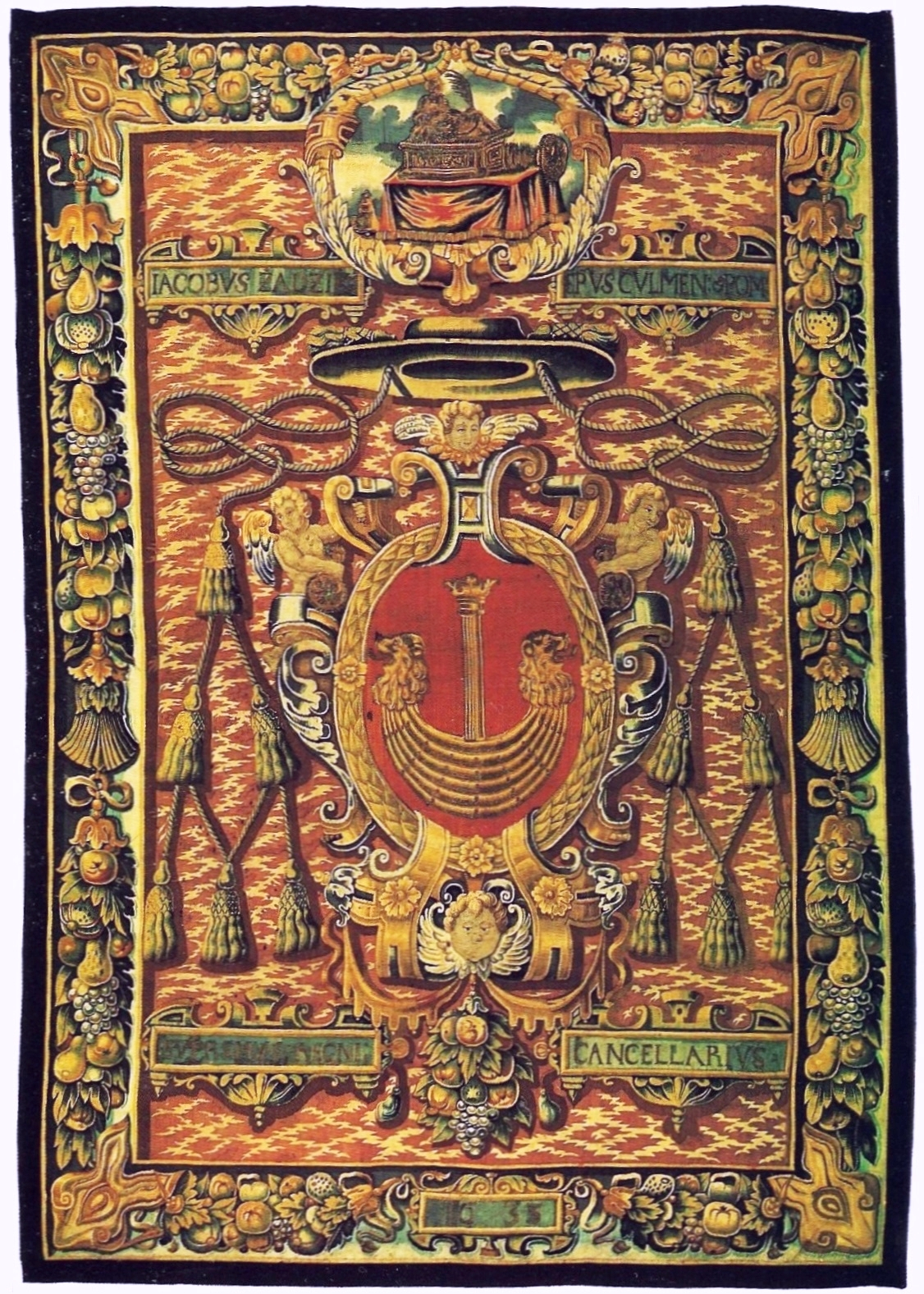
Heraldic portière of Jakub Zadzik, Bishop of Kraków, wool, silk, silver and gold, c. 1633

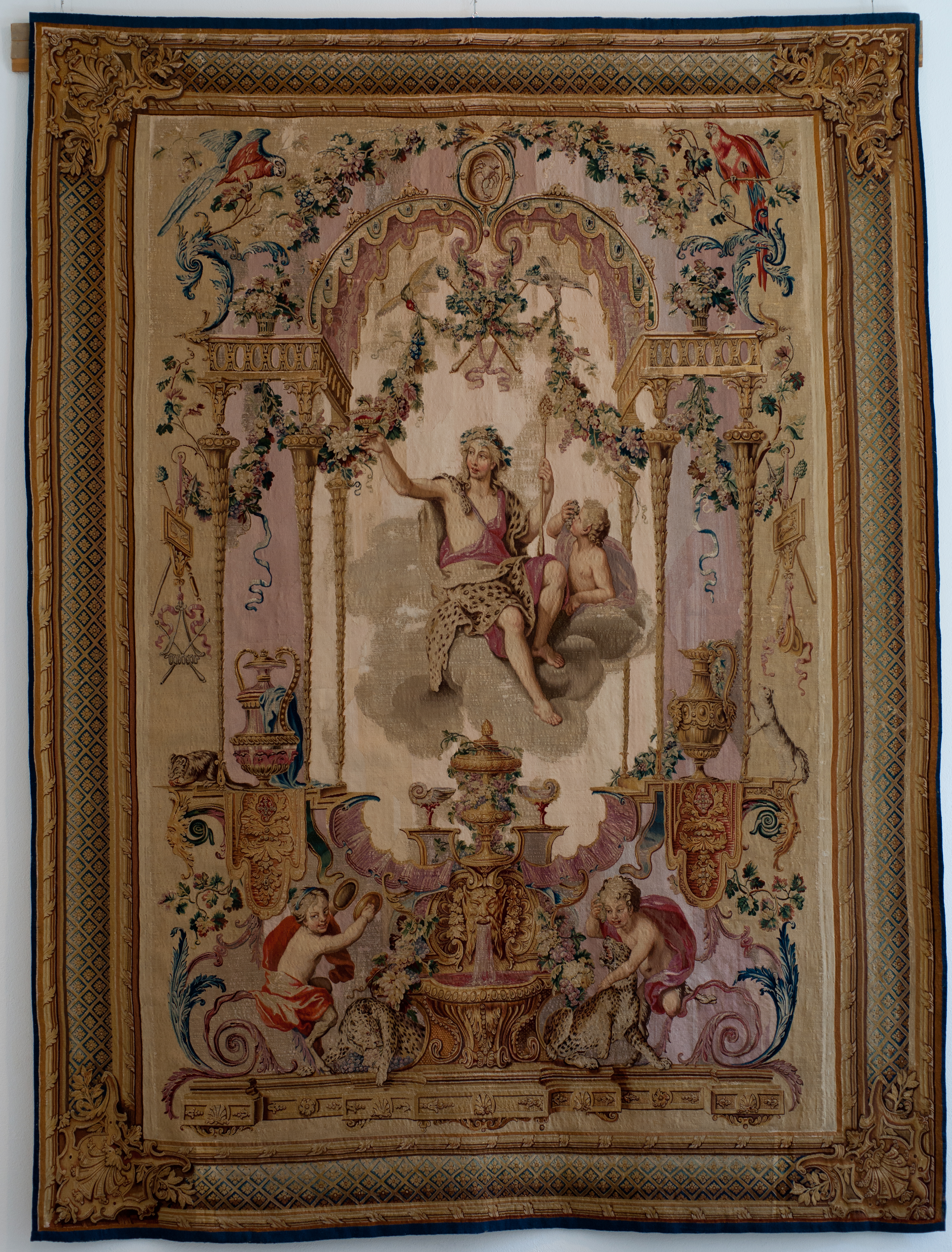
Portière of Bacchus, wool and silk tapestry, French, 1700s

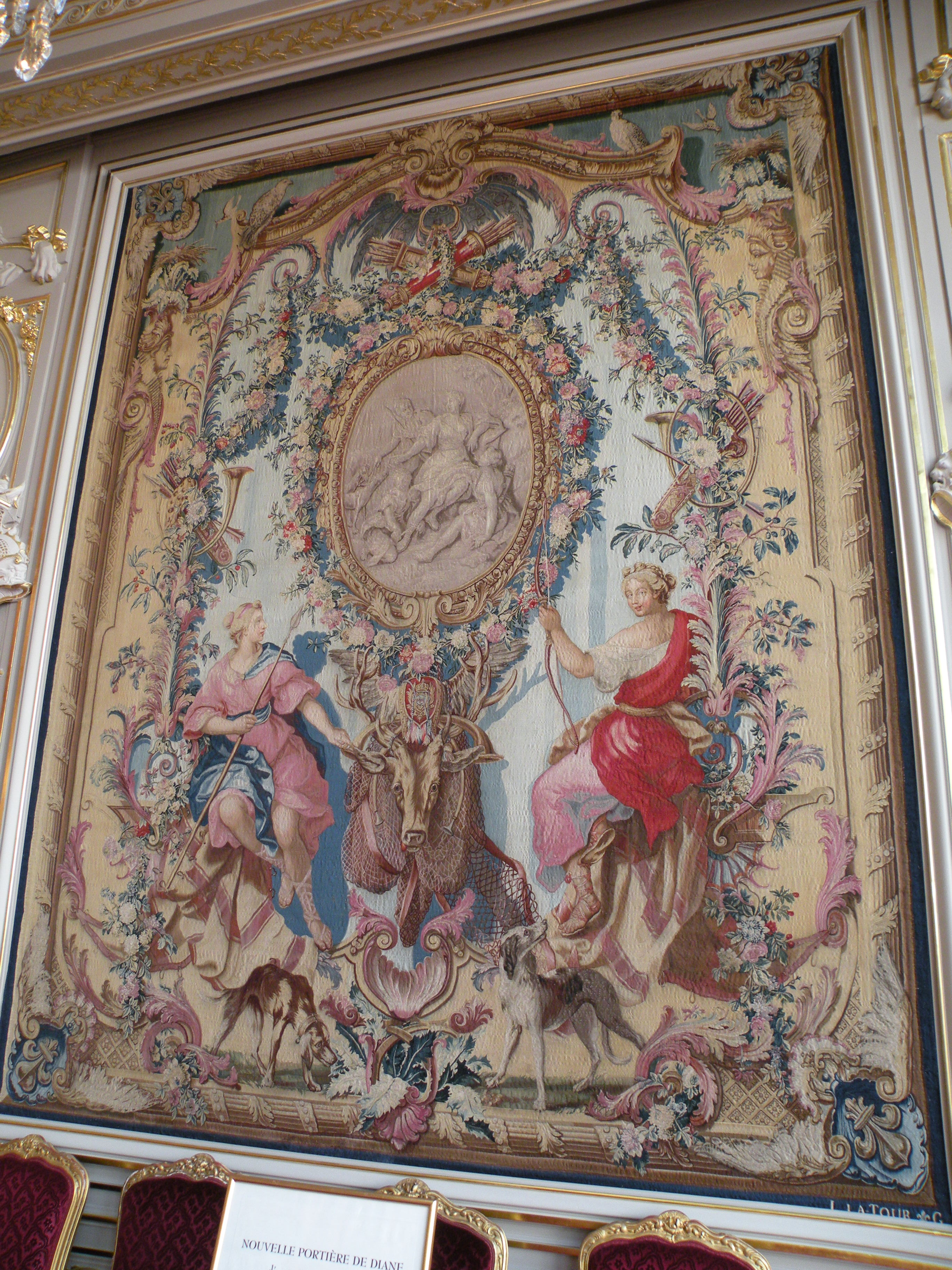
New portière of Diane, hung as a wall tapestry, Pierre Jose Perrot, 1700s

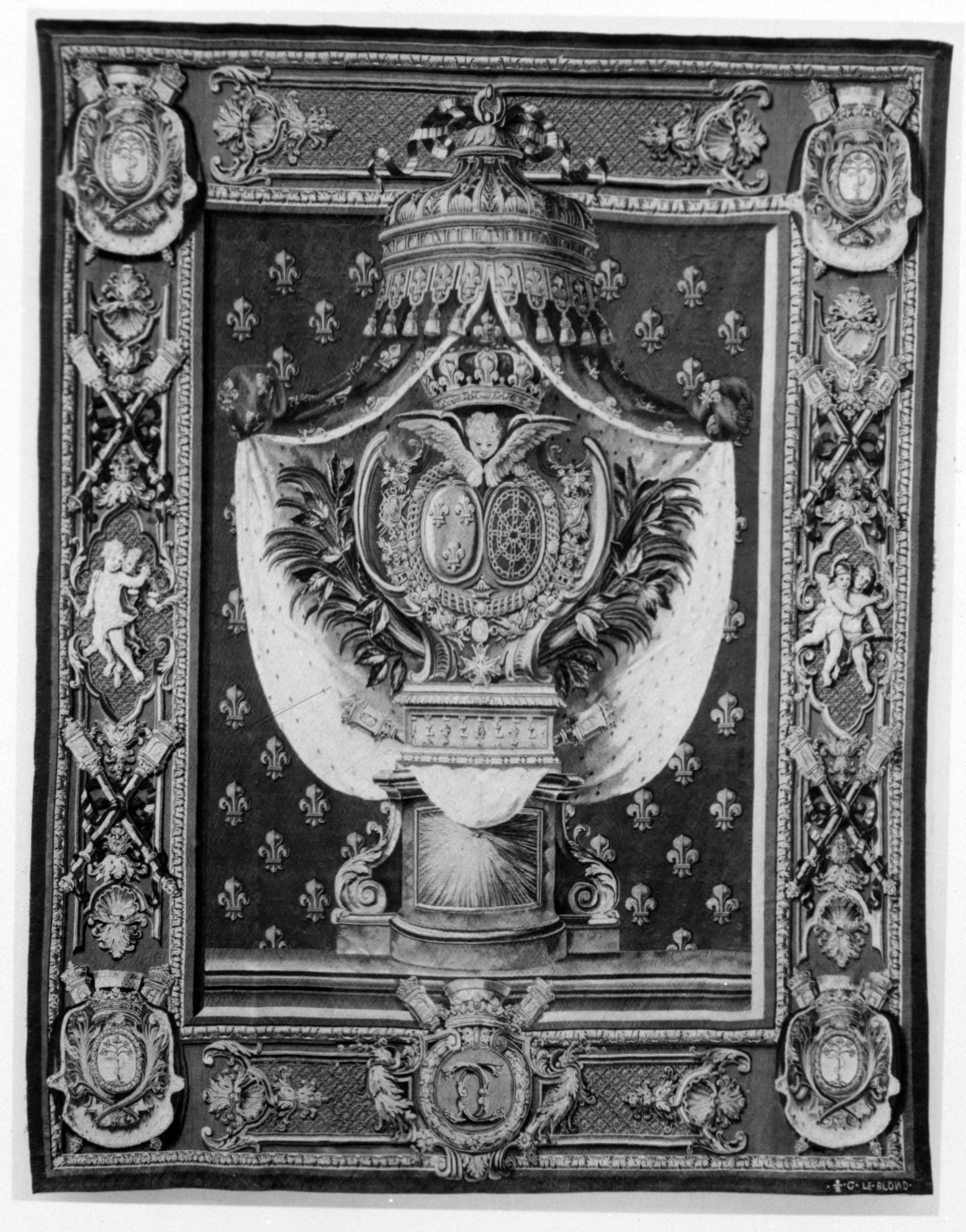
Portière with the Chauvelin arms from a set called a Chancellerie, wool and silk, designed 1679 and 1700, borders c. 1720, woven 1728–30

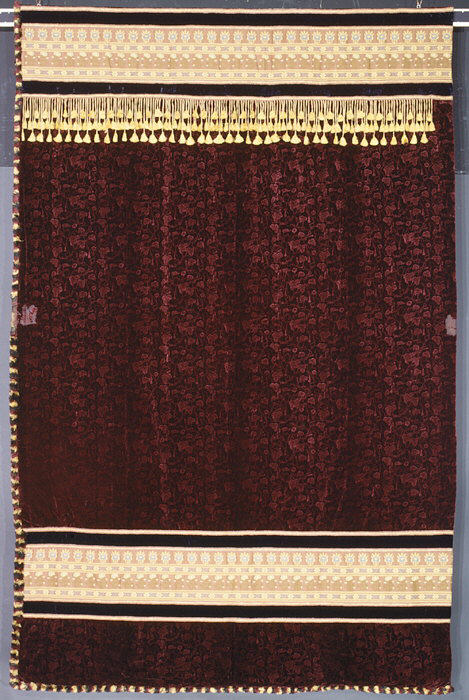
Portière showing draft-excluding fringe on two sides, silk velvet, cotton, wool, c. 1878–1880

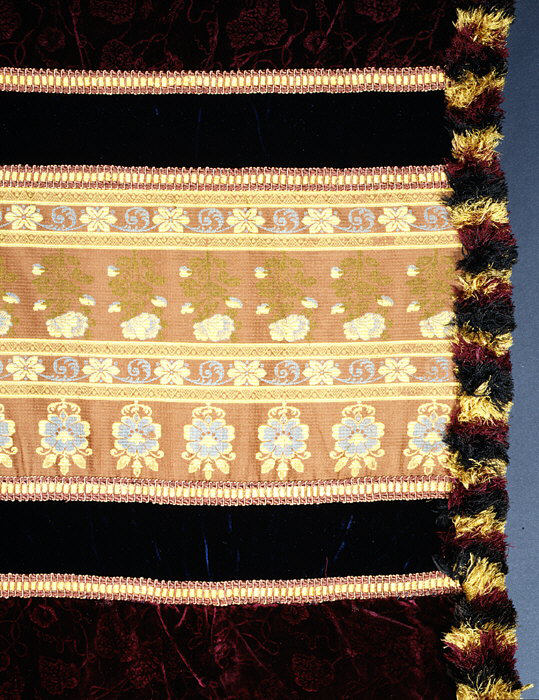
Close-up of draft-excluding fringe

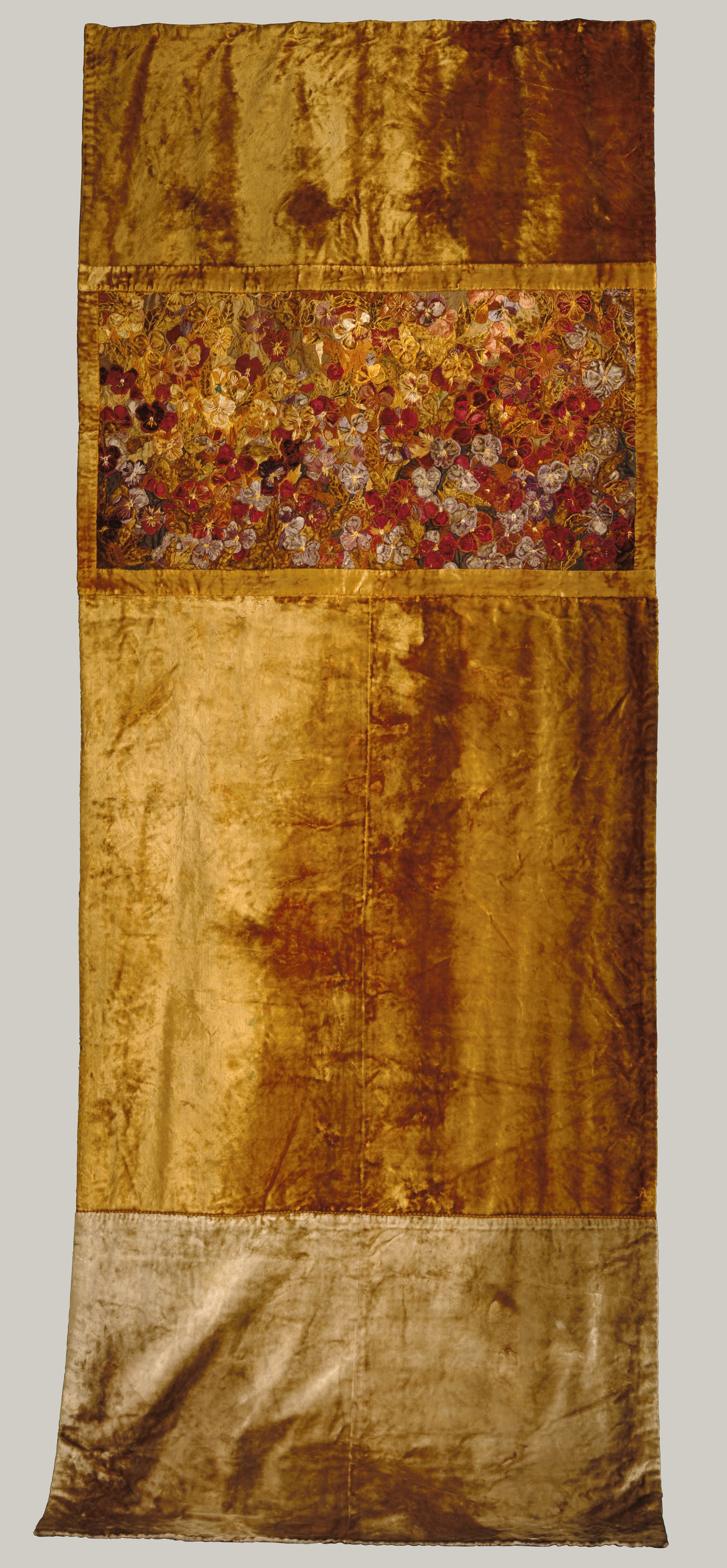
Silk velvet, and silk appliquéd and embroidered with silk and wool, silk damask, c. 1883

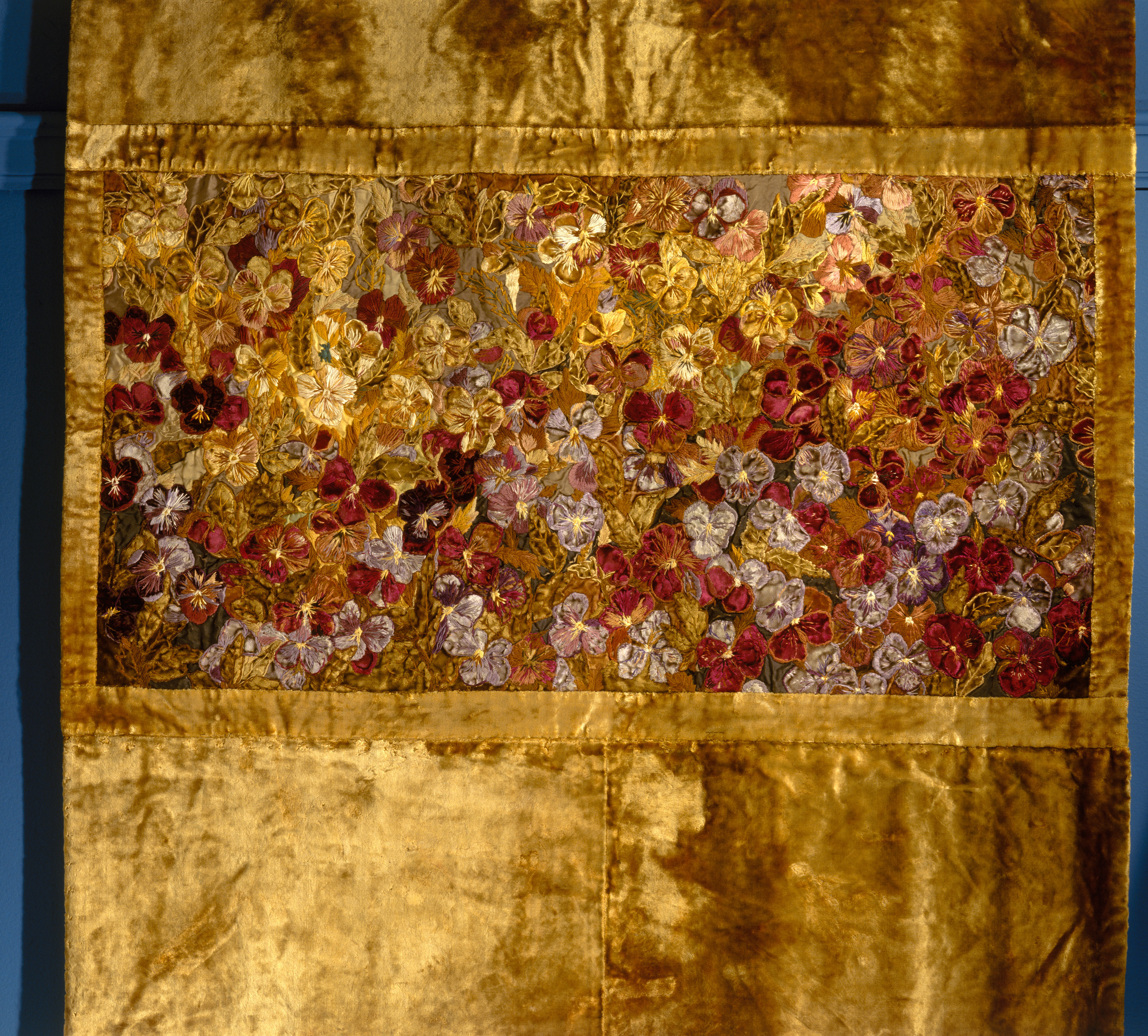
Close-up of appliquéd panel

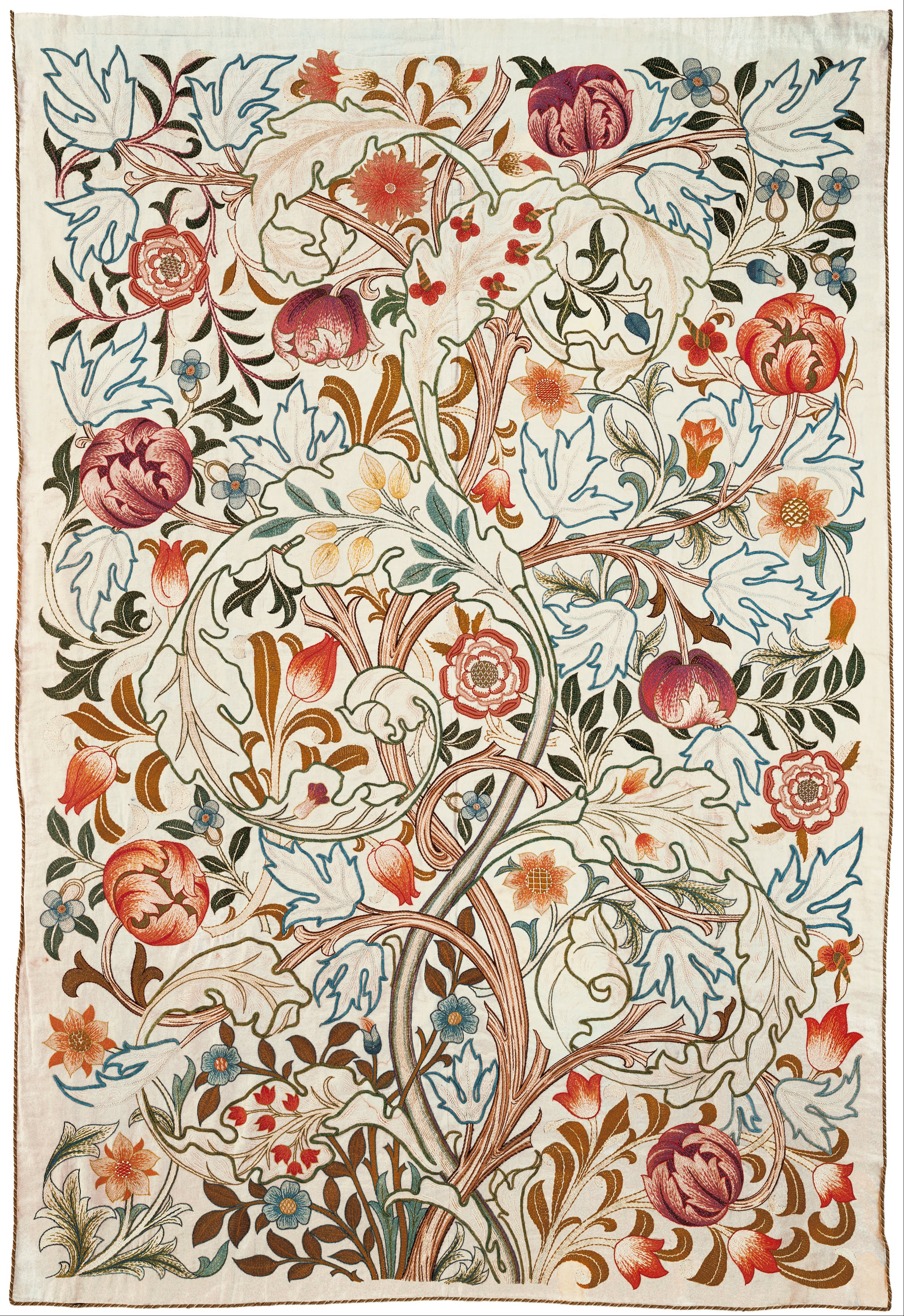
Acanthus portière, Morris and Co., silk embroidery on linen, 1890s

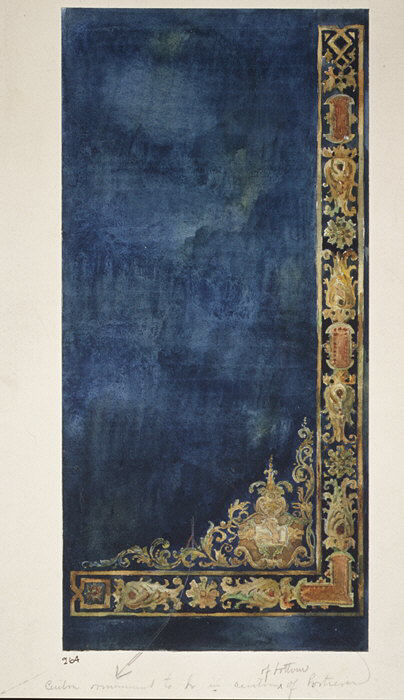
Design for a portière by Louis Comfort Tiffany, c. 1890–1902

== See also ==
- Noren (less insulating door curtain)
