= List of people from New York (state) =

State flag of New York

Location of New York in the United States

The following is a list of prominent people who were born in/lived in or around the U.S. state of New York, or for whom New York is a significant part of their identity.

== Government and politics ==
=== Presidents ===
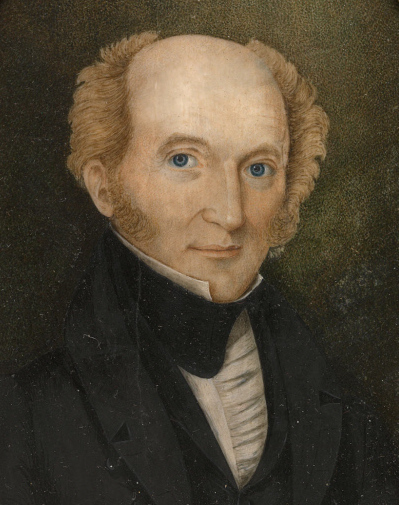
Martin Van Buren

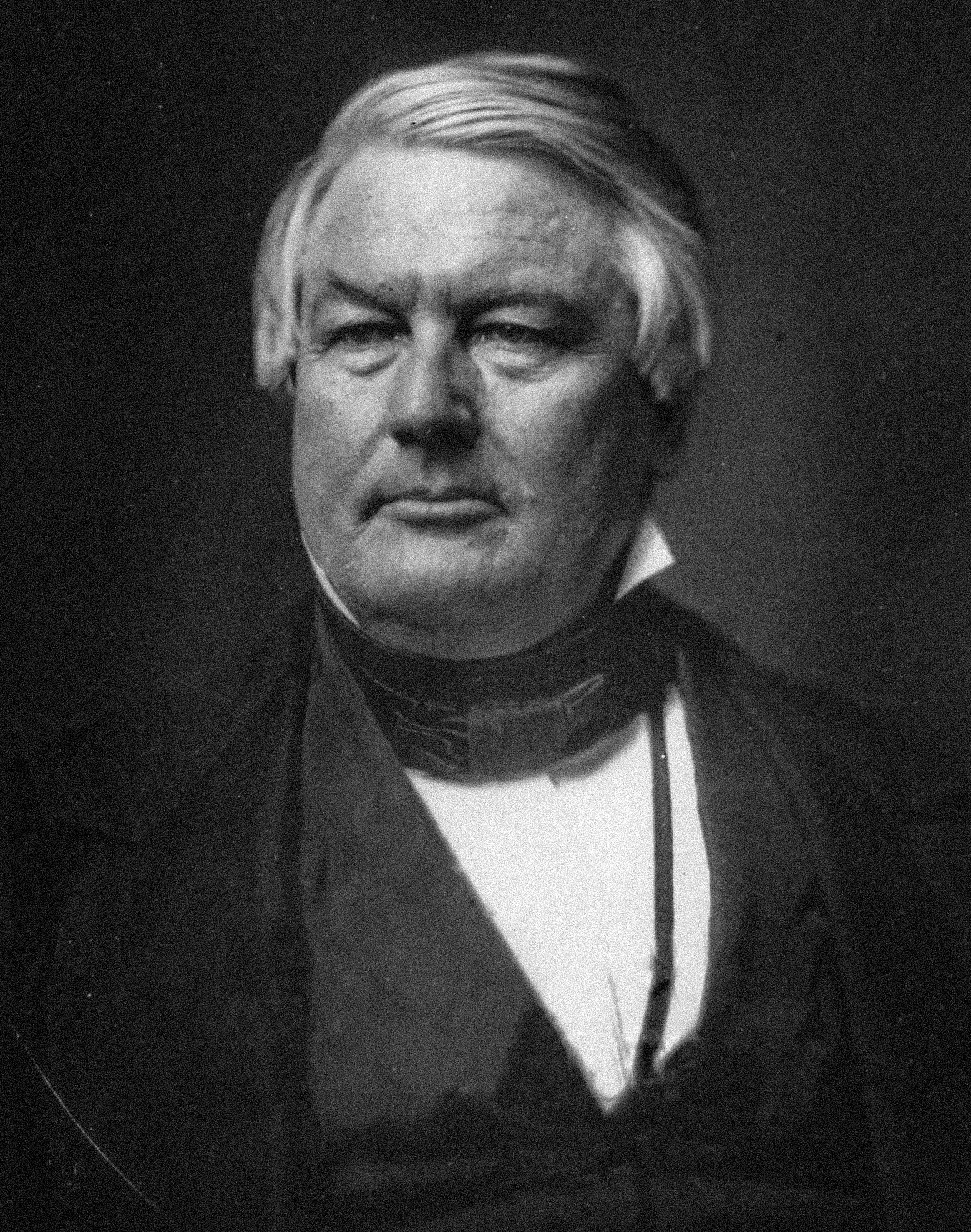
Millard Fillmore

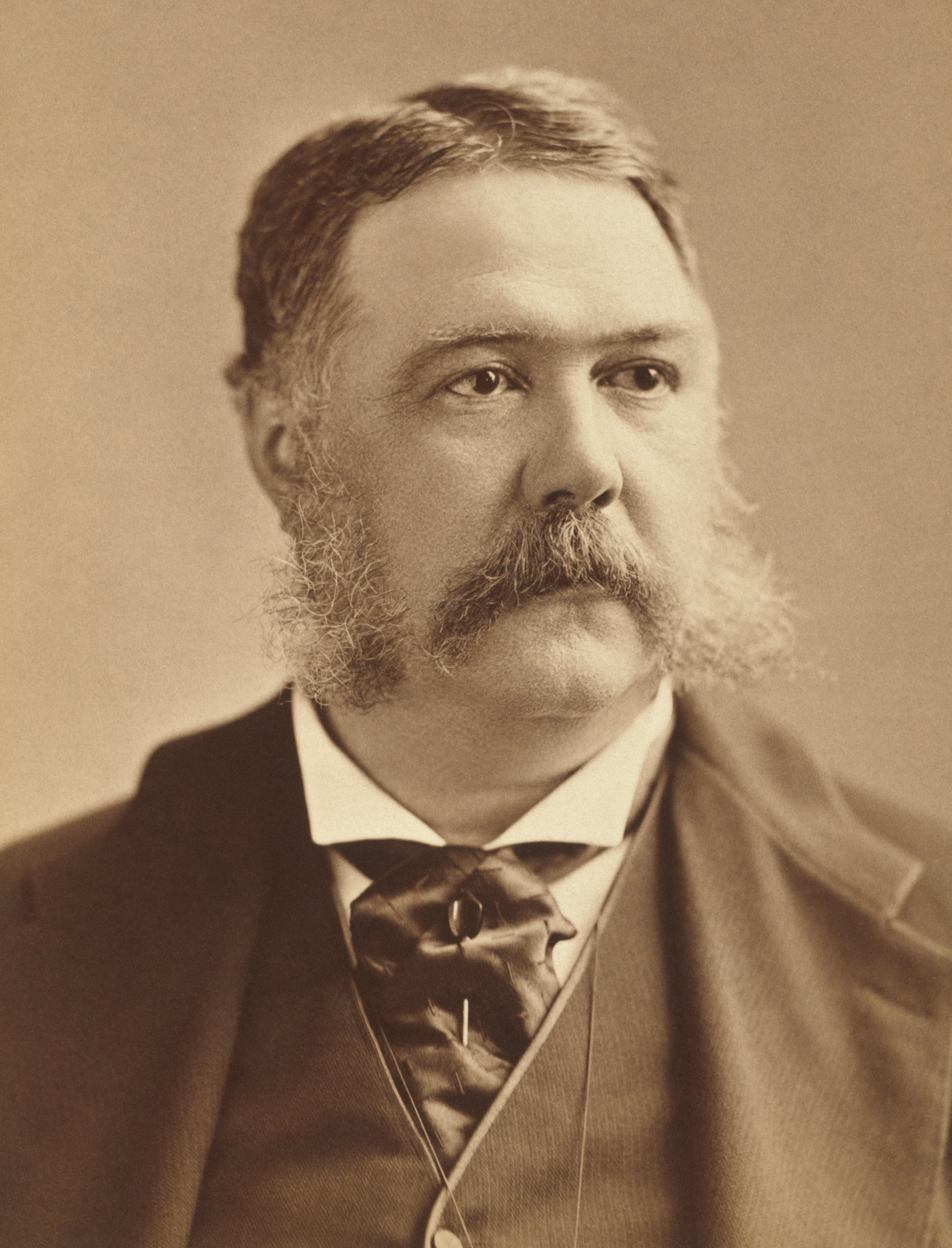
Chester A. Arthur

Grover Cleveland

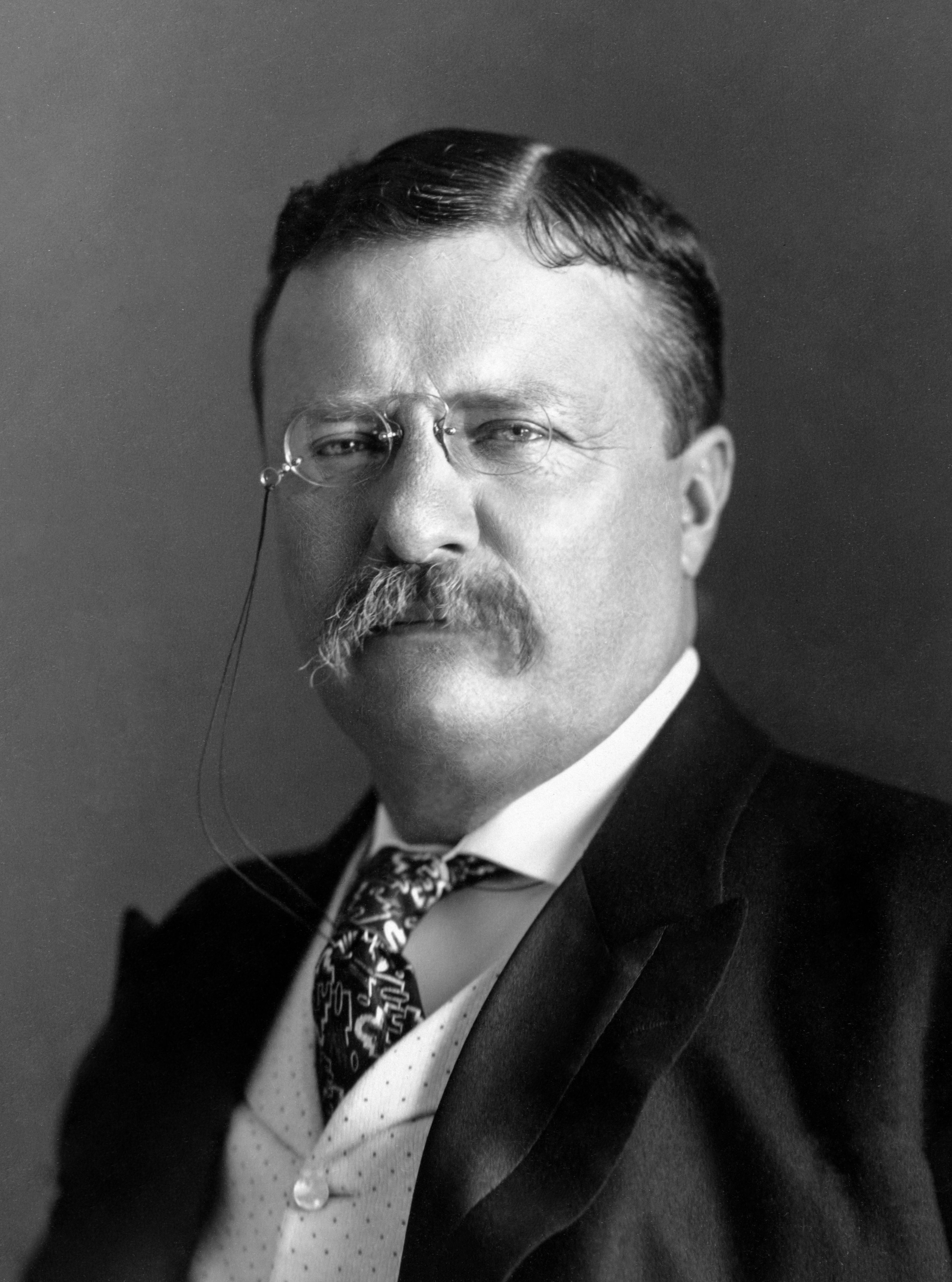
Theodore Roosevelt

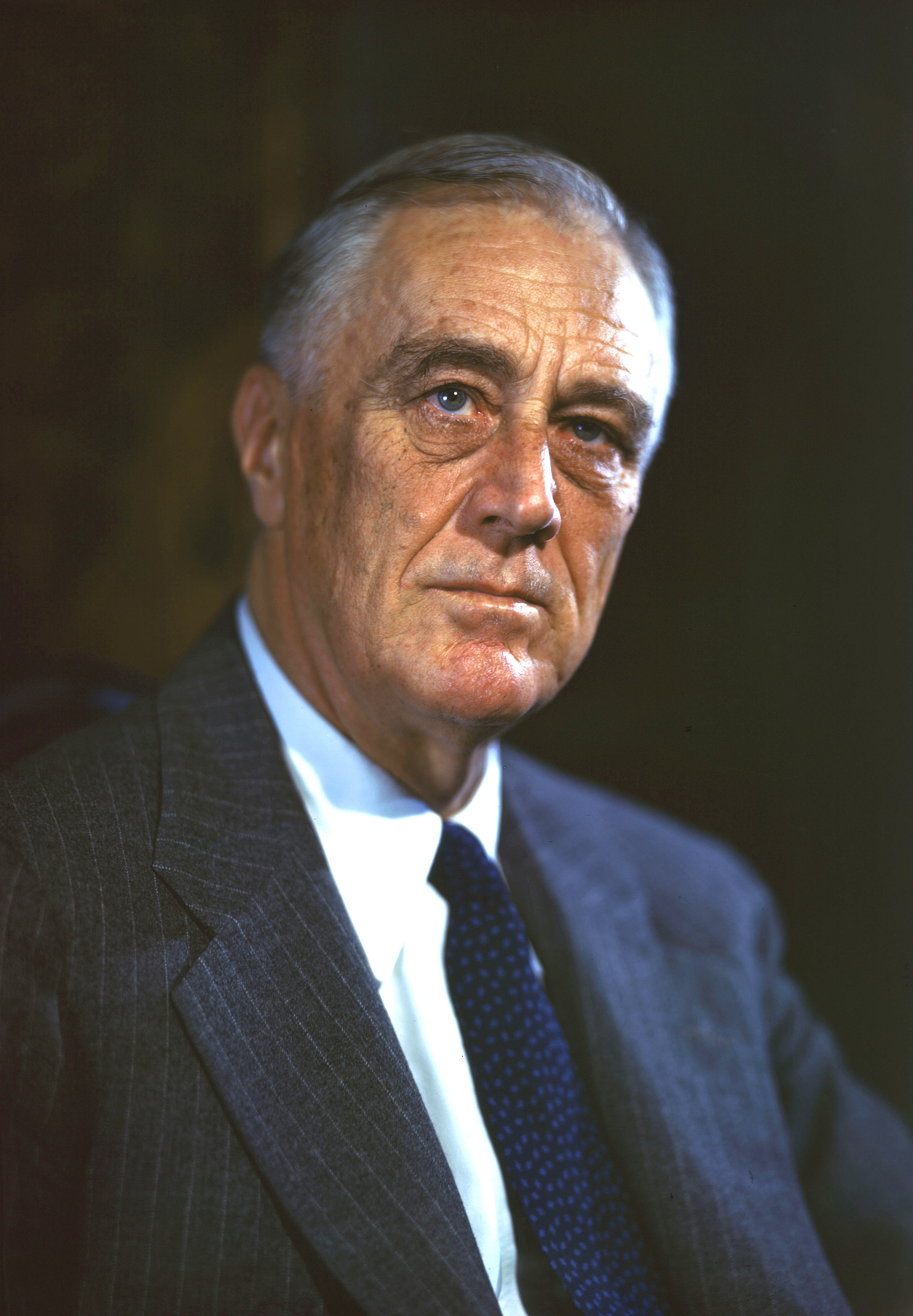
Franklin D. Roosevelt

Donald Trump

- Chester A. Arthur (1829–1886), 20th vice president and 21st president of the United States – Schenectady
- Grover Cleveland (1837–1908), 22nd and 24th president of the United States – Fayetteville
- Millard Fillmore (1800–1874), 12th vice president and 13th president of the United States – Moravia
- Theodore Roosevelt (1858–1919), 25th vice president and 26th president of the United States – Manhattan
- Franklin D. Roosevelt (1883–1945), 32nd president of the United States – Hyde Park
- Donald Trump (born 1946), 47th president of the United States (previously 45th) – Queens
- Martin Van Buren (1782–1862), 8th vice president and 8th president of the United States – Kinderhook

=== Vice presidents ===
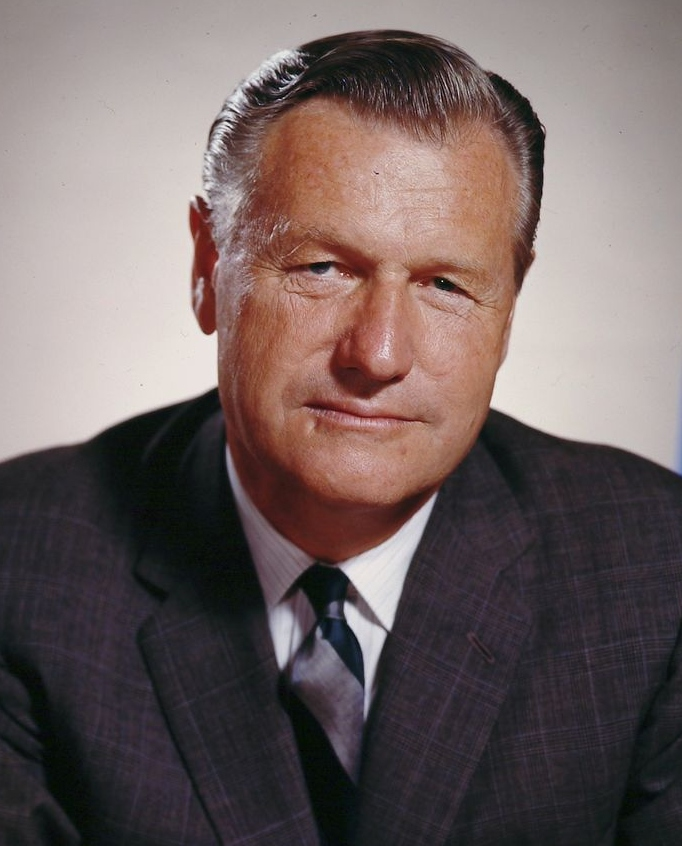
Nelson Rockefeller

- Aaron Burr (1756–1836), 3rd vice president of the United States – Manhattan
- George Clinton (1739–1812), 4th vice president of the United States – Little Britain
- Schuyler Colfax (1823–1885), 17th vice president of the United States – Manhattan
- Levi P. Morton (1824–1920), 22nd vice president of the United States – Albany
- Nelson Rockefeller (1908–1979), 41st vice president of the United States – Albany
- James S. Sherman (1855–1912), 27th vice president of the United States – Utica
- Daniel D. Tompkins (1774–1825), 6th vice president of the United States – Scarsdale
- William A. Wheeler (1819–1887), 19th vice president of the United States – Malone

=== Governors ===
- DeWitt Clinton (1769–1828), 6th governor of New York, built the Erie Canal
- Andrew Cuomo (born 1957), 56th governor of New York, praised for his handling of the COVID-19 pandemic, but forced into resigning amid sexual harassment allegations
- Mario Cuomo (1932–2015), 52nd governor of New York, father of Andrew Cuomo
- Howard Dean (born 1948), former governor of Vermont (1991–2003), and 2004 Democratic candidate for president
- Thomas E. Dewey (1902–1971), 47th governor of New York, Republican nominee for president in 1944 and 1948
- Charles Evans Hughes (1862–1948), 36th governor of New York, aecretary of atate, 11th chief justice of the United States and 1916 Republican presidential nominee
- Kathy Hochul (born 1958), 57th (incumbent) governor of New York, and first woman to hold that position
- John Jay (1745–1829), 1st chief justice of the United States, 2nd Governor of New York, and 8th president of the Continental Congress
- David Paterson (born 1954), 55th governor of New York, first African American governor and lieutenant governor of New York
- George Pataki (born 1945), 53rd governor of New York, governor during the 9/11 attacks
- L. Bradford Prince (1810–1886), governor of New Mexico Territory and member of New York's state assembly and state senate
- Horatio Seymour (1810–1886), 18th governor of New York and 1868 Democratic presidential nominee
- Al Smith (1873–1944), 42nd governor of New York and 1928 Democratic presidential candidate
- Samuel J. Tilden (1814–1886), 25th governor of New York and 1876 Republican presidential candidate

=== Senators ===
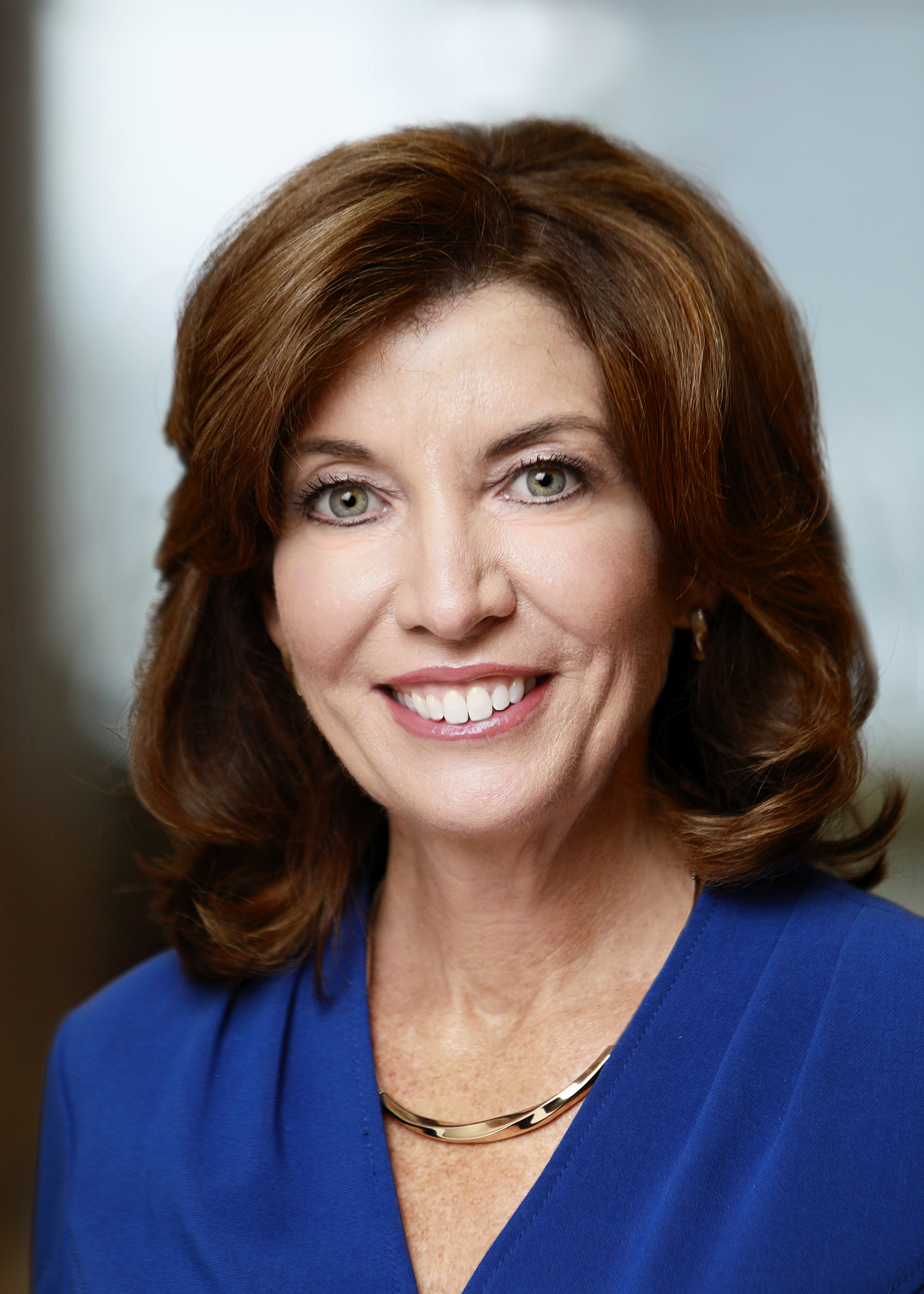
Kathy Hochul

- Barbara Boxer (born 1940), longtime United States senator from California (1993–2017) – New York City
- Hillary Clinton (born 1947), former United States Secretary of State (2009–2013), New York senator (2000–2009), and former First Lady (1993–2000), 2016 Democratic nominee for president – Chappaqua
- Roscoe Conkling (1829–1888), New York senator (1867–1881) and leader of the Stalwart faction of the Republican Party – Albany
- Al Franken (born 1951), Minnesota senator (2009–2018) – New York City
- Kirsten Gillibrand (born 1966), New York senator since 2009 – Albany
- Bob Menendez (born 1954), New Jersey senator (2006–2024) – New York City
- Chris Murphy (born 1973), former congressman (2007–2013) and current Connecticut senator since 2013 – White Plains
- Bernie Sanders (born 1941), Vermont senator since 2007, former Mayor of Burlington, Vermont (1981–1989) and 2016 and 2020 Democratic presidential candidate – Brooklyn
- Chuck Schumer (born 1950), Democratic Leader of the United States Senate since 2017 and long-time New York senator since 1999, cousin of comedian Amy Schumer – Brooklyn
- Robert F. Wagner (1877–1953), New York senator (1927–1949) – Manhattan

=== Mayors ===
- Eric Adams (born 1960), 110th mayor of New York City
- Bill de Blasio (born 1961), 109th mayor of New York City (2014–2021)
- Michael Bloomberg (born 1942), 108th mayor of New York City (2002–2013)
- Rudy Giuliani (born 1944), 107th mayor of New York City (1994–2001), mayor during the 9/11 attacks
- David Dinkins (1927–2020), 106th mayor of New York City (1990–1993), first African-American Mayor of New York City
- Ed Koch (1924–2013) 105th mayor of New York City (1978–1989)
- Fiorello La Guardia (1882–1947), 99th mayor of New York City (1934–1945)
- John Lindsay (1921–2000), 103rd mayor of New York City (1966–1973)
- Zohran Mamdani (born 1991), 111th (incumbent) mayor of New York City
- Stephanus Van Cortlandt (1643–1700), 17th, and first native-born, mayor of New York City (1677–1678 and 1686–1688)
- Robert Anderson Van Wyck (1849–1918), 91st mayor of New York City (1898–1901), first Mayor post-consolidation
- Robert F. Wagner Jr. (1910–1991), 102nd mayor of New York City (1954–1965)
- Jimmy Walker (1881–1946), flamboyant 97th mayor of New York City (1926–1932) forced into resigning by the Seabury Commission

=== Other politicians ===
- Parmenio Adams (1776–1832), sheriff and US congressman
- Alan Bersin (born 1946), President Obama's "Border Czar," US attorney for the Southern District of California, California Secretary of Education, commissioner of US Customs and Border Protection, US Department of Homeland Security Secretary for International Affairs, and INTERPOL vice president
- Alessandra Biaggi (born 1986), New York State senator
- Mario Biaggi (1917–2015), decorated policeman and US congressman
- Shirley Chisholm (1924–2005), US congresswoman and 1972 Democratic presidential candidate
- Éamon de Valera (1882–1975), 3rd president of Ireland
- John "J.J." Dewey (1822–1891), territorial legislator in Minnesota
- August Dietrich, member of the Wisconsin State Assembly
- William H. Donaldson (1931–2024), 27th chairman of the U.S. Securities and Exchange Commission
- Asaph Elston (1845–1914), member of the Wisconsin State Assembly
- Geraldine Ferraro (1935–2011), US congresswoman from New York and first female vice presidential candidate of a major political party in 1984
- Alexander Hamilton (1757–1804), first US secretary of the treasury
- Zach Iscol (born 1978), US Marine Corps veteran, entrepreneur, candidate in the 2021 New York City Comptroller election , Commissioner of New York City Emergency Management
- Boris Johnson (born 1964), Prime Minister of the United Kingdom
- Lazarus Joseph (1891–1966), NY state senator and New York City comptroller
- Anna Kaplan (born 1985), NY State Senator
- Jack Kemp (1935–2009), NFL football player for the Buffalo Bills, secretary of housing under President George H. W. Bush, and 1996 Republican nominee for vice president under Bob Dole
- Caroline Kennedy (born 1957), former U.S. ambassador to Japan (2013–2017), and daughter of former president John F. Kennedy and former First Lady Jacqueline Kennedy Onassis
- Micah Lasher (born 1981) – New York State Assemblyman
- William Loeb Jr. (1866–1937), secretary to President Theodore Roosevelt
- Joseph McGoldrick (1901–1978), NYC comptroller and NY state residential rent control commissioner, lawyer, and professor
- Harvey Milk (1930–1978), first openly gay person to be elected to public office in California
- Mazi Melesa Pilip (born 1978 or 1979), Ethiopian-born American politician
- William M. Tweed (1823–1878), known as "Boss" Tweed; Grand Sachem of Tammany Hall

=== First Ladies ===
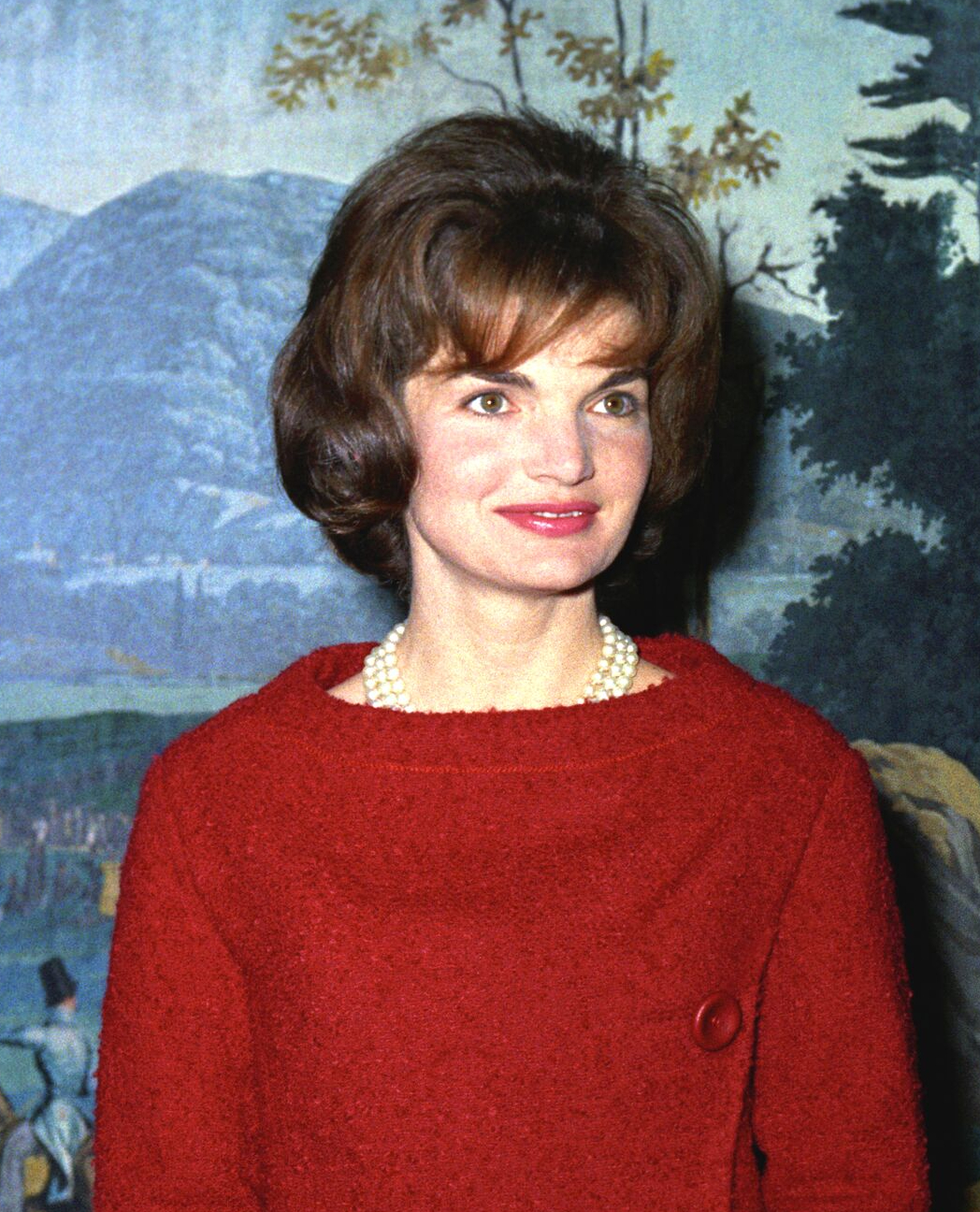
Jacqueline Kennedy Onassis

- Barbara Bush (1925–2018), First Lady of the United States as the wife of George H. W. Bush
- Rose Cleveland (1846–1918), First Lady of the United States as the wife of Grover Cleveland
- Abigail Fillmore (1798–1853), First Lady of the United States as the wife of Millard Fillmore
- Mary Arthur McElroy (1841–1917), acting First Lady of the United States as the sister of Chester A. Arthur
- Elizabeth Monroe (1768–1830), First Lady of the United States as the wife of James Monroe
- Jacqueline Kennedy Onassis (1929–1994), First Lady of the United States as the wife of John F. Kennedy
- Frances Cleveland (1864–1947), First Lady of the United States as the wife of Grover Cleveland
- Nancy Reagan (1921–2016), First Lady of the United States as the wife of Ronald Reagan
- Eleanor Roosevelt (1884–1962), First Lady of the United States as the wife of Franklin D. Roosevelt
- Julia Gardiner Tyler (1820–1889), First Lady of the United States as the wife of John Tyler
- Priscilla Cooper Tyler (1816–1889), First Lady of the United States as the wife of John Tyler

== Entertainment ==
=== Film, television, theater, and dance ===
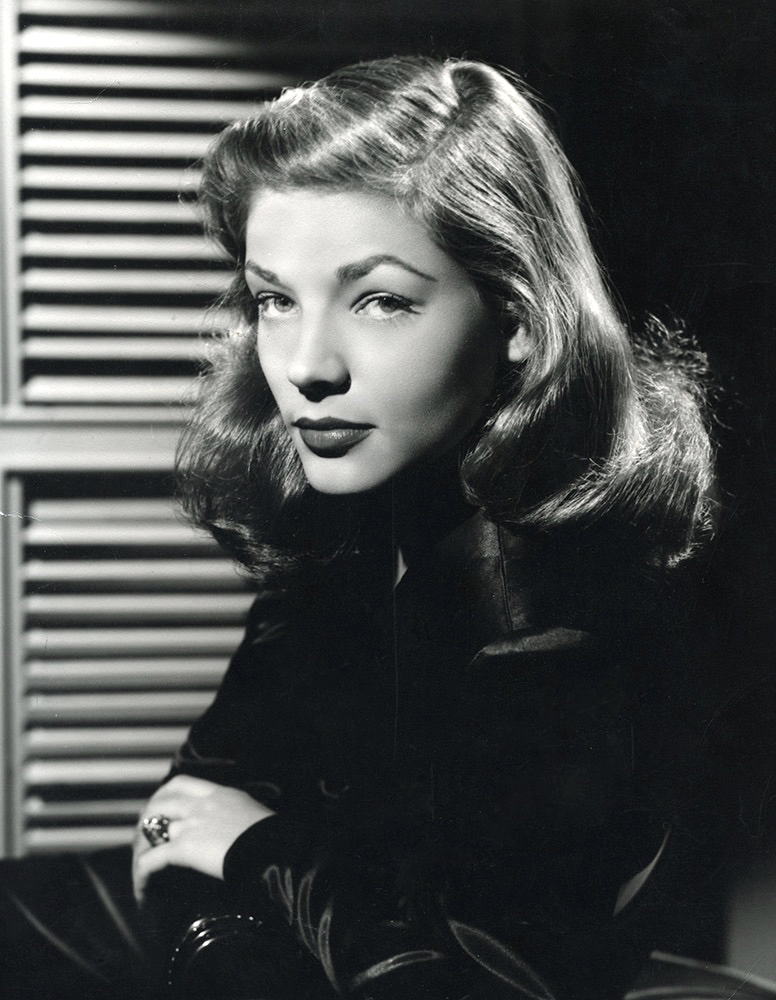
Lauren Bacall

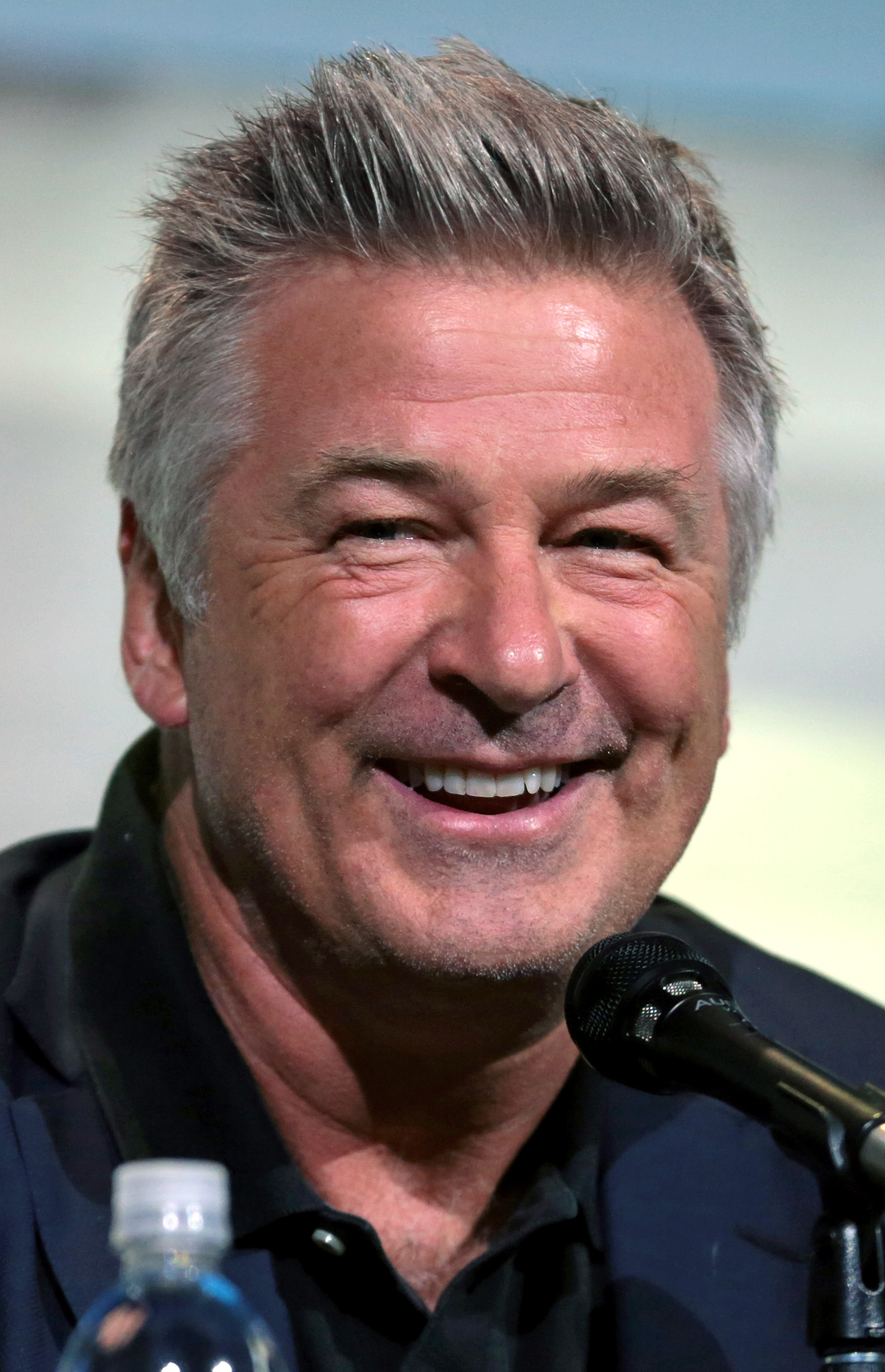
Alec Baldwin

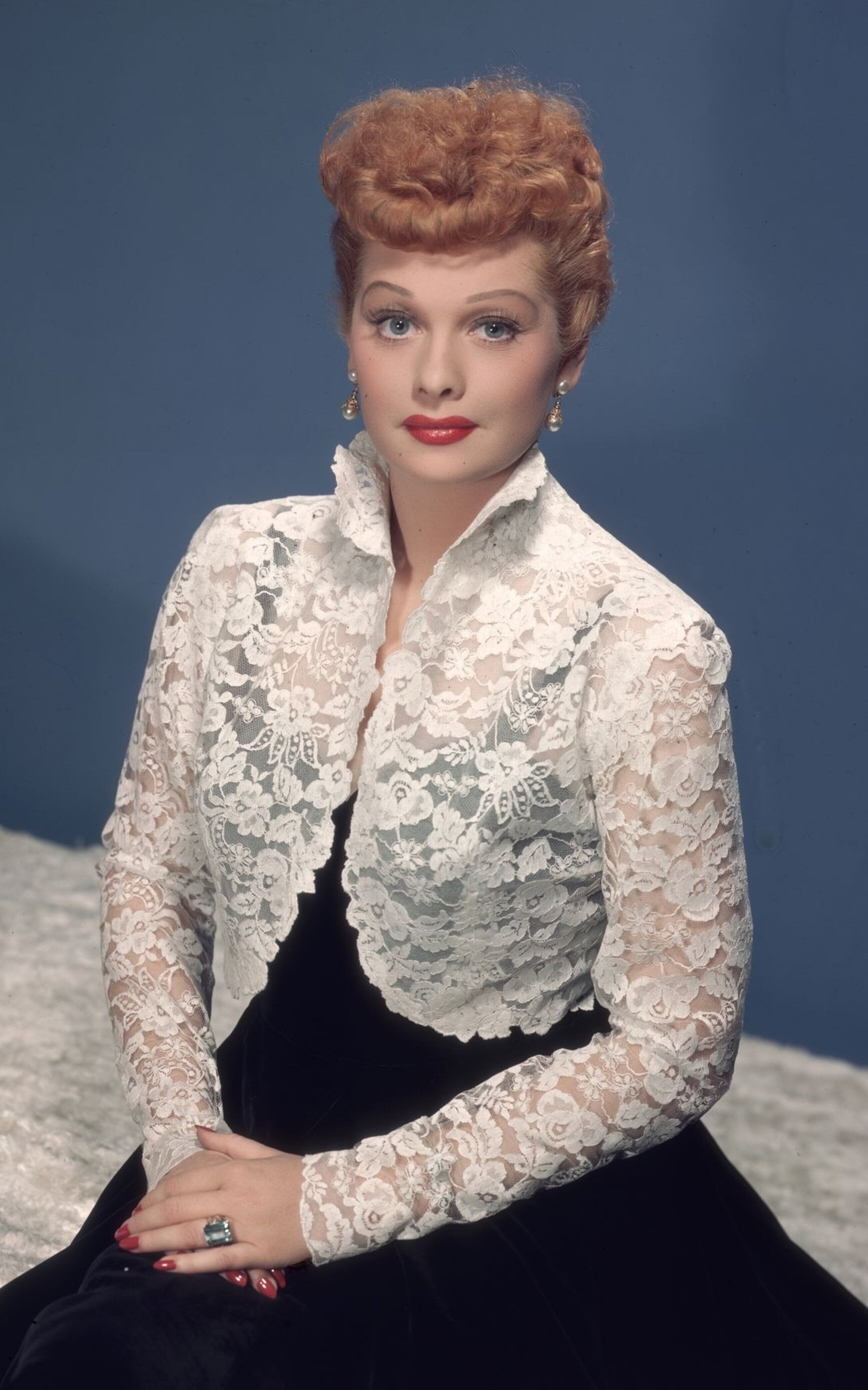
Lucille Ball

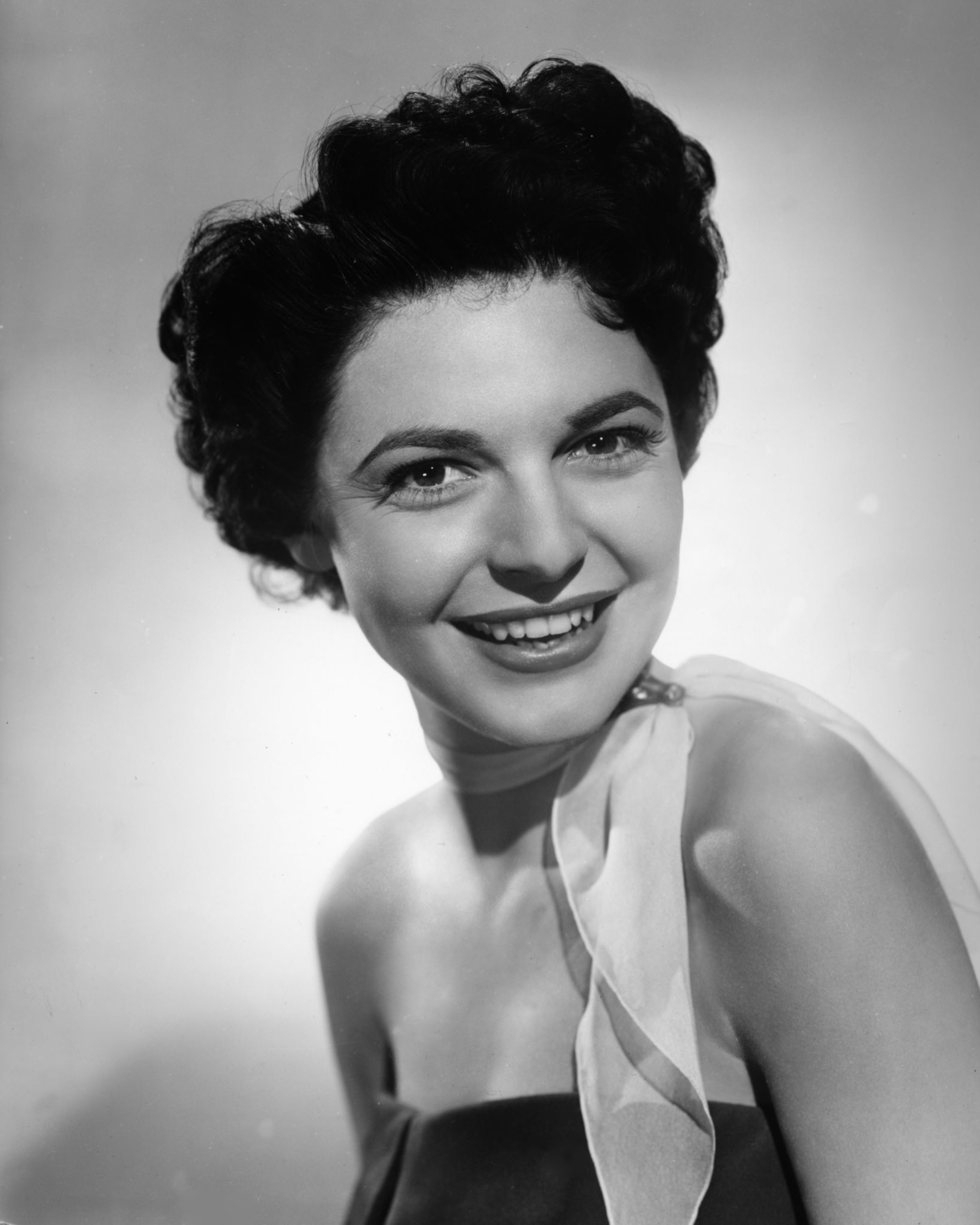
Anne Bancroft

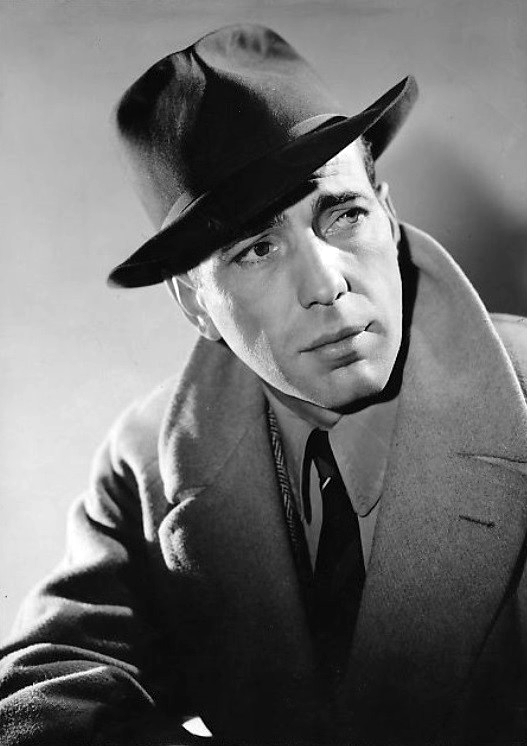
Humphrey Bogart

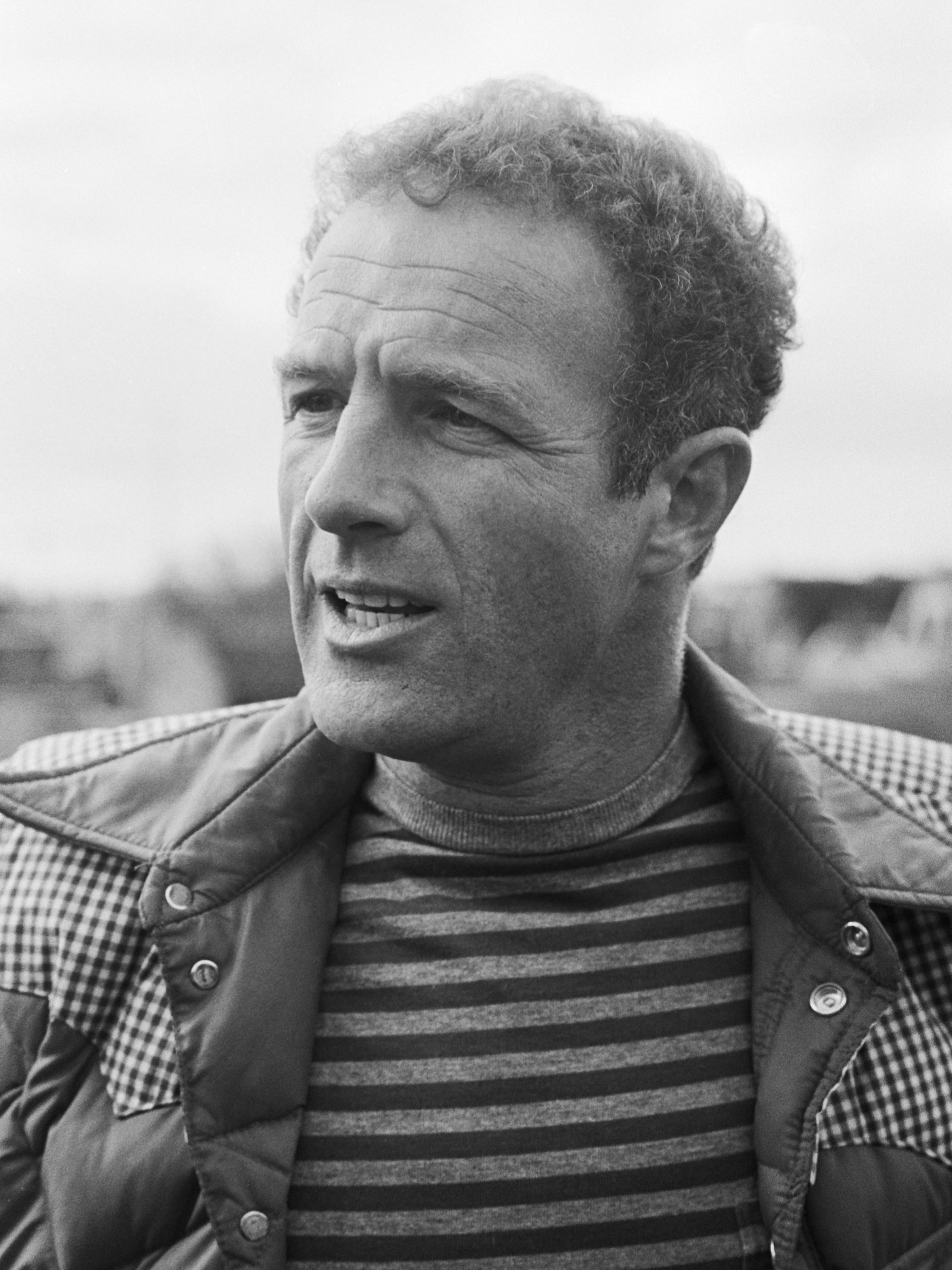
James Caan

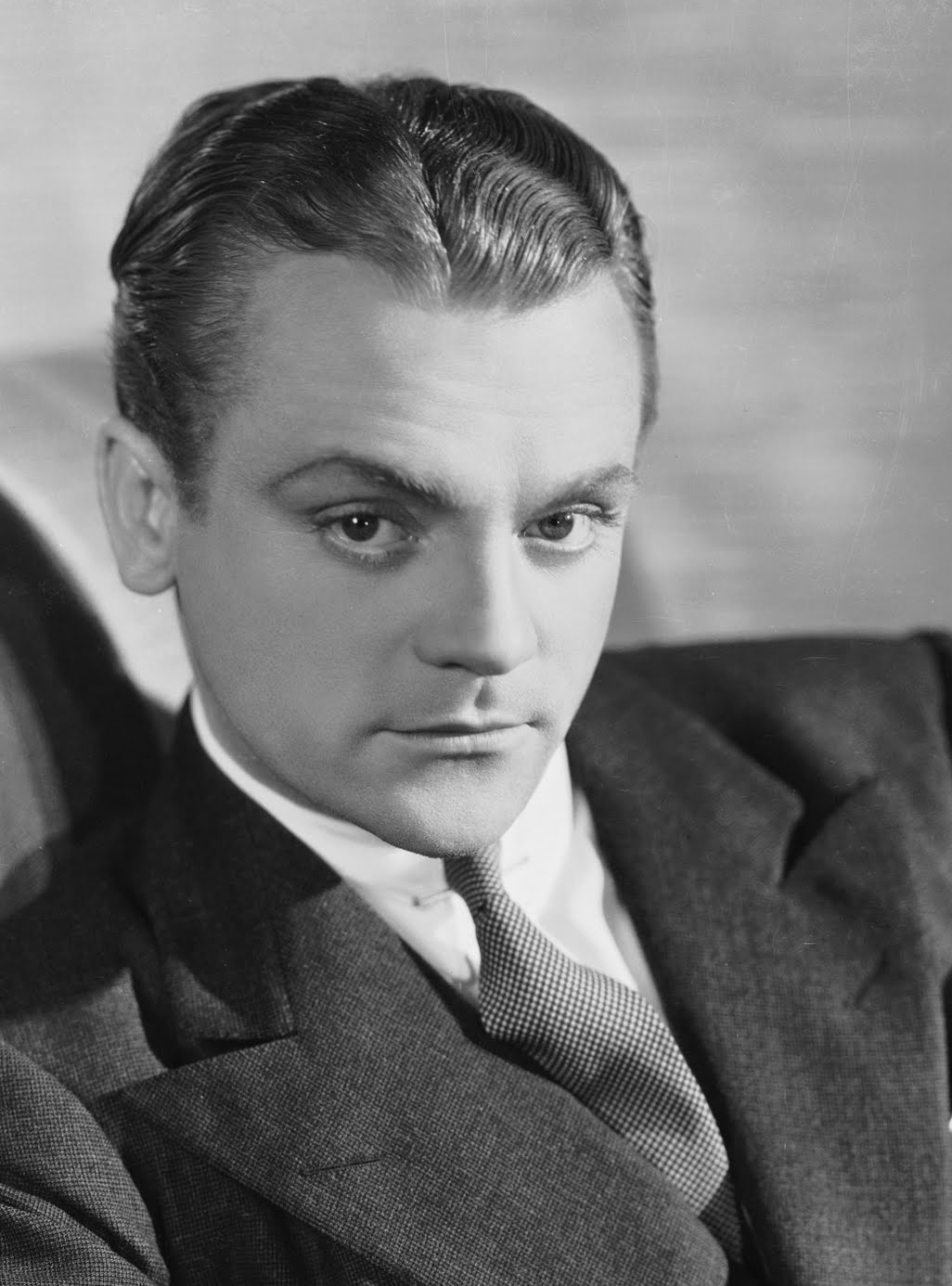
James Cagney

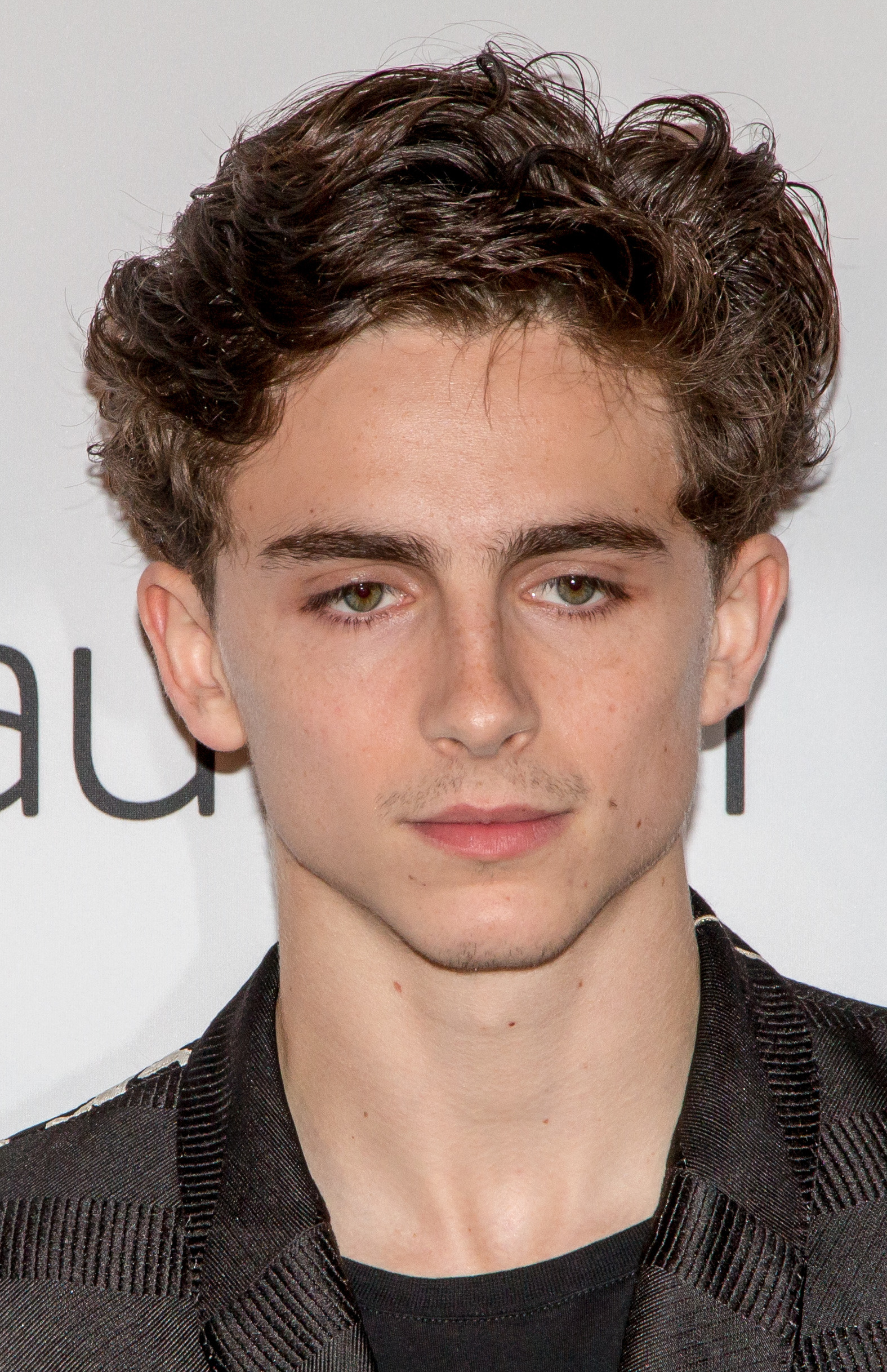
Timothée Chalamet

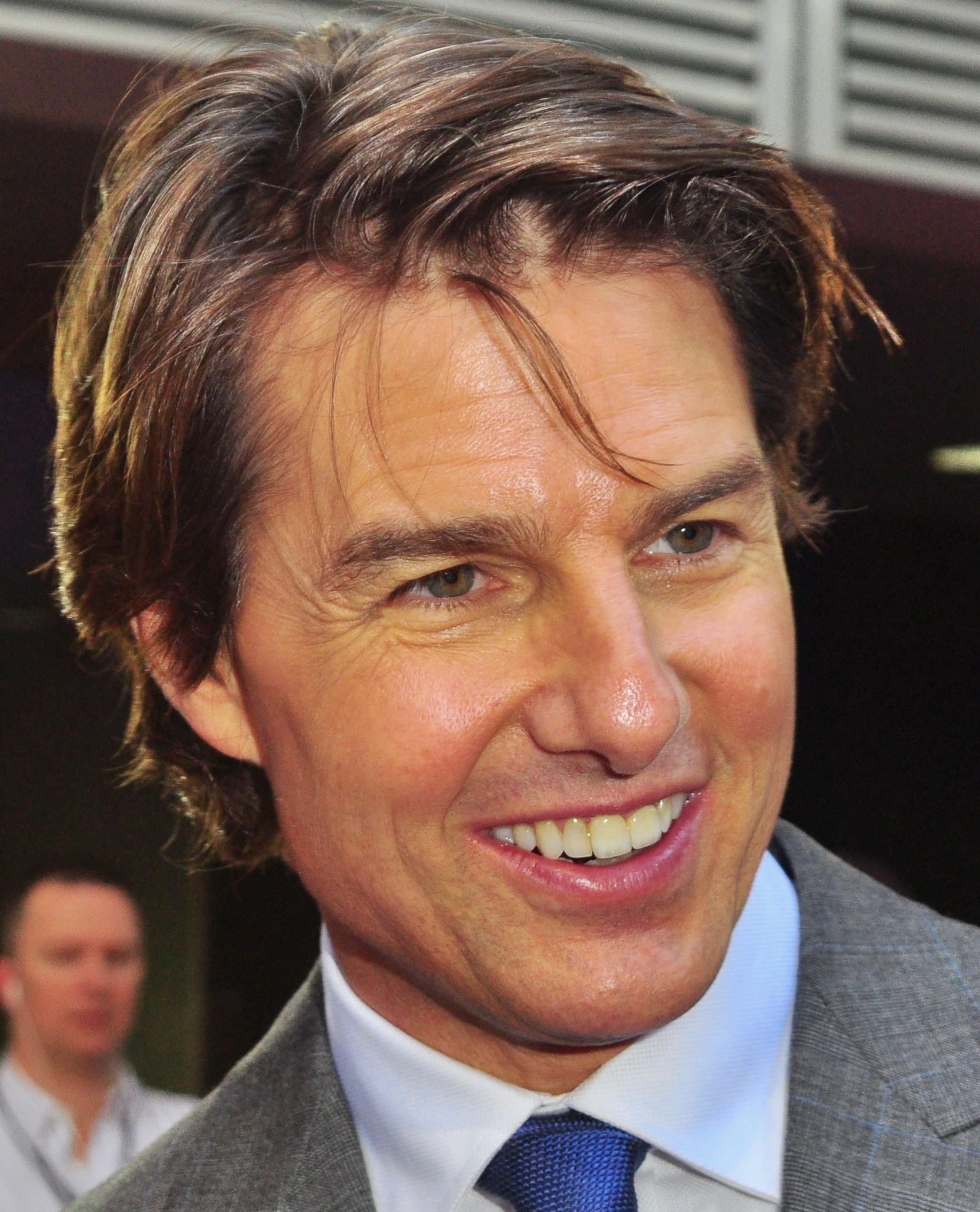
Tom Cruise

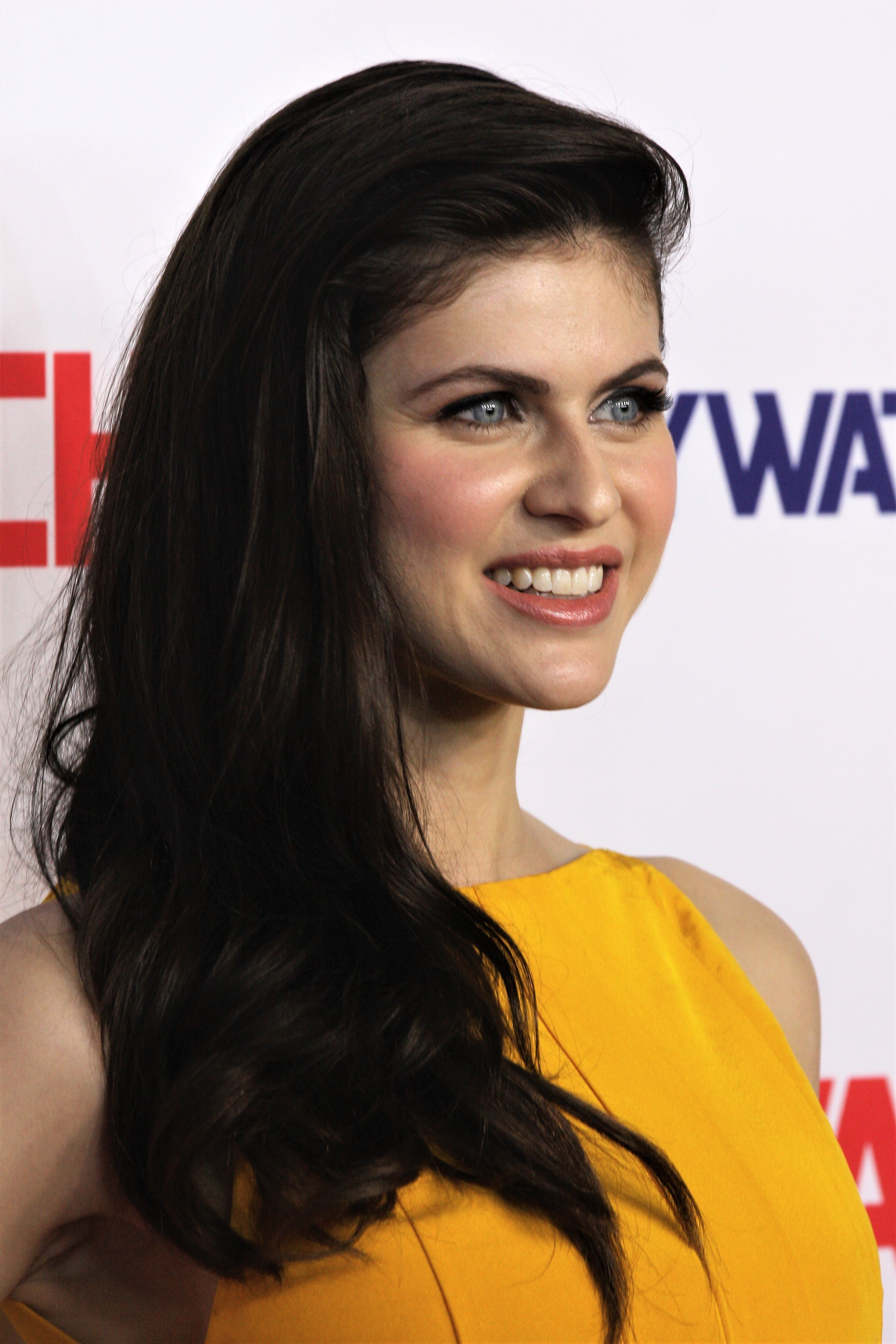
Alexandra Daddario

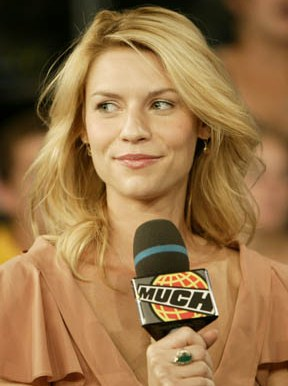
Claire Danes

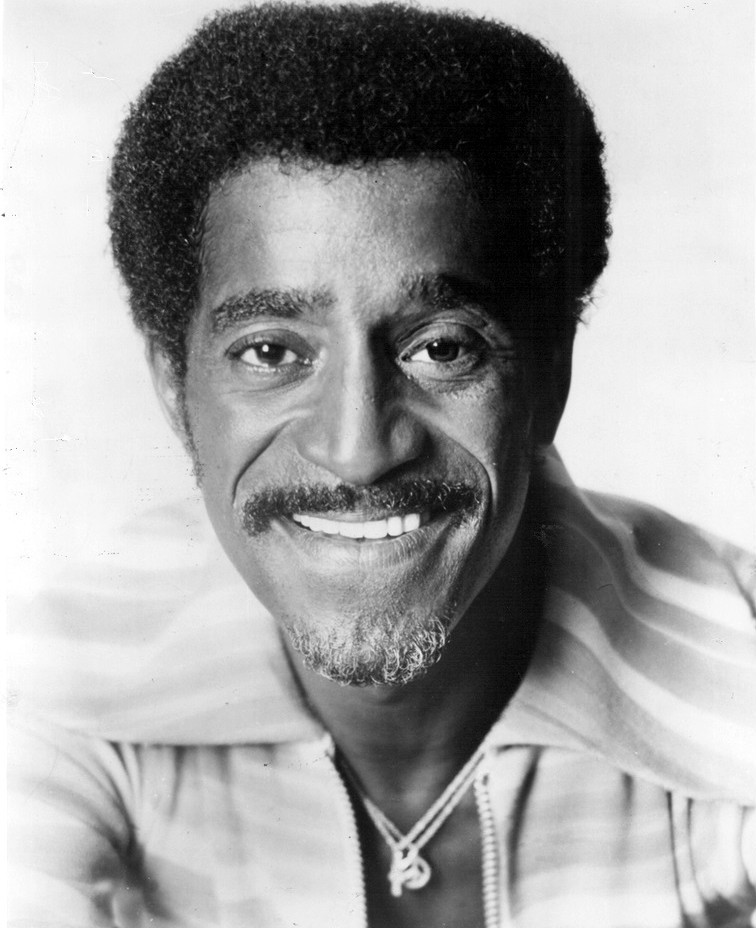
Sammy Davis Jr.

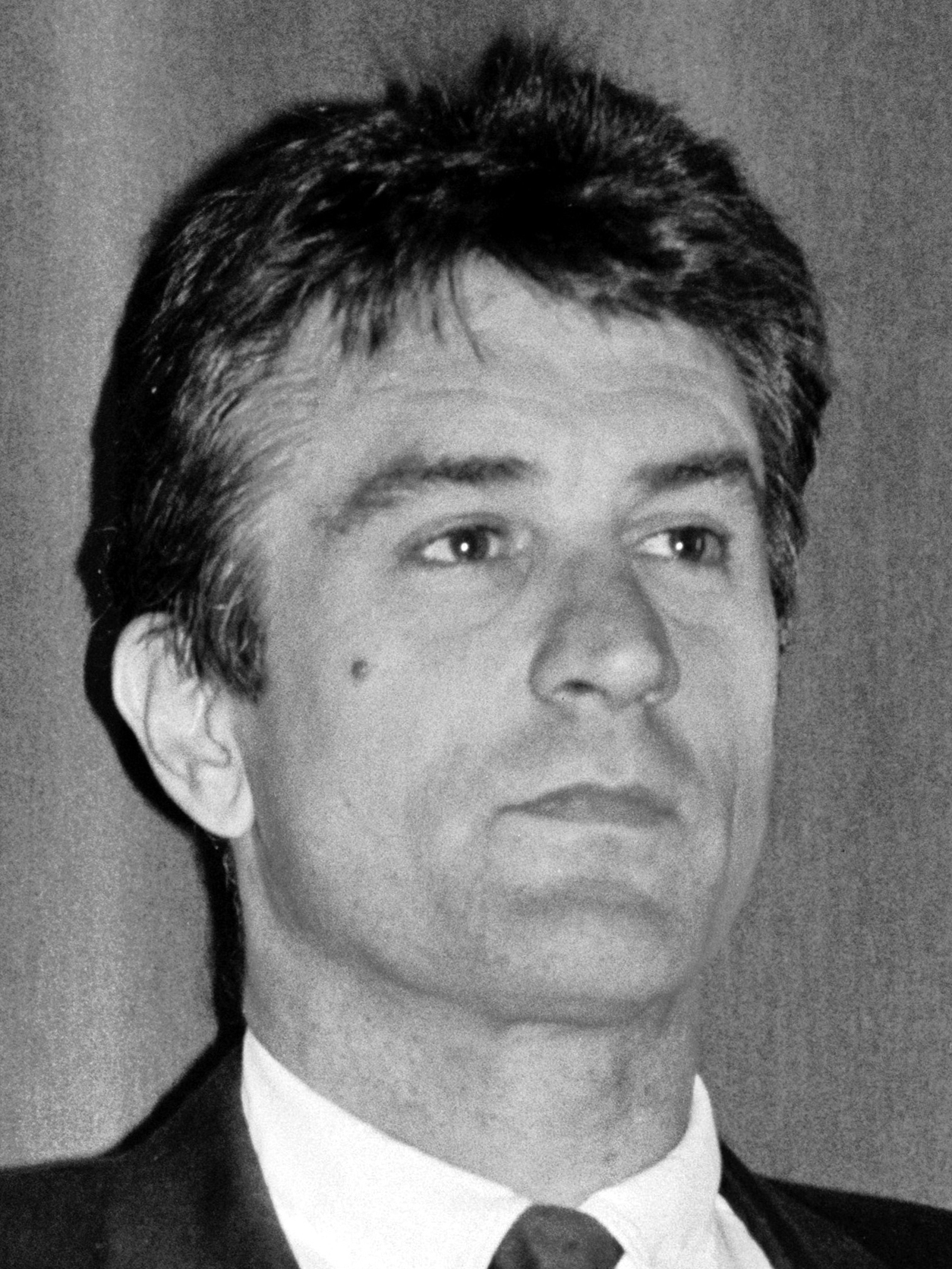
Robert De Niro

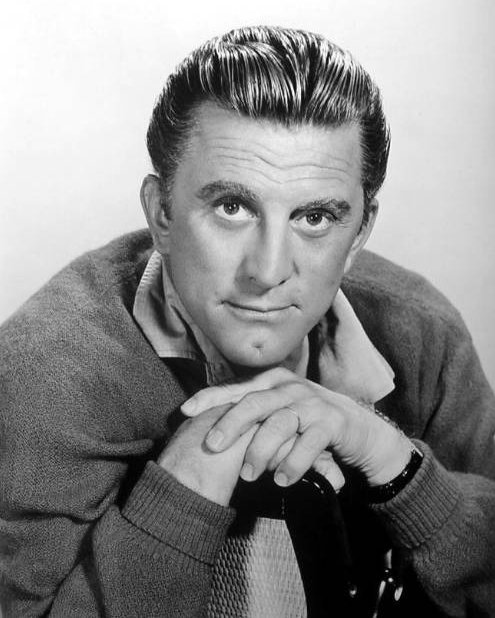
Kirk Douglas

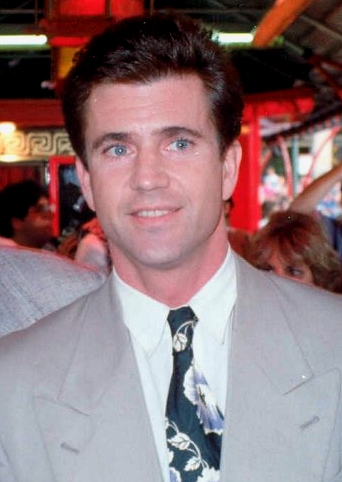
Mel Gibson

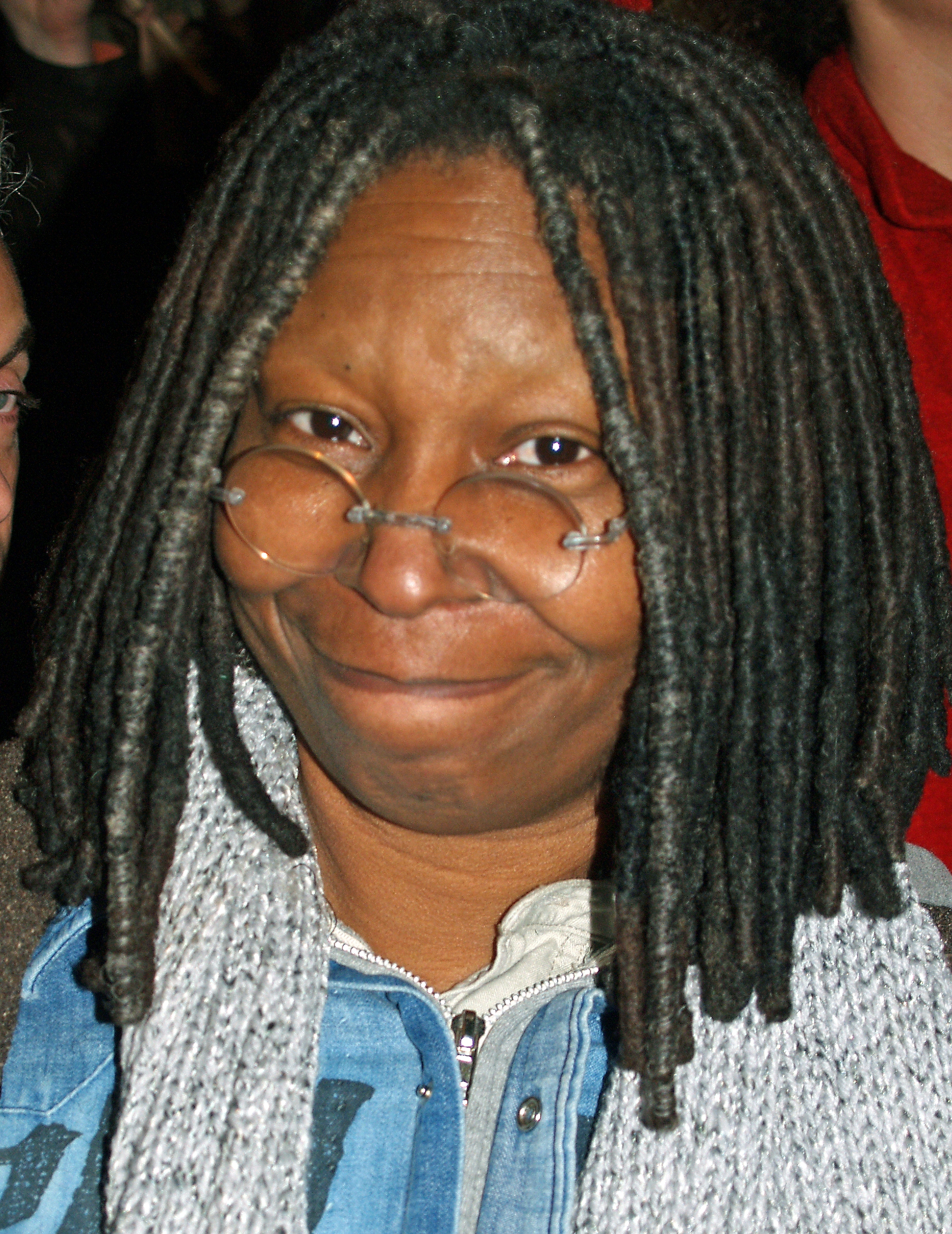
Whoopi Goldberg

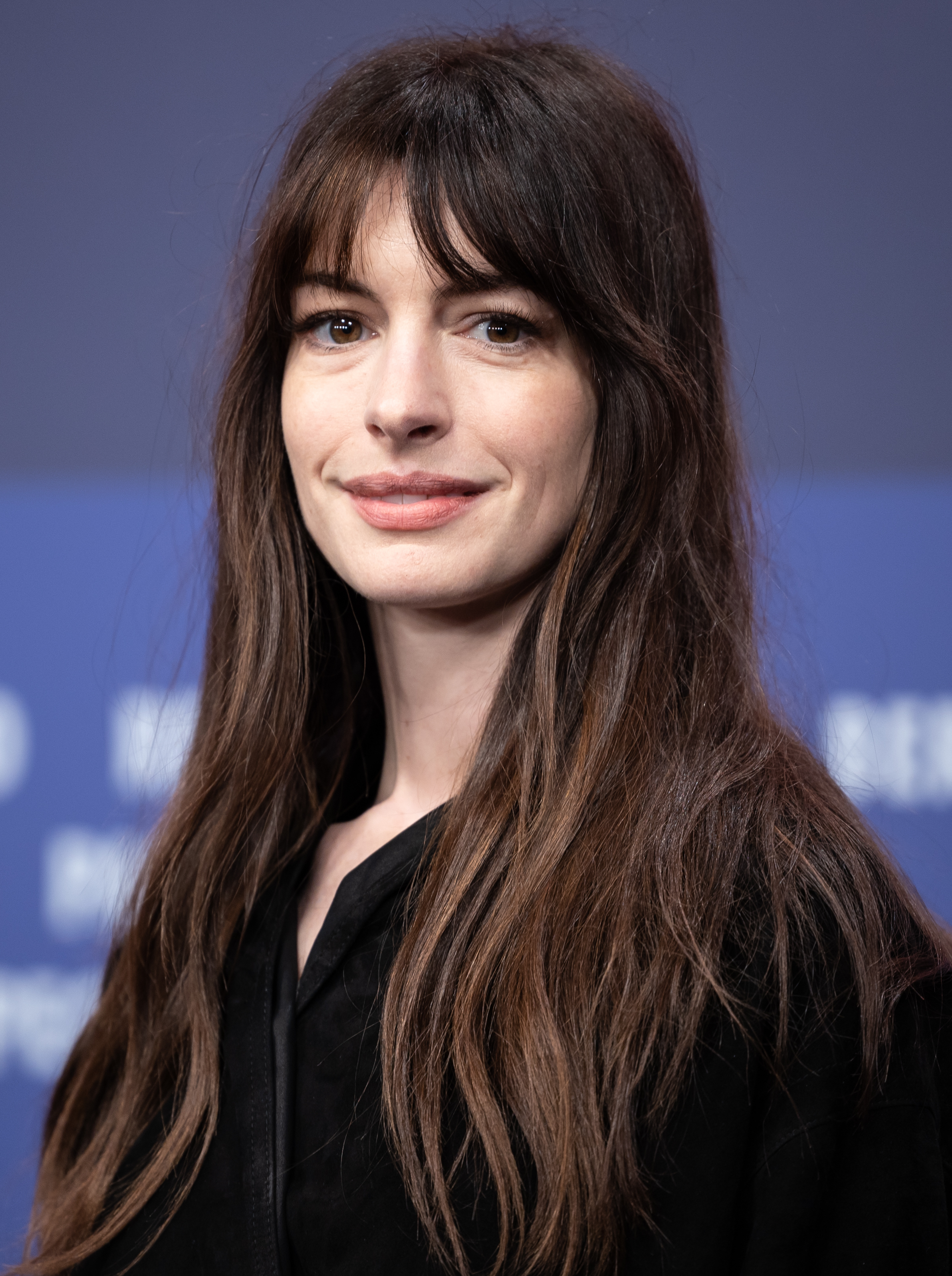
Anne Hathaway

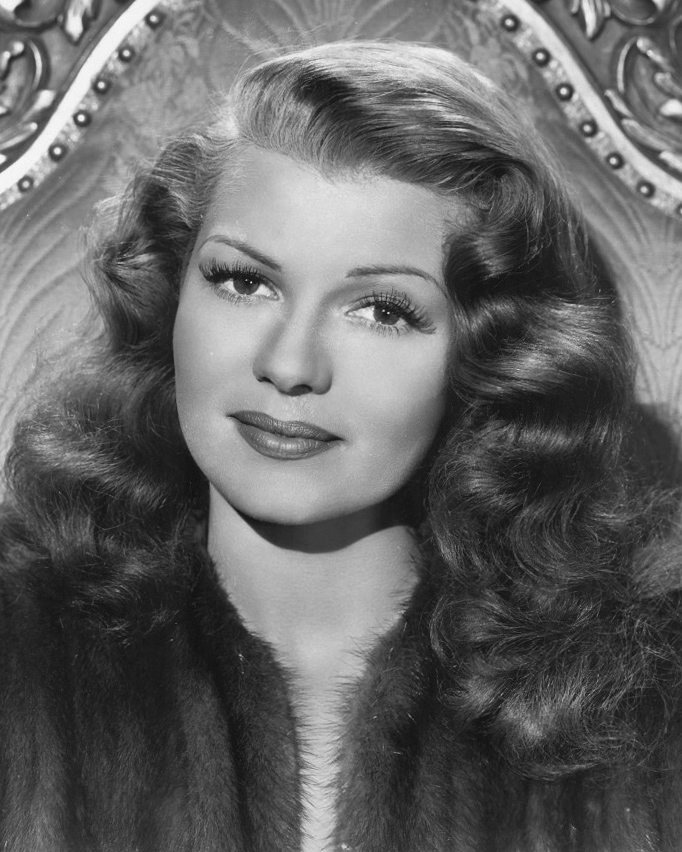
Rita Hayworth

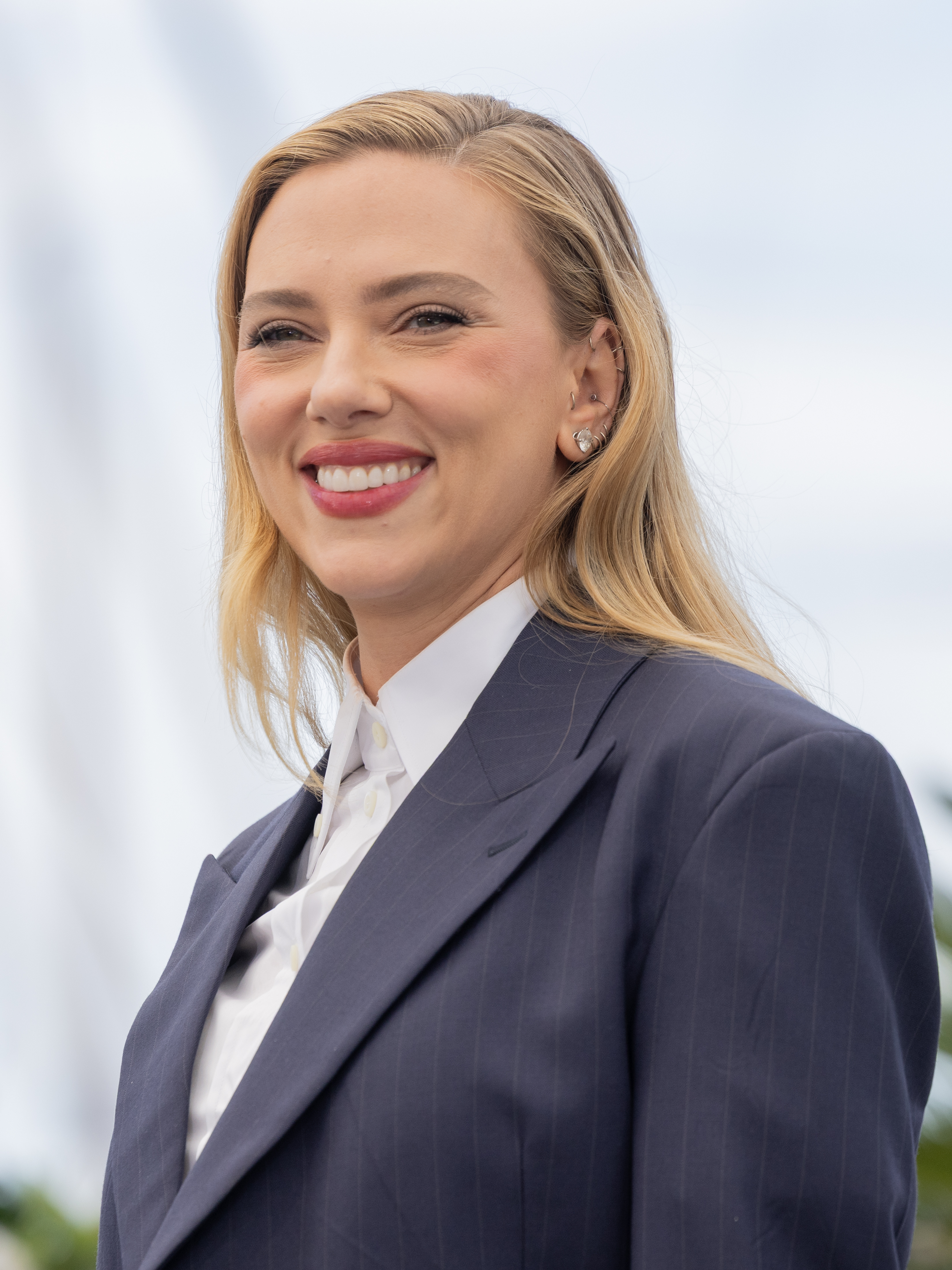
Scarlett Johansson

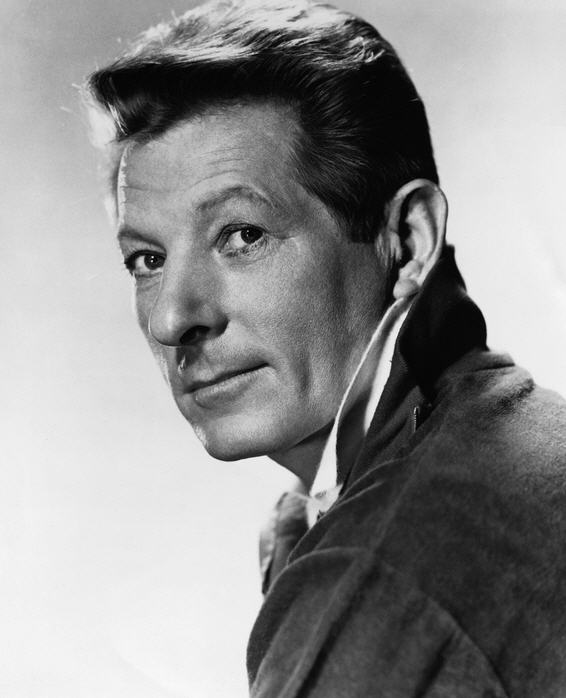
Danny Kaye

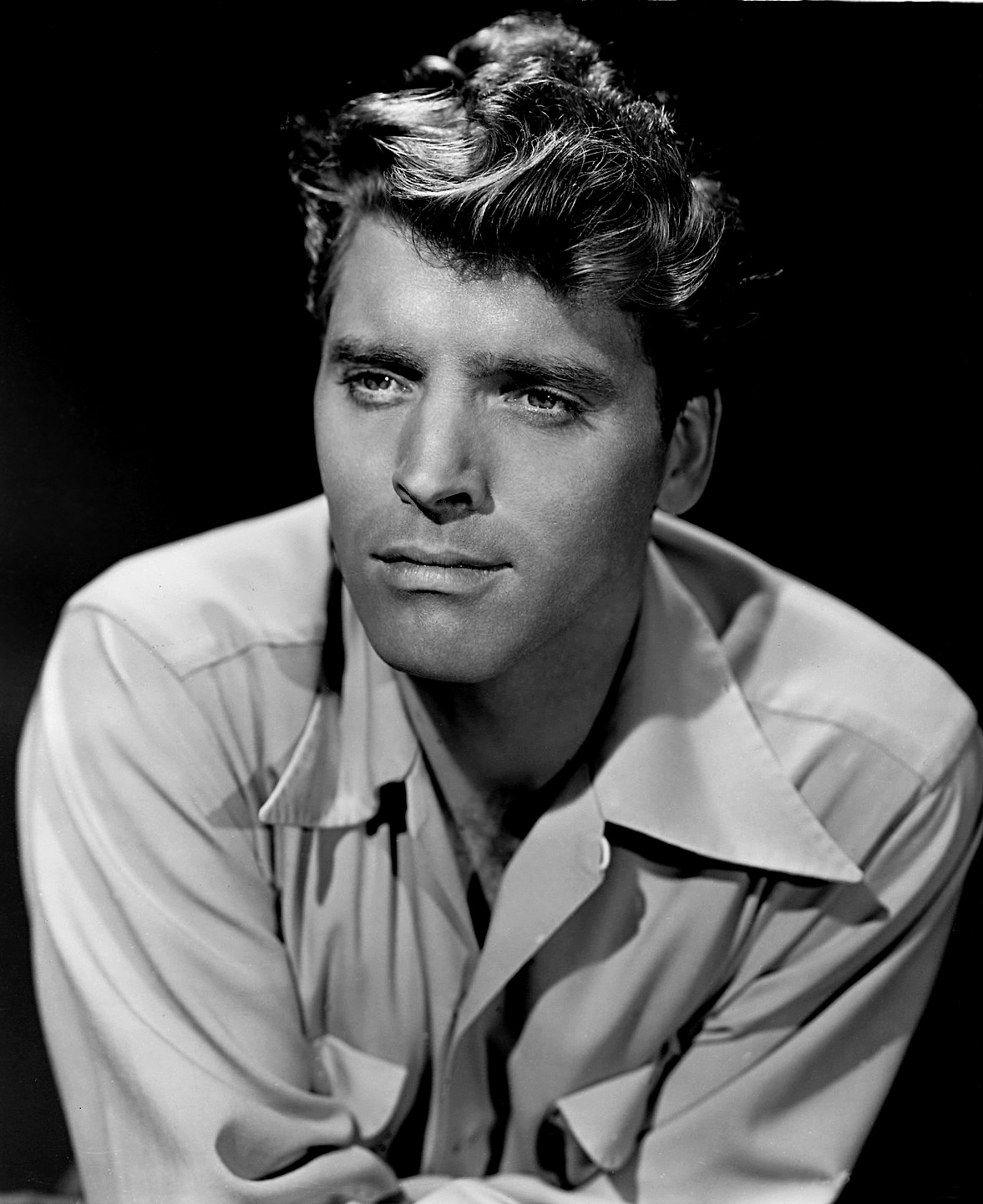
Burt Lancaster

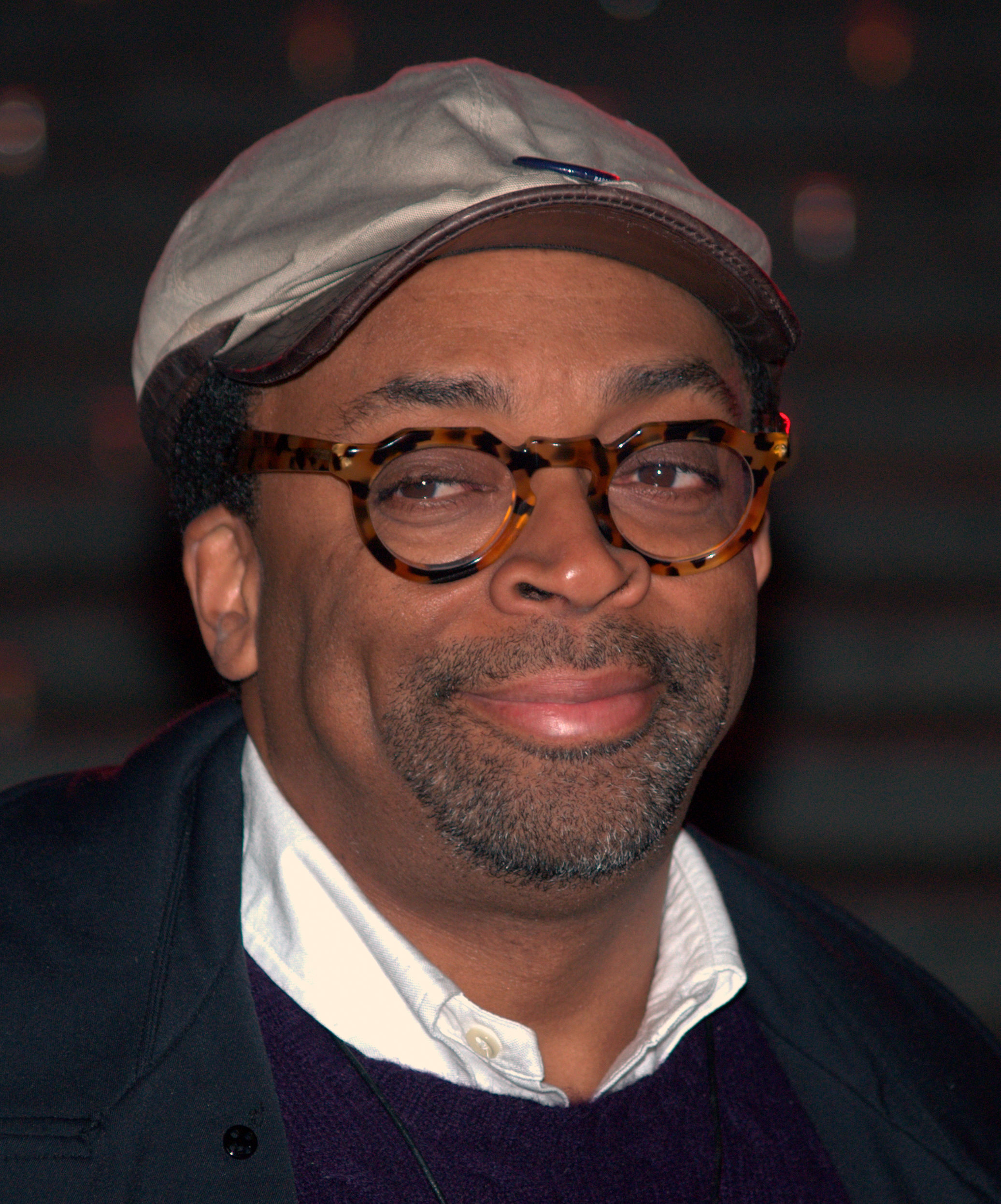
Spike Lee

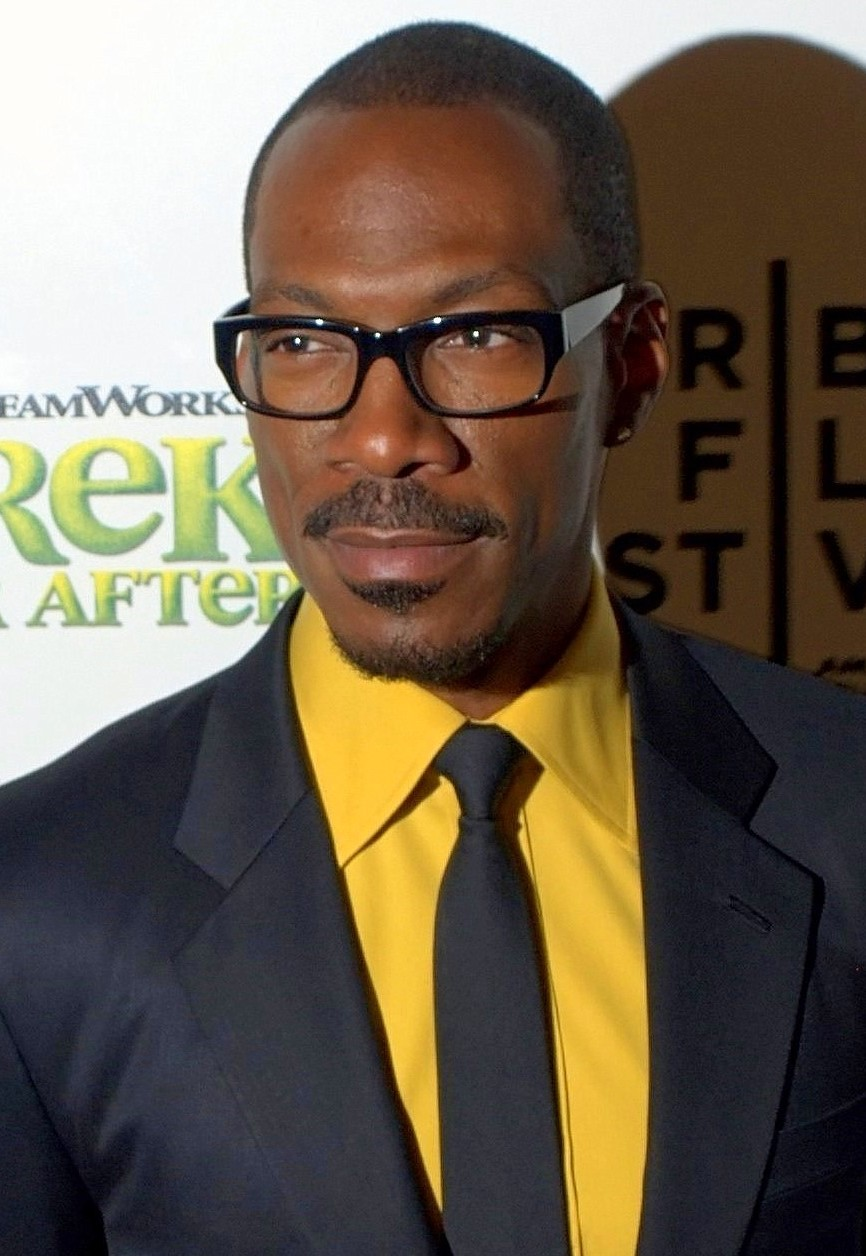
Eddie Murphy

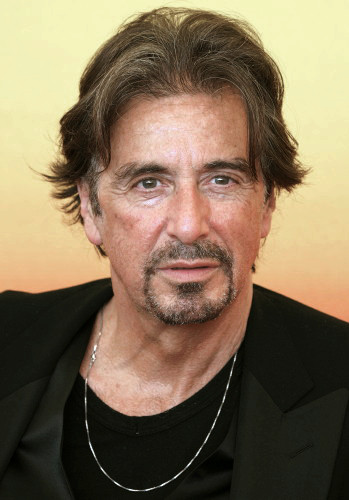
Al Pacino

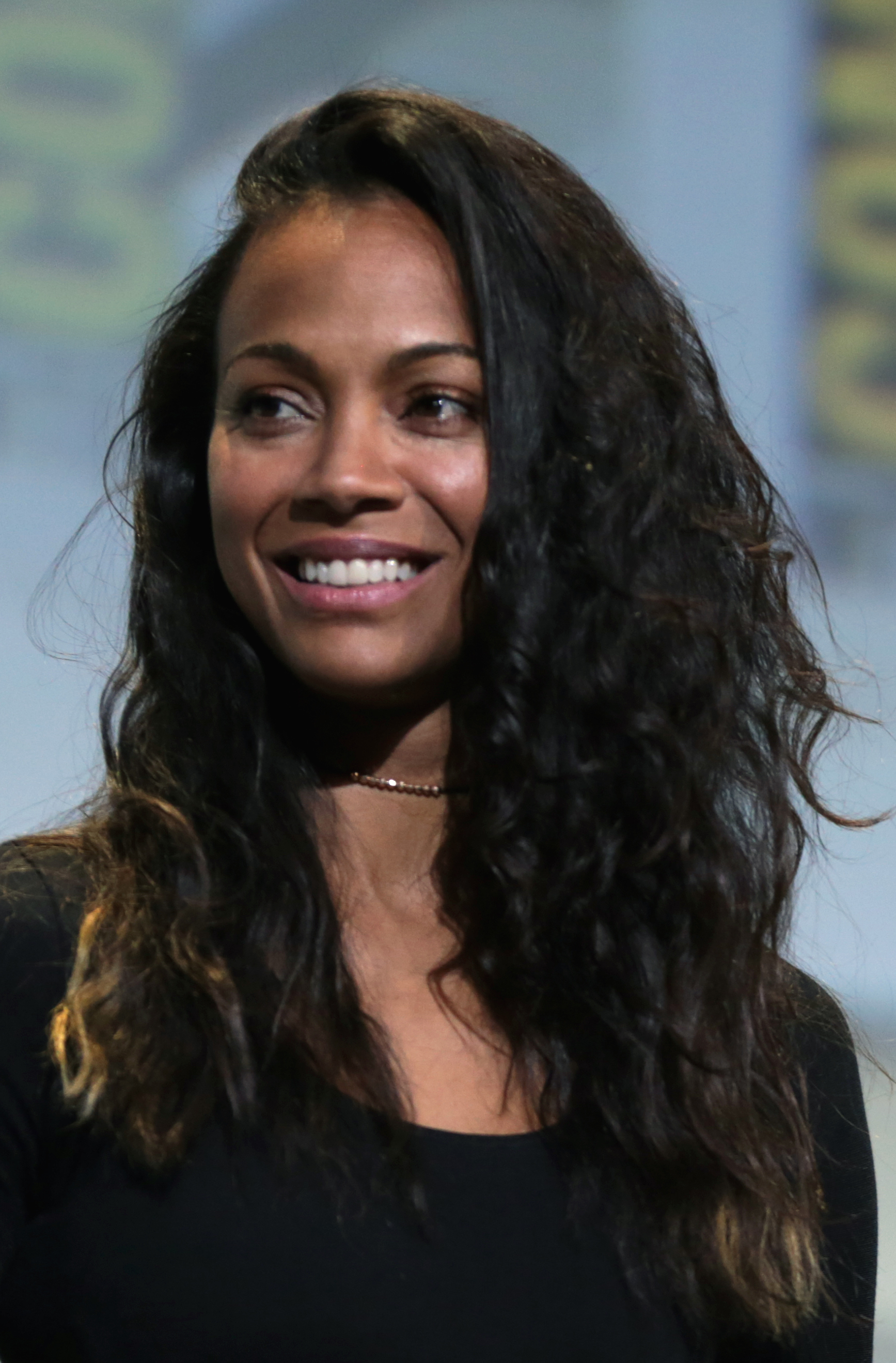
Zoe Saldaña

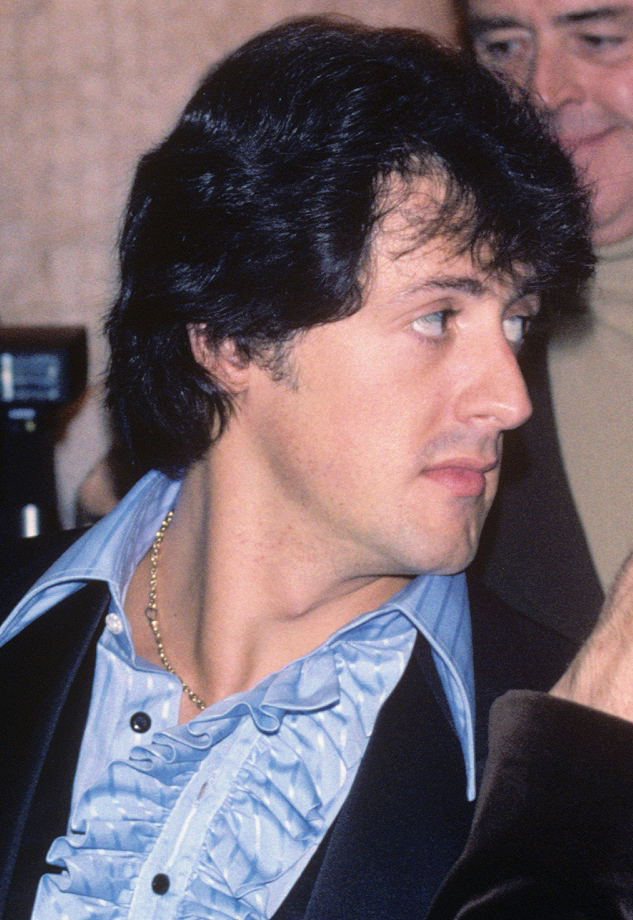
Sylvester Stallone

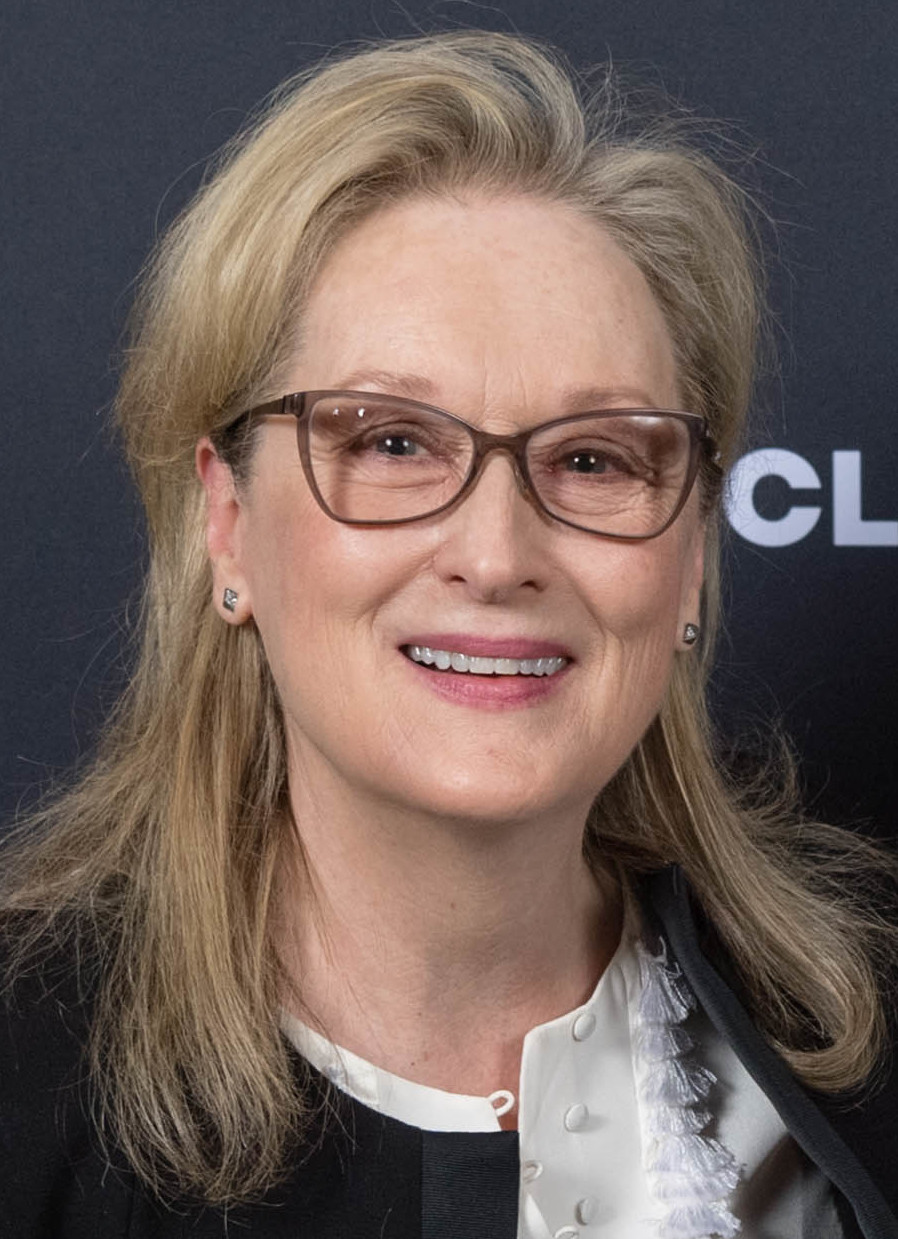
Meryl Streep

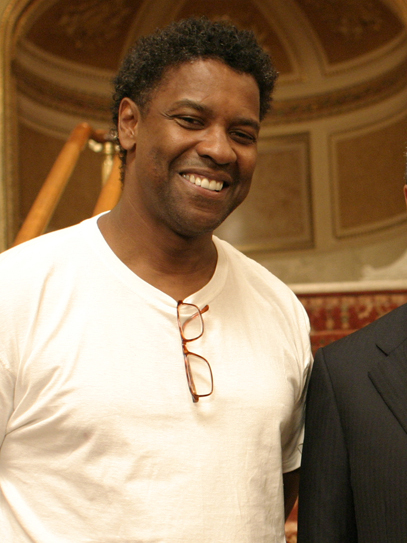
Denzel Washington

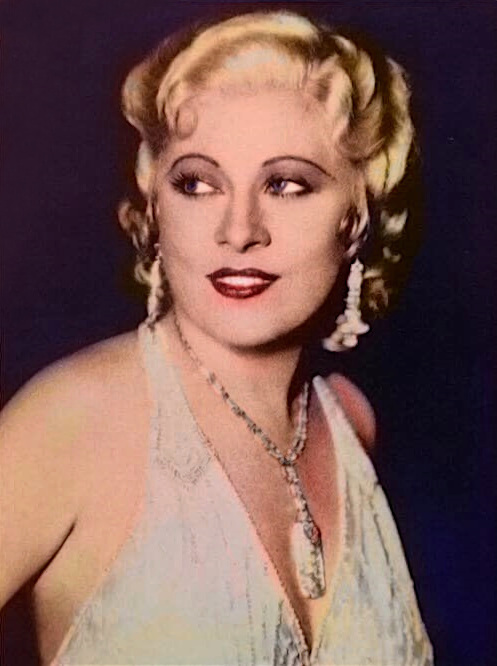
Mae West

- 2xrakai (2008) Twitch Streamer, Rapper
- George Abbott (1887–1995), stage producer
- Eva Allen Alberti (1856–1938), dramatics teacher
- Gia Allemand (1983–2013), actress
- Woody Allen (born Allan Konigsberg; 1935), actor, director, and writer
- Roger Allers (1949-2026), film-director, writer, artist, playwright
- June Allyson (1917–2006), actress
- Tyler Alvarez (born 1997), actor
- Michael Angarano (born 1987), actor
- Diane Arbus (1923–1971), photographer
- Moisés Arias (born 1994), actor
- Alan Arkin (1934–2023), actor
- Alison Arngrim (born 1962), actress and comedian
- Rosanna Arquette (born 1959), actress
- Jean Arthur (1900–1991), actress
- Jake T. Austin (born 1994), actor
- Lauren Bacall (born Betty Perske; 1924–2014), actress
- Morena Baccarin (born 1979), Brazilian-born actress
- Alec Baldwin (born 1958), actor, producer, and comedian
- Daniel Baldwin (born 1960), actor, director, and producer
- Stephen Baldwin (born 1966), actor, author, and producer
- William Baldwin (born 1963), actor, producer, and writer
- Lucille Ball (1911–1989), actress
- Anne Bancroft (1931–2005), actress
- Joseph Barbera (1911–2006), animator, producer, and director
- Mikhail Baryshnikov (born 1948), ballet dancer
- Frances Bavier (1902–1989), actor
- Barbara Bel Geddes (1922–2005), actress
- William Bendix (1906–1964), actor
- Constance Bennett (1904–1965), actress
- Matt Bennett (born 1991), actor
- Mabelle Biggart (1861–unknown), dramatic reader, preacher
- Ed Bishop (1932-2005), actor
- Yasmine Bleeth (born 1968), actress
- Corbin Bleu (born 1989), actor and singer
- Joan Blondell (1906–1979), actress
- Nikki Blonsky (born 1988), actress
- Ann Blyth (1927-2026), actress
- Humphrey Bogart (1899–1957), actor
- Shirley Booth (1898–1992), actress
- Clara Bow (1905–1965), actress
- Abigail Breslin (born 1996), actress
- Spencer Breslin (born 1992), actor
- Richard Bright (1937–2006), actor
- Matthew Broderick (born 1962), actor
- Adrien Brody (born 1973), actor
- Mel Brooks (born Kaminsky; 1926), actor, producer, and director
- Steve Buscemi (born 1957), actor, comedian, and director
- Edd Byrnes (1932–2020), actor
- James Caan (1940–2022), actor
- James Cagney (1899–1986), actor
- Jeanne Cagney (1919–1984), actress
- William Cagney (1905–1988), actor
- Néstor Carbonell (born 1967), actor and director
- Richard S. Castellano (1933–1988), actor
- David Castro (born 1996), actor
- Raquel Castro (born 1994), actress, singer, and songwriter
- Kai Cenat (born 2001), Twitch Streamer, Actor, Rapper
- Harrison Chad (born 1992), actor and voice actor
- Timothée Chalamet (born 1995), actor
- Jeff Chandler (1918–1961), actor
- Chevy Chase (born 1943), actor and comedian
- Ruth Chatterton (1892–1961), actress
- James Coco (1930–1987), actor
- Claudette Colbert (1903–1996), actress
- Jennifer Connelly (born 1970), actress and model
- Elizabeth Marney Conner (1856–unknown), dramatic reader
- Kevin Conroy (1955–2022), actor and voice actor
- Francis Ford Coppola (born 1939), film director, producer, and screenwriter
- Kevin Corrigan (born 1969), actor
- Billy Crudup (born 1968), actor
- Tom Cruise (born 1962), actor
- Jon Cryer (born 1965), actor, screenwriter, television director, and film producer
- Billy Crystal (born 1948), actor
- Kieran Culkin (born 1982), actor
- Macaulay Culkin (born 1980), actor, Kevin McAllister from Home Alone
- Rory Culkin (born 1989), actor
- Tony Curtis (born Bernard Schwartz; 1925–2010), actor
- Alexandra Daddario (born 1986), actress
- Matthew Daddario (born 1987), actor
- Claire Danes (born 1979), actress
- Rodney Dangerfield (born Jacob Cohen; 1921–2004), comedian and actor
- Marion Davies (1897–1961), actress
- Sammy Davis Jr. (1925–1990), actor and singer
- Agnes de Mille (1905–1993), dancer and choreographer
- Robert De Niro (born 1943), actor
- Willy DeVille (1950–2009), singer
- Don Diamont (born 1962), actor
- Guillermo Díaz (born 1975), Cuban-American actor
- Vin Diesel (born 1967), actor, producer, director, and screenwriter
- Ella Dietz (1847–1920), actress, poet
- Taye Diggs (born 1971), actor
- Matt Dillon (born 1964), actor
- Troy Donahue (1936–2001), actor
- Kether Donohue (born 1985), actress and singer
- Kirk Douglas (1916–2020), actor and father of Michael Douglas
- Michael Douglas (born 1944), actor, producer, and son of Kirk Douglas
- Robert Downey Jr. (born 1965), actor
- Robert Downey Sr. (1936–2021), actor, filmmaker, and father of Robert Downey Jr.
- Fran Drescher (born 1957), actress
- Lena Dunham (born 1986), actress, filmmaker, and writer
- Jimmy Durante (1893–1980), entertainer, actor, singer, and comedian
- Jesse Eisenberg (born 1983), actor
- Omar Epps (born 1973), actor
- Peter Falk (1927–2011), actor
- Alice Faye (1915–1998), actress
- Jane Fonda (born 1937), actress
- Spencer Fox (born 1993), actor
- James Gandolfini (1961–2013), actor and producer
- John Garfield (born Jacob Garfinkle; 1913–1952), actor
- Alex Garfin (born 2004), actor
- Ben Gazzara (1930–2012), actor
- Sarah Michelle Gellar (born 1977), actress
- Richard Genelle (1961–2008), actor
- Mel Gibson (born 1956), American-born Australian/Irish actor and filmmaker
- Jackie Gleason (1916–1987), actor
- Paulette Goddard (1910–1990), actress
- Whoopi Goldberg (born 1955), actress, comedian, and co-host of ABC's The View
- Cuba Gooding Jr. (born 1968), Academy Award-winning actor
- Elliott Gould (born Goldstein; 1938), actor
- Erin Gray (born 1950), actress
- Jennifer Grey (born 1960), actress
- Jason Griffith (born 1980), voice actor
- A. R. Gurney (1930–2017), playwright
- Maggie Gyllenhaal (born 1977), actress
- Margaret Hamilton (1902-1985), actress
- Estelle Harris (née Nussbaum; 1928–2022), actress, voice actress, and comedian
- Jonathan Harris (born Charasuchin; 1914–2002), actor
- Hurd Hatfield (1917–1998), actor
- Anne Hathaway (born 1982), actress
- Maya Hawke (born 1998), actress, model and singer-songwriter
- Susan Hayward (1917–1975), actress
- Rita Hayworth (1918–1987), actress
- Kathleen Herles (born 1990), voice actress
- Philip Seymour Hoffman (1967–2014), actor
- Judy Holliday (1921–1965), actress
- Whitney Houston (1963–2012), singer, actress, producer, and model
- Sarah Hyland (born 1990), actress
- Skai Jackson (born 2002), actress
- Rick Jason (1923–2000), actor
- Scarlett Johansson (born 1984), actress, model, and singer
- Jason Harris Katz (born 1969), voice actor and television host
- Danny Kaye (born Kaminsky; 1911–1987), actor, comedian, singer, and dancer
- Jack Kelly (1927–1992), actor
- Moira Kelly (born 1968), actress
- Margot Kidder (1948-2018), actress
- Morgana King (1930–2018), singer and actress
- Wayne Knight (born 1955), actor, voice artist, and comedian
- Ricki Lake (born 1968), actress, talk-show host
- Veronica Lake (1922–1973), actress
- Adam Lamberg (born 1984), actor
- Burt Lancaster (1913–1994), actor
- Michael Landon (born Eugene Orowitz; 1936–1991), actor
- Linda Larkin (born 1970), actress and voice actress
- Fredric Lebow (born 1956), screenwriter
- Peyton Elizabeth Lee (born 2004), actress
- Spike Lee (born 1957), director, producer
- Melissa Leo (born 1960), actress
- Laura Linney (born 1964)
- John Lithgow (born 1945), actor, comedian
- Aliana Lohan (born 1993), actress, singer and sister of actors Lindsay and Michael Lohan Jr.
- Lindsay Lohan (born 1986), actress, singer and sister of actors Ali and Michael Lohan Jr.
- Kristanna Loken (born 1979), actress
- Seth MacFarlane (born 1973), actor, writer, producer, and creator of Family Guy
- Steele MacKaye (1842–1894), playwright and actor
- John Marley (1907–1984), actor
- Vincent Martella (born 1992), actor
- John Martino (born 1937), actor
- Lee Marvin (1924–1987), actor
- James Maslow (born 1990), actor, singer, and dancer
- Alanna Masterson (born 1988), actress
- Christopher Masterson (born 1980), actor
- Danny Masterson (born 1976), actor
- Walter Matthau (1920–2000), actor
- Al Matthews (1942–2018), actor and singer
- Julianna Rose Mauriello (born 1991), actress and dancer
- Eaddy Mays, actress
- Jesse McCartney (born 1987), actor, singer-songwriter
- Thomas McDonell (born 1986), actor
- Michael McKean (born 1947), comedian, actor and musician
- Caleb McLaughlin (born 2001), actor
- Ethel Merman (1908–1984), actor and singer
- Lea Michele (born 1986), actress and singer
- Arthur Miller (1915–2005), playwright
- Lenny Montana (1926–1992), actor and professional wrestler
- Robert Montgomery (1904–1981), actor
- Charlie Murphy (1959–2017), actor and comedian
- Chad Michael Murray (born 1981), actor
- Jack Nicholson (born 1937), actor and filmmaker
- Dylan O'Brien (born 1991), actor
- Cameron Ocasio (born 1999), actor
- Jerry O'Connell (born 1974), actor
- Eugene O'Neill (1888–1953), playwright
- Lane Shi Otayonii, musician
- Al Pacino (born 1940), actor
- Hayden Panettiere (1989-2026), actress, model, singer, and activist
- Jansen Panettiere (born 1994), actor and voice actor
- Connor Paolo (born 1990), actor
- Corey Parker (born 1965), actor
- George A. Parkhurst (1841–1890), actor
- Josh Peck (born 1986), actor
- Amanda Peet (born 1972), actress and writer
- Nicola Peltz (born 1995), actress
- Will Peltz (born 1986), actor
- Anthony Perkins (1932–1992), actor
- Regis Philbin (1931–2020), actor, singer, and television personality
- Sidney Poitier (1927-2022), actor
- Priscilla Presley (born 1945), actress and business magnate
- Fátima Ptacek (born 2000), actress and voice actress
- Bill Pullman (born 1953), actor
- Mae Questel (1908–1998), actress
- George Raft (1901–1980), actor
- Gene Anthony Ray (1962–2003), actor
- Nancy Reagan (1921–2016), actress and former First Lady of the United States
- Alan Reed (1907–1977), actor and voice artist
- Christopher Reeve (1952–2004), actor
- Dana Reeve (1961-2006), actress and singer
- Tara Reid (born 1975), actress
- Rob Reiner (1947-2025), actor, director, screenwriter
- Leah Remini (born 1970), actress
- Alfonso Ribeiro (born 1971), actor, television director, dancer, and television personality; host of America's Funniest Home Videos and season 19 winner of Dancing with the Stars
- Thelma Ritter (1902–1969), actress
- Emma Roberts (born 1991), actress and singer
- Edward G. Robinson (born Emanuel Goldenberg; 1893–1973), actor
- Ray Romano (born 1957), actor, comedian
- Saoirse Ronan (born 1994), American-born Irish actress
- Mickey Rooney (1920–2014), actor
- Emmy Rossum (born 1986), actress, singer-songwriter
- Mickey Rourke (born 1952), actor, screenwriter, and retired boxer
- Paul Rudd (born 1969), actor, comedian, writer, and producer
- Gianni Russo, actor, singer, and restaurateur
- Talia Ryder (born 2002), actress
- Ernie Sabella (born 1949), actor and voice actor
- Zoe Saldaña (born 1978), American-Dominican actress and dancer
- Ruben Santiago-Hudson (born 1956), actor and playwright
- Ben Schwartz (born 1981), actor, comedian, and writer
- Martin Scorsese (born 1942), director
- George Segal (1934–2021), actor
- Matthew Senreich (born 1974), screenwriter
- Charlie Sheen (born 1965), actor
- Talia Shire (née Coppola), actress
- Sylvia Sidney (1910–1999), actress
- Christian Slater (born 1969), actor
- Jamil Walker Smith (born 1982), actor
- Kevin Spacey (born 1959), actor, film director, producer, screenwriter, and singer
- Sylvester Stallone (born 1946), actor, screenwriter, producer, and director
- Barbara Stanwyck (1907–1990), actor
- Rod Steiger (1925–2002), actor
- Howard Stern (born 1954), actor, radio and television personality, author, and photographer
- Ben Stiller (born 1965), actor, comedian, and filmmaker
- Oliver Stone (born 1946), director
- Beatrice Straight (1914–2001), actress
- Lee Strasberg (1901–1982), Polish-born actor, director, and theatre practitioner
- Meryl Streep (born 1949) actress
- David Strickland (1969–1999), actor
- Kevin Sussman (born 1970), actor and comedian
- Veronica Taylor (born 1978), voice actress
- Benj Thall (born 1978), actor
- Leon Thomas III (born 1993), actor
- Charlotte Thompson (1843–1898), actress
- Gene Tierney (1920–1991), actress
- Ashley Tisdale (born 1985), actress, singer, and producer
- Michelle Trachtenberg (1985–2025), actress
- Claire Trevor (1910–2000), actress
- John Turturro (born 1958), American-Italian actor, writer, and filmmaker
- Abe Vigoda (1921–2016), actor
- Denzel Washington (born 1954), Academy Award-winning actor
- Kerry Washington (born 1977), actress
- Michael Weatherly (born 1968), actor and director
- Scott Weinger (born 1975), actor, voice actor, writer, and producer
- Tuesday Weld (born 1943), actress
- Tom Welling (born 1977), actor, director, producer, and model
- Ming-Na Wen (born 1963), Macau-born actress and model
- Mae West (1893–1980), actor
- Kristen Wiig (born 1973), actress
- Olivia Wilde (born 1984), actress
- Tylen Jacob Williams (born 2001), actor
- Tyler James Williams (born 1992), actor
- Tyrel Jackson Williams (born 1997), actor
- Zelda Williams (born 1989), actress; daughter of late comedian and actor Robin Williams
- Lanford Wilson (1937–2011), playwright
- April Winchell (born 1960), actress
- Paul Winchell (born Wilchinsky;1922–2005), actor and comedian
- Alex Wolff (born 1997), actor, musician, and composer
- Nick Zano (born 1978), actor

=== Comedians, entertainers, and humorists ===
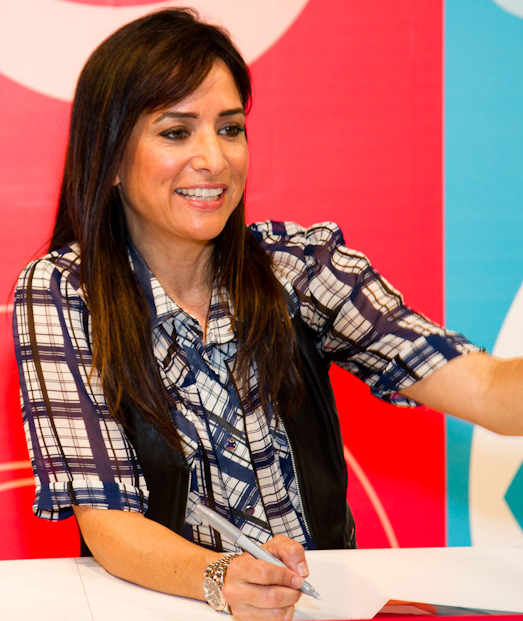
Pamela Adlon

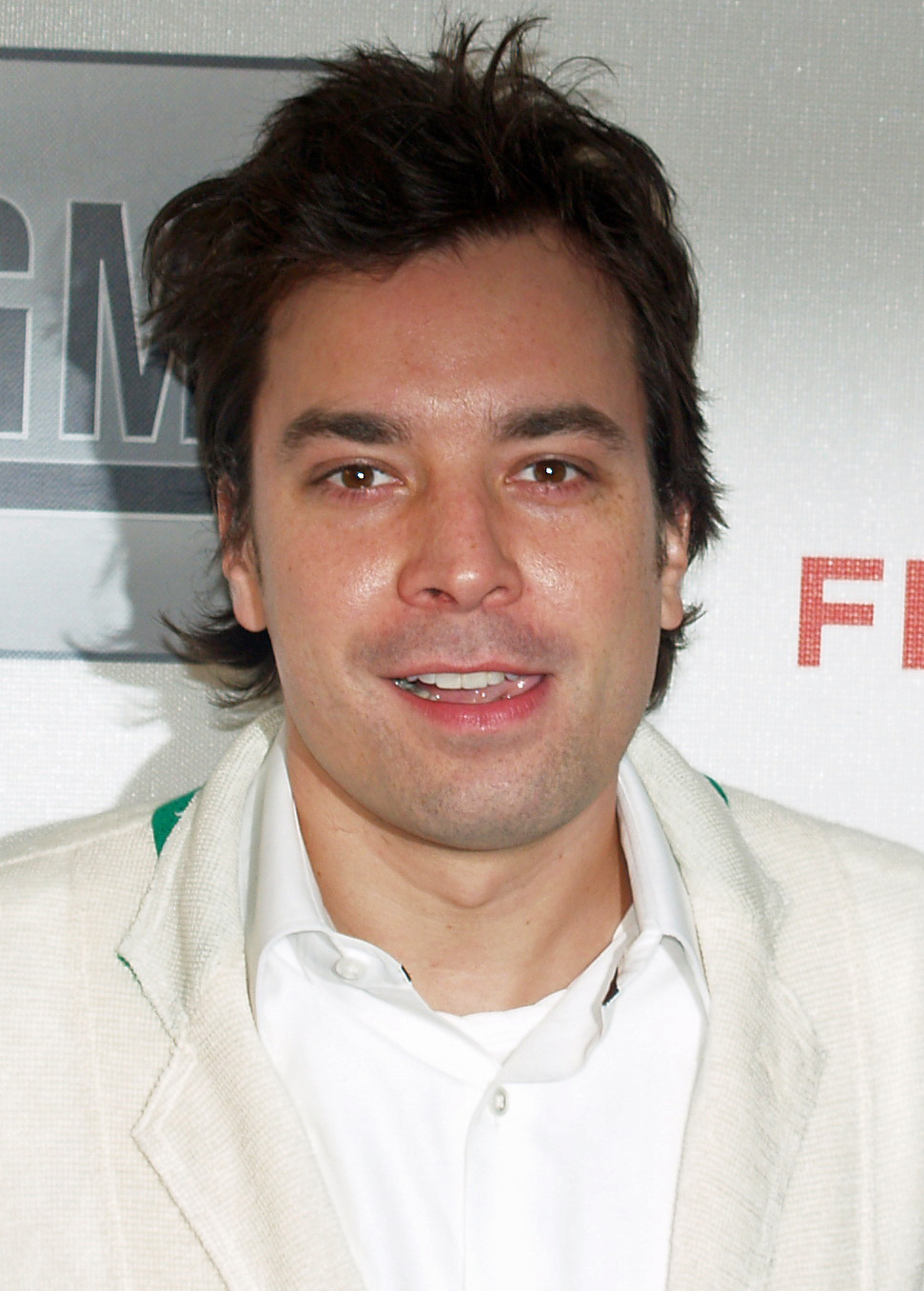
Jimmy Fallon

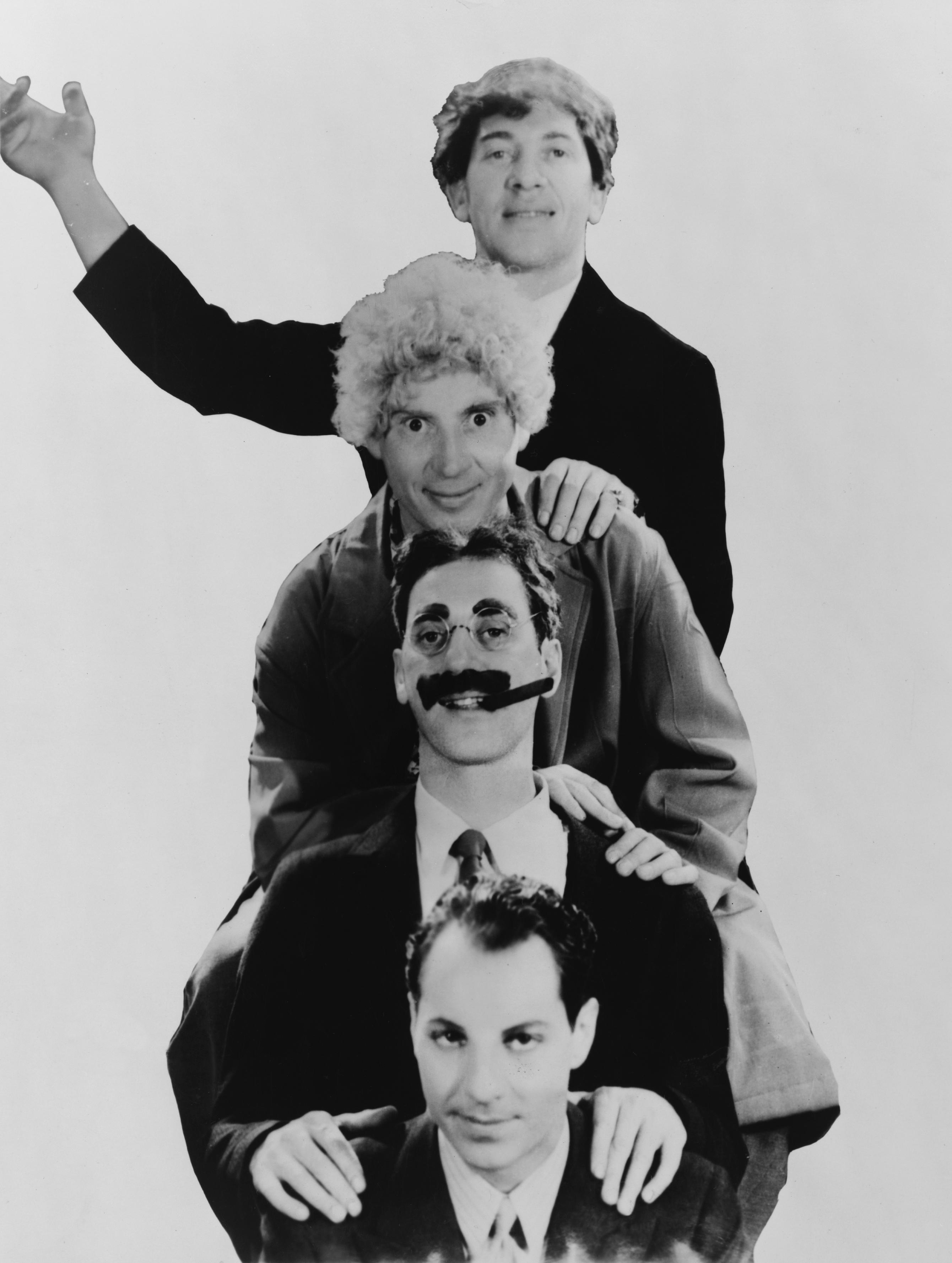
The Marx Brothers

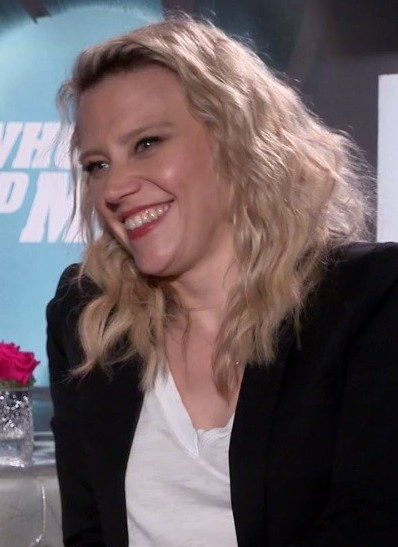
Kate McKinnon

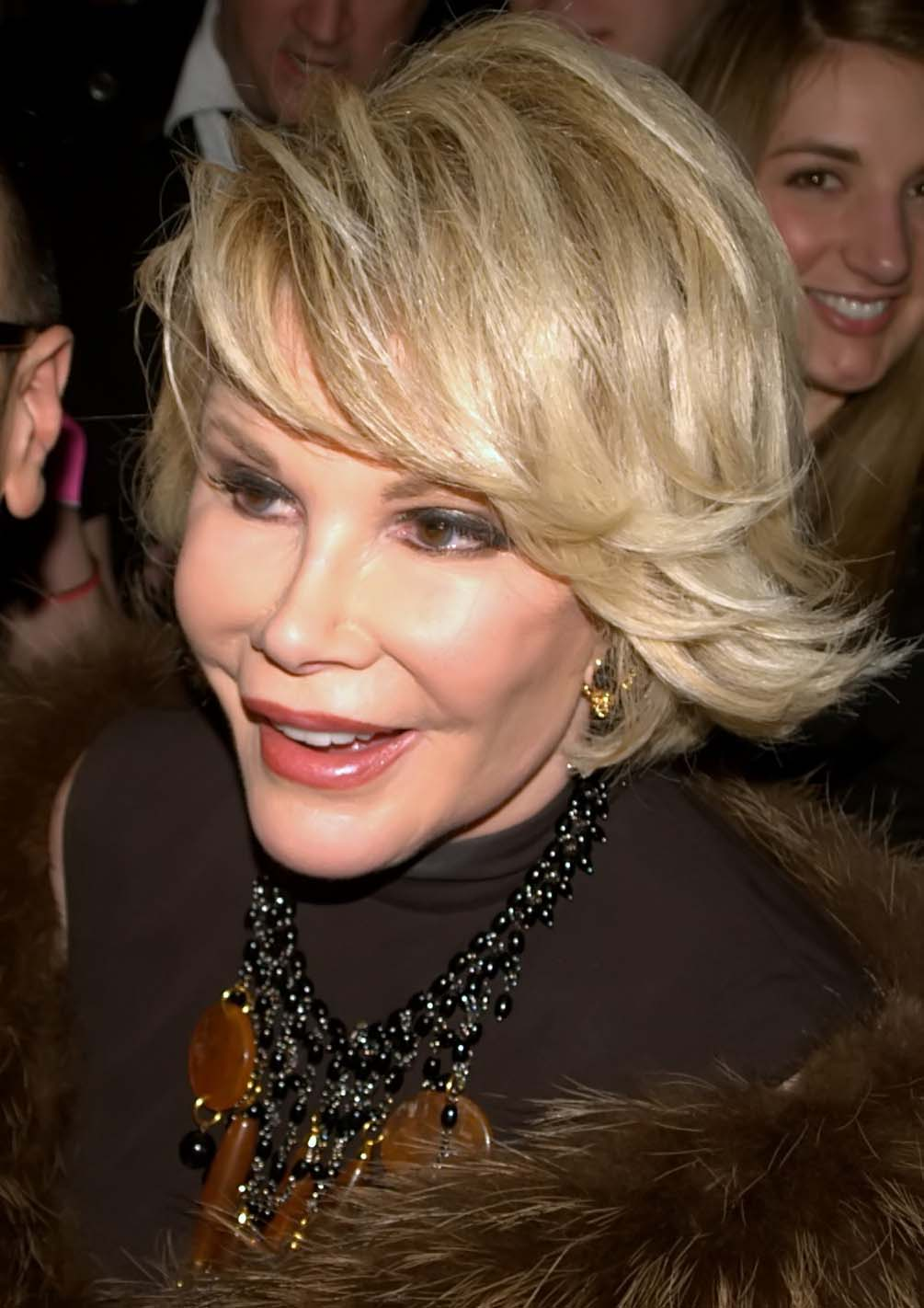
Joan Rivers

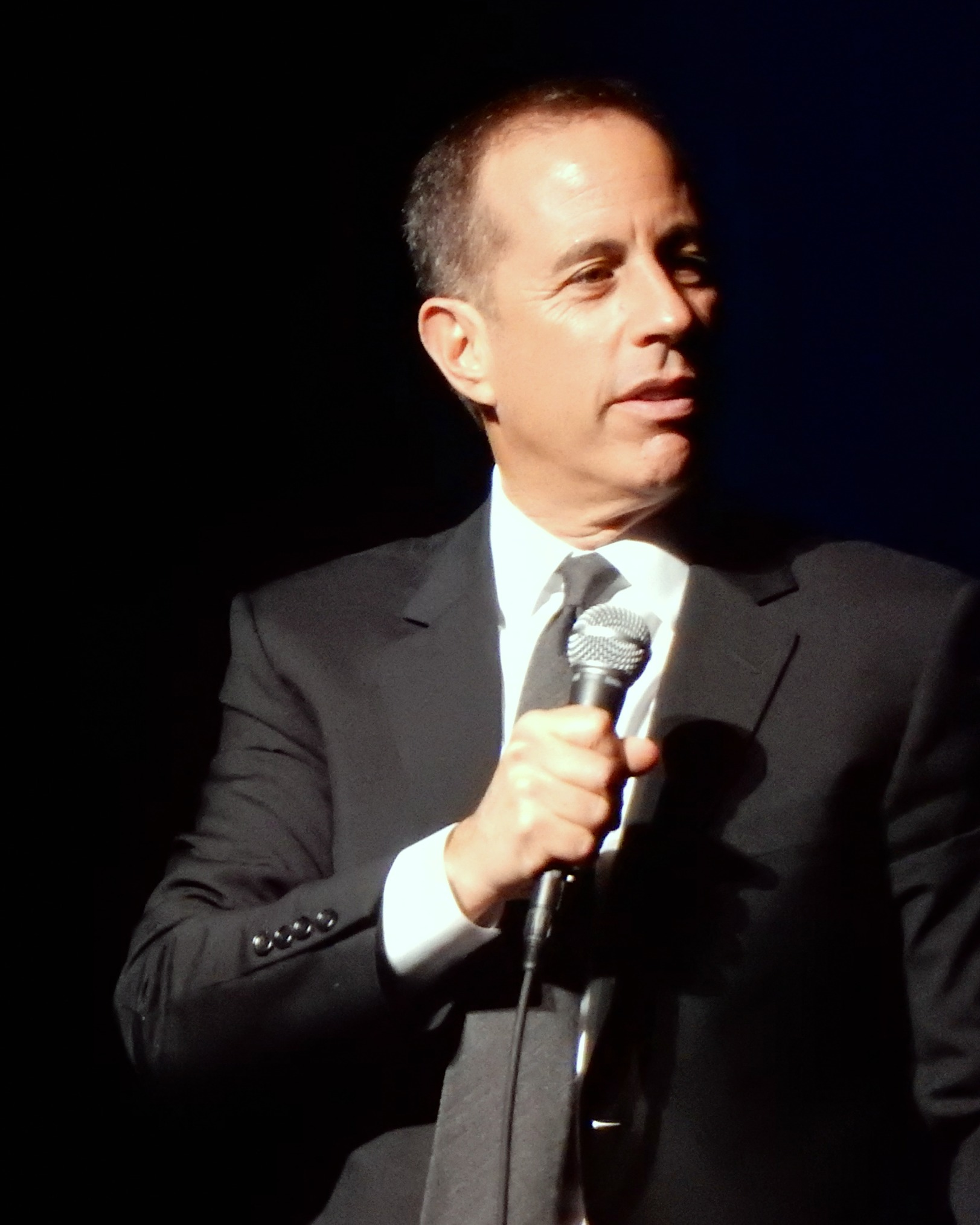
Jerry Seinfeld

- Pamela Adlon (born 1966), actress, voice actress, producer, and director
- Carlos Alazraqui (born 1962), actor and comedian
- Woody Allen (born 1935), comedian, screenwriter, director, actor, author, playwright, and musician
- Desmond Amofah (1990–2019), YouTuber better known as Etika
- Alec Baldwin (born 1958), actor, comedian, and producer
- Lucille Ball (1911–1989), comedian, actress
- Mike Bocchetti (born 1961), stand-up comedian and radio personality
- Zach Braff (born 1975), actor, comedian, director, screenwriter, and producer
- Alyson Cambridge (born 1980), operatic soprano and classical music, jazz, and American popular song singer
- Michael Carbonaro (born 1982), actor and magician
- Eddie Carmel, born Oded Ha-Carmeili (1936–1972), Israeli-born entertainer with gigantism and acromegaly, popularly known as "The Jewish Giant"
- George Carlin (1937–2008), comedian and actor
- Michael Cole (born 1968), WWE announcer
- Pete Davidson (born 1993), comedian and actor
- Philip DeFranco (born 1985), YouTuber and video blogger
- Danny DeVito (born 1944), comedian, actor, producer, and director
- John DiMaggio (born 1968), actor and comedian
- Jimmy Fallon (born 1974), comedian, actor, and television host
- Nika Futterman (born 1969), actress, voice actress, comedian, and singer
- Cecilia Hart (1948–2016), actress
- Curly Howard (1903–1952), comedian, vaudevillian actor, and member of The Three Stooges
- Moe Howard (1897–1975), actor, comedian, and member of the Three Stooges
- Kevin James (born 1965), comedian, actor, screenwriter, and producer
- James Earl Jones (1931–2024), actor
- Colin Jost (born 1982), comedian, actor and writer
- JWoww (real name Jennifer Farley) (born 1986), reality television personality
- Daniel Keem (born 1982), YouTuber better known as Keemstar
- Tom Kenny (born 1962), actor, comedian, voice of SpongeBob SquarePants
- Jimmy Kimmel (born 1967), comedian, producer, voice actor, musician, and television personality
- Jay Leno (born 1950), comedian, former host of The Tonight Show (1992–2014)
- Demetri Martin (born 1973), comedian
- Chico Marx (1887–1961), vaudeville comedian with the Marx Brothers
- Groucho Marx (1890–1977), vaudeville comedian with the Marx Brothers
- Gummo Marx (1892–1977), vaudeville comedian with the Marx Brothers
- Harpo Marx (1888–1964), vaudeville comedian with the Marx Brothers
- Zeppo Marx (1901–1979), vaudeville comedian with the Marx Brothers
- Jackie Mason (1928–2021), comedian and actor
- Kate McKinnon (born 1984), comedian, actress, and voice actress
- Eddie Murphy (born 1961), comedian, actor, writer, singer, producer, and voice actor
- Rosie O'Donnell (born 1962), comedian, actress, and television personality
- Jordan Peele (born 1979), comedian, actor, film director, and screenwriter
- Melissa Rauch (born 1980), comedian and actress
- Kevin Michael Richardson (born 1964), actor and voice actor
- Adam Richman (born 1974), television personality
- Don Rickles (1926–2017), comedian
- Joan Rivers (1933–2014), actress and comedian
- Chris Rock (born 1965), comedian and actor
- Adam Sandler (born 1966), comedian, actor, screenwriter, film producer, and musician
- Adam Savage (born 1967), co-host of MythBusters
- Amy Schumer (born 1981), stand-up comedian and actress
- Jerry Seinfeld (born 1954), comedian and actor
- Judy Sheindlin (born 1942), lawyer and television personality (Judge Judy)
- Rowena Granice Steele (1824–1901), performer, writer
- Martha Stewart (born 1941), businesswoman, writer, chef, and television personality
- Jon Stewart (born 1962), comedian, actor, writer, producer, director, media critic, and television personality; former host of The Daily Show (1999–2015)
- Fred Tatasciore (born 1967), voice actor
- John Valby (born 1944), comedian and musician

=== Singers and instrumentalists ===
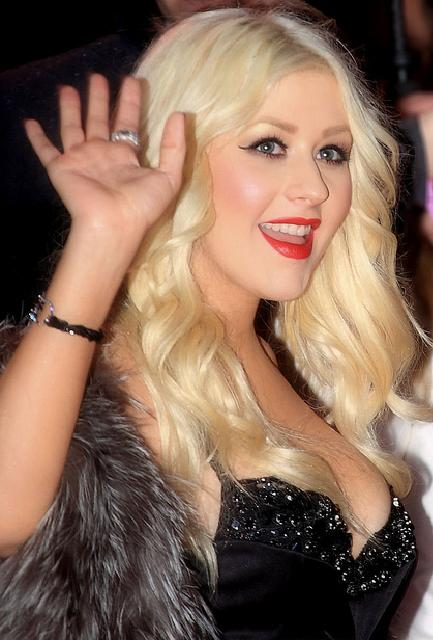
Christina Aguilera

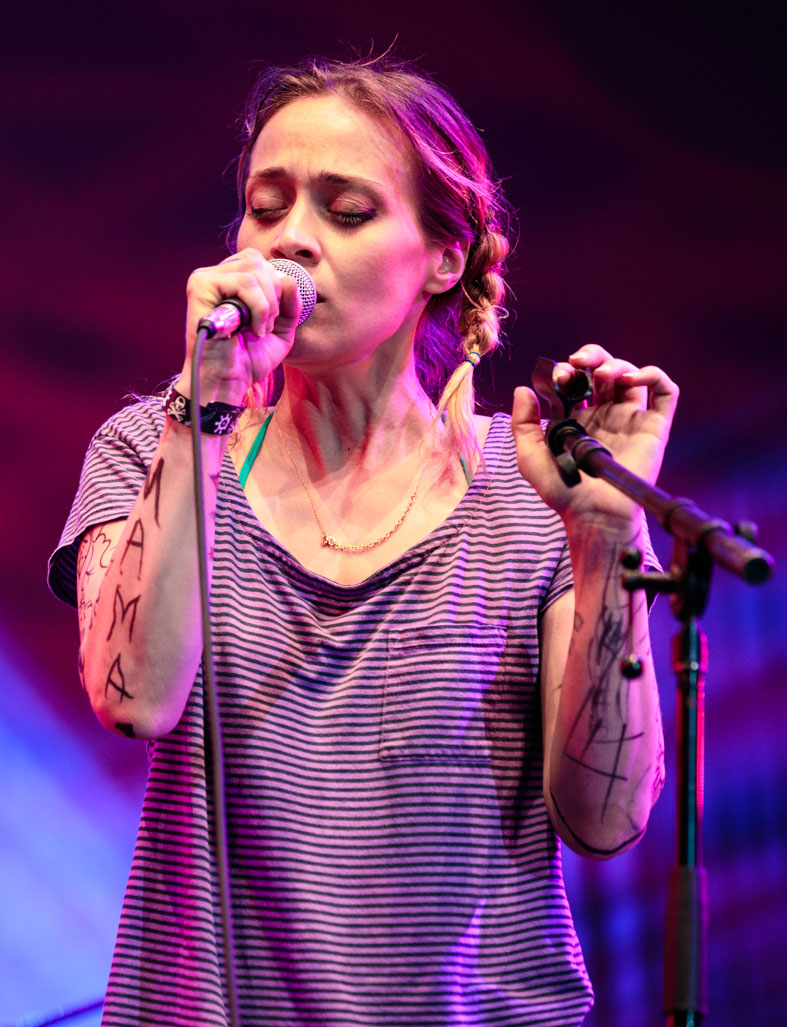
Fiona Apple

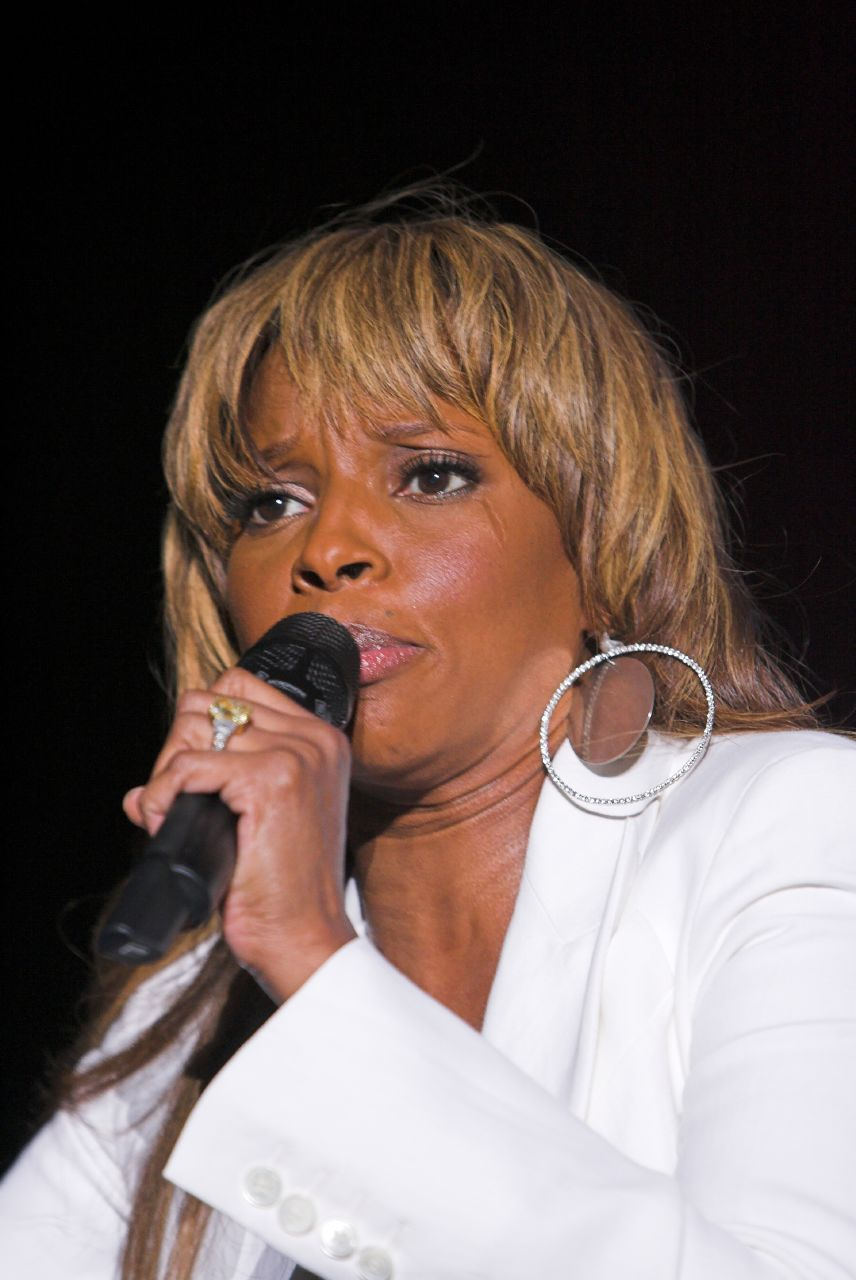
Mary J. Blige

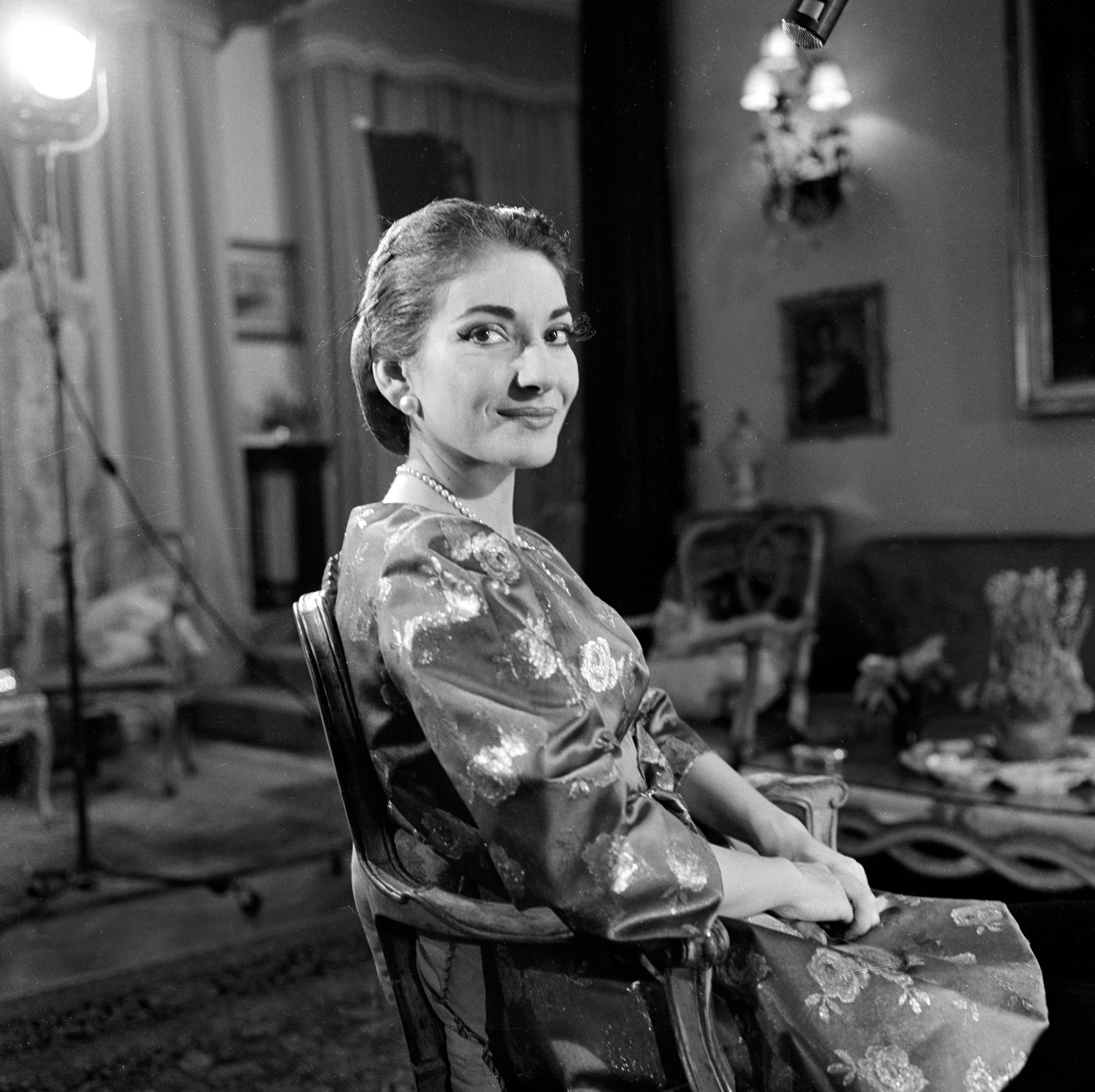
Maria Callas

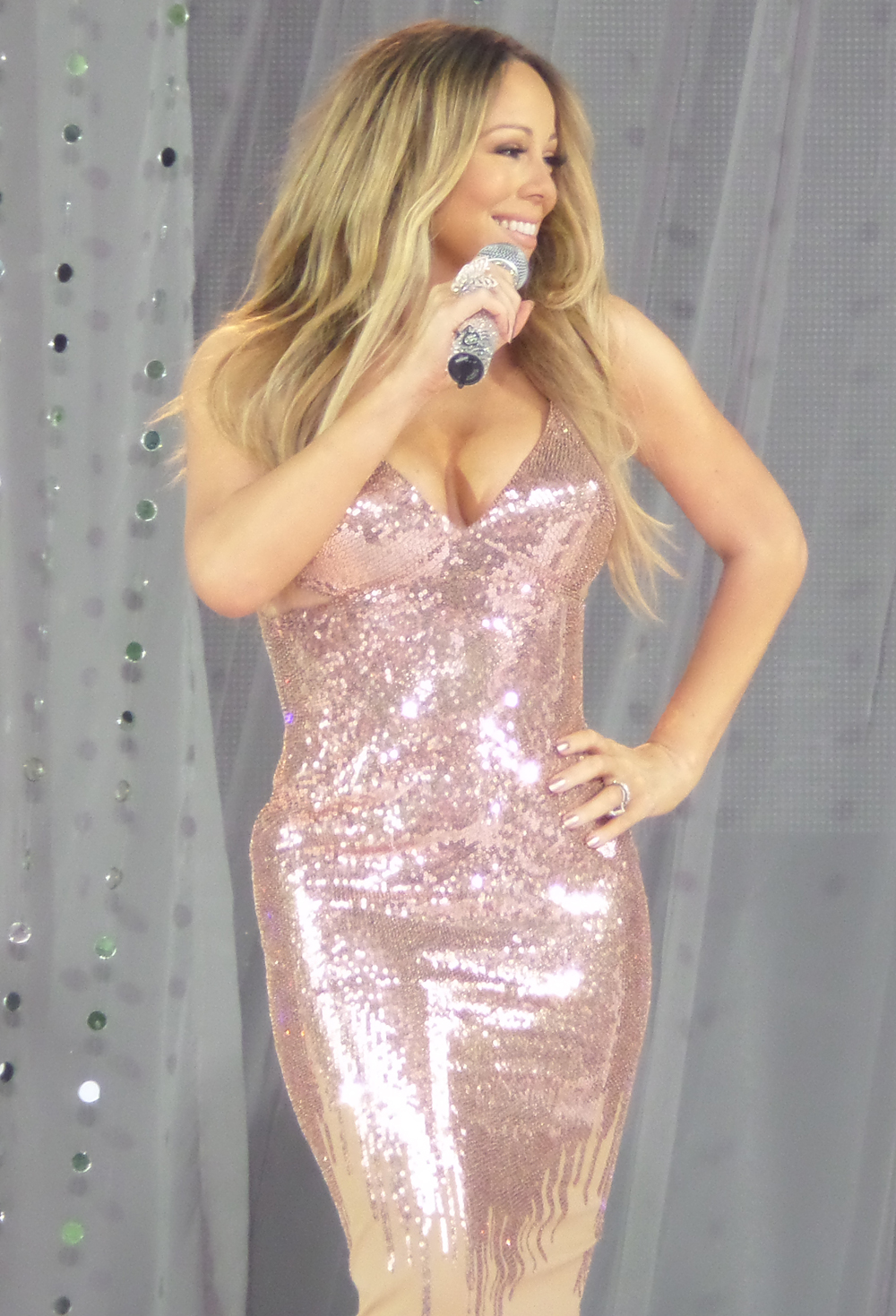
Mariah Carey

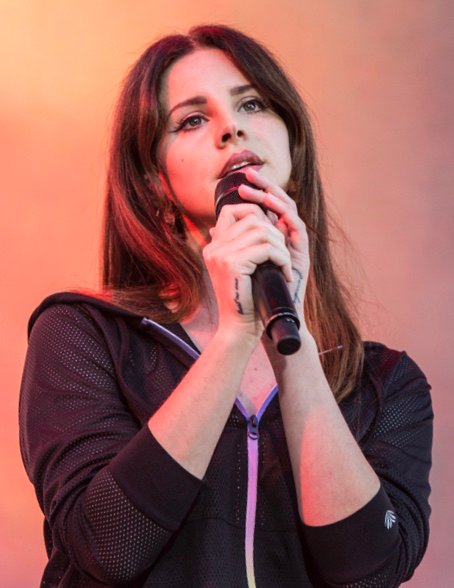
Lana Del Rey

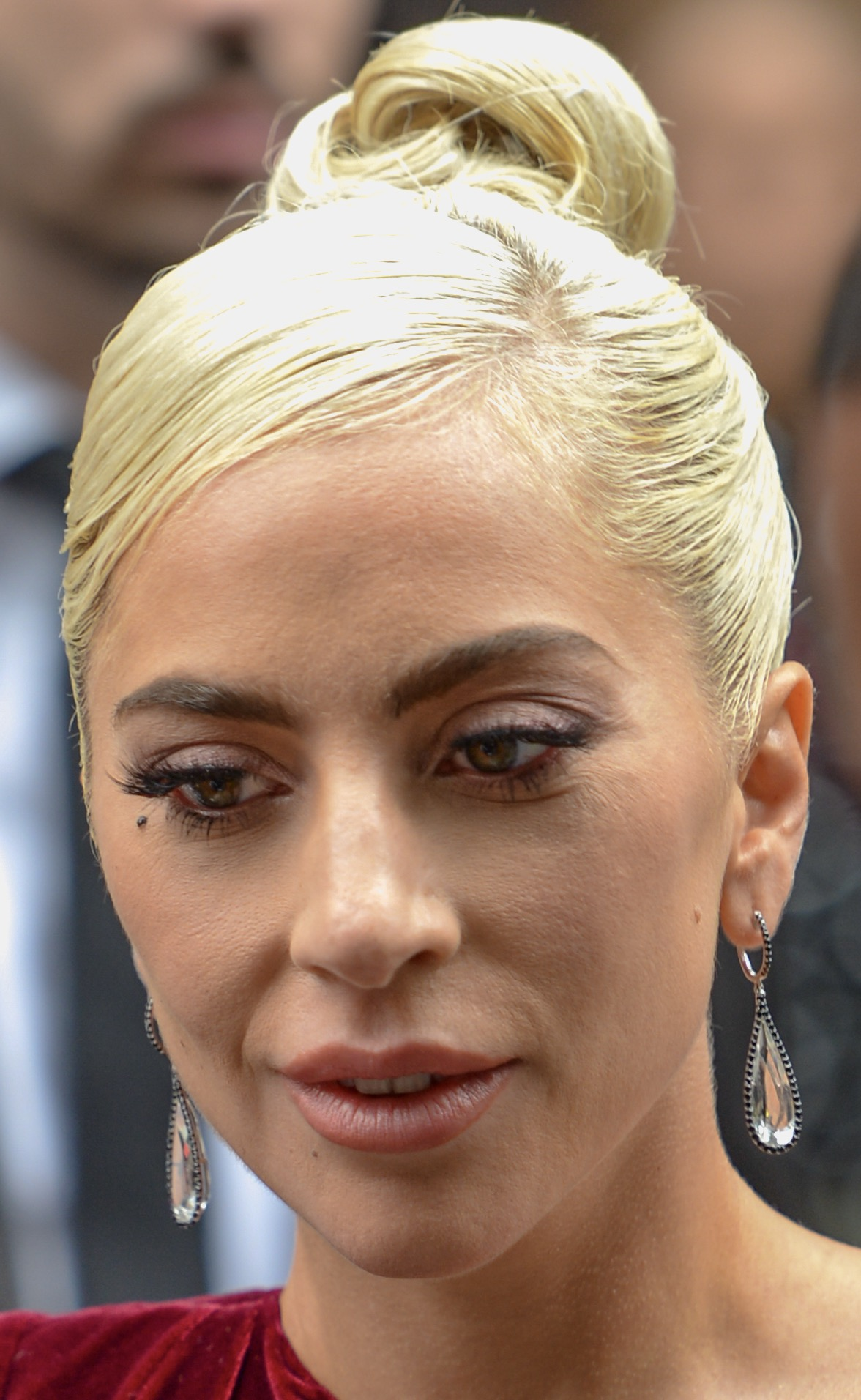
Lady Gaga

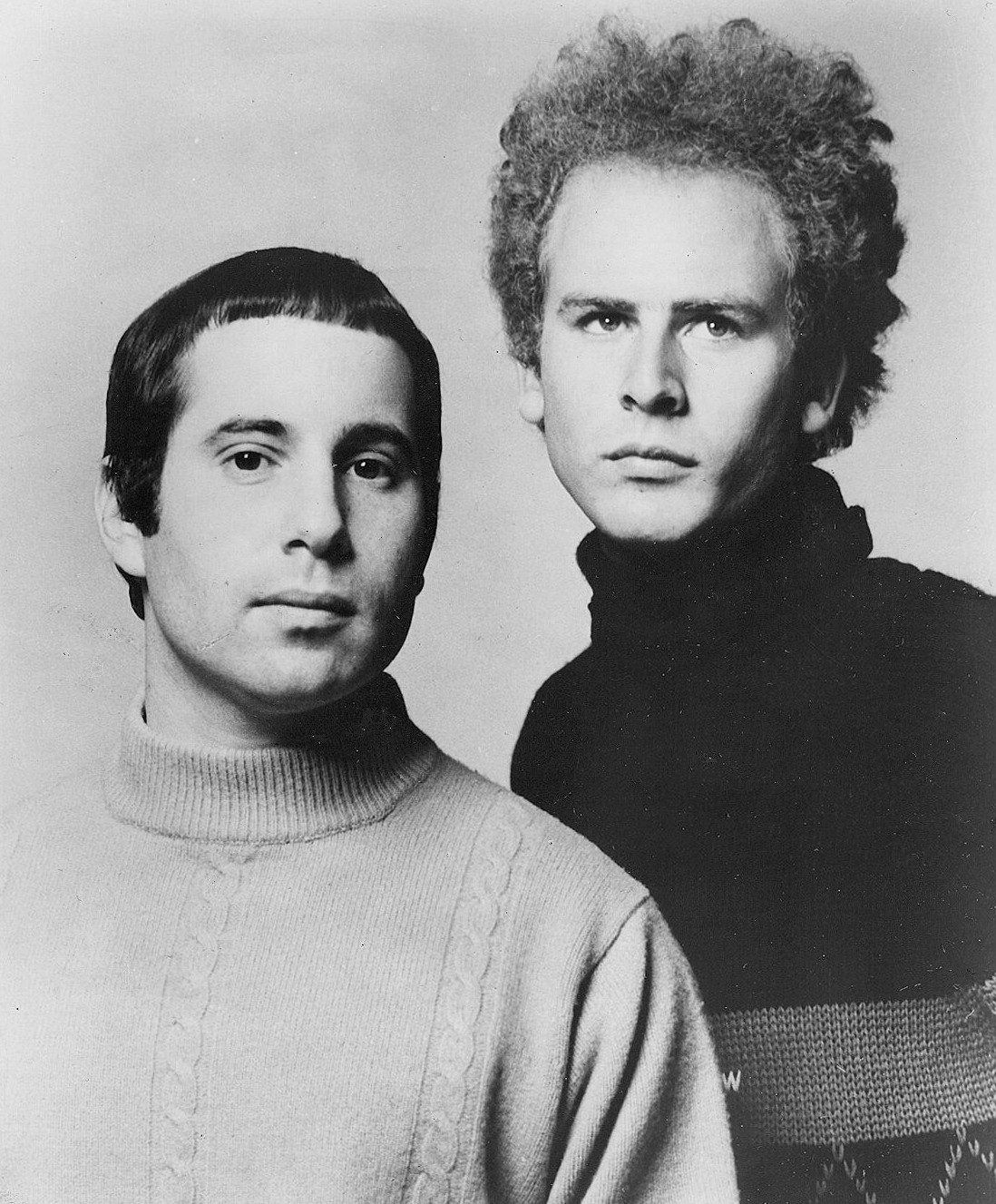
Art Garfunkel and Paul Simon

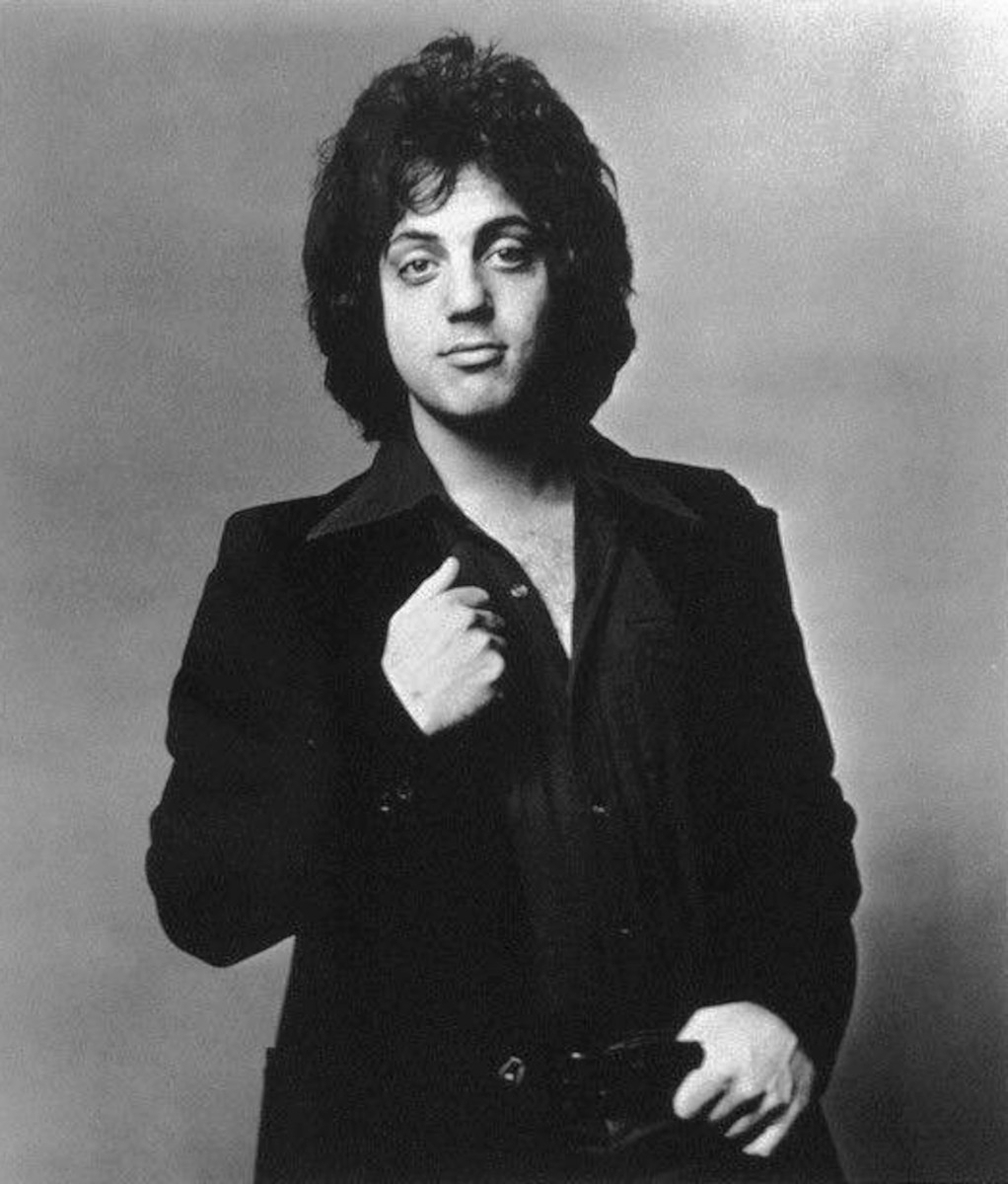
Billy Joel

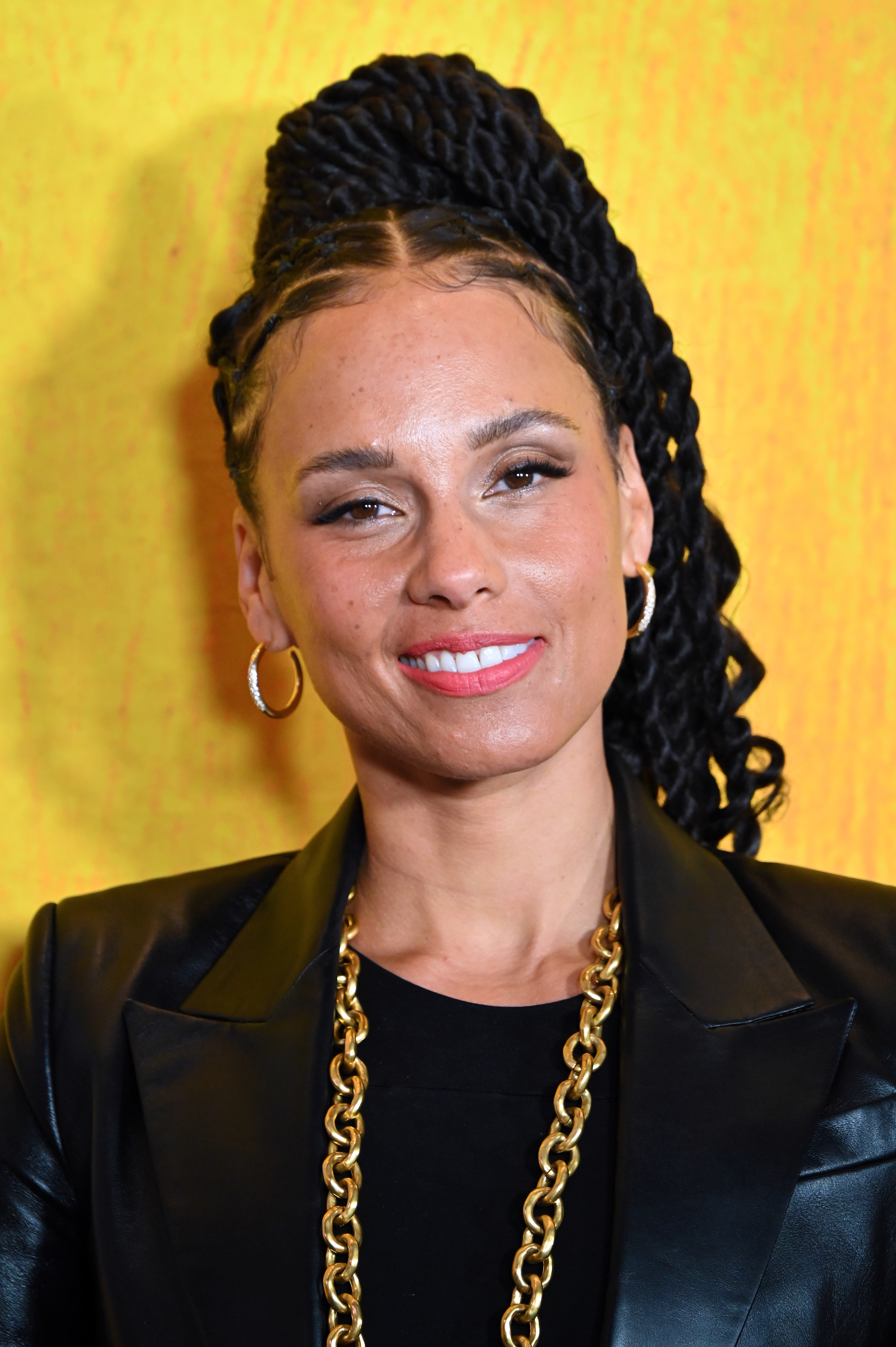
Alicia Keys

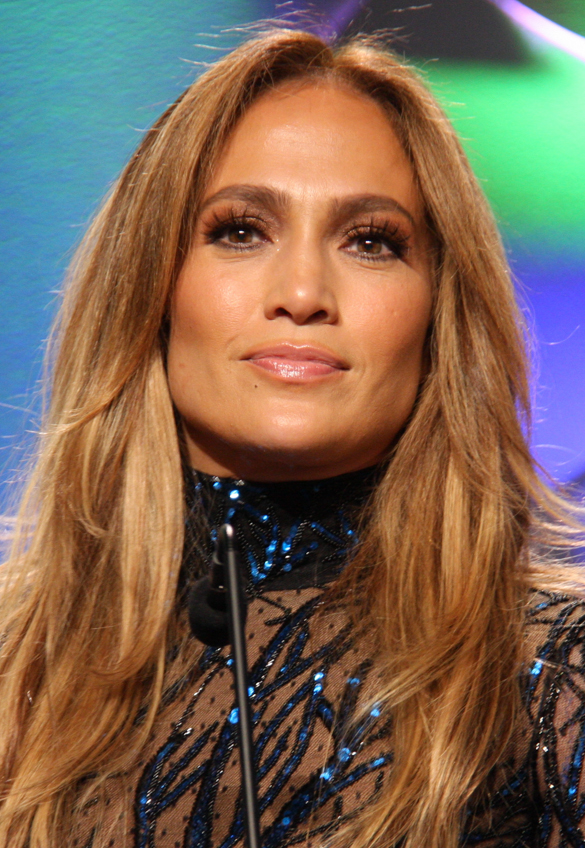
Jennifer Lopez

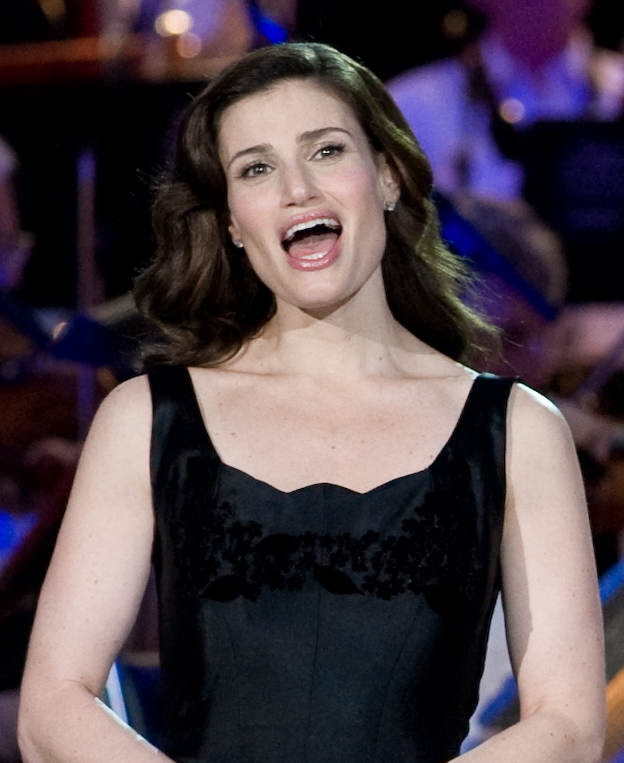
Idina Menzel

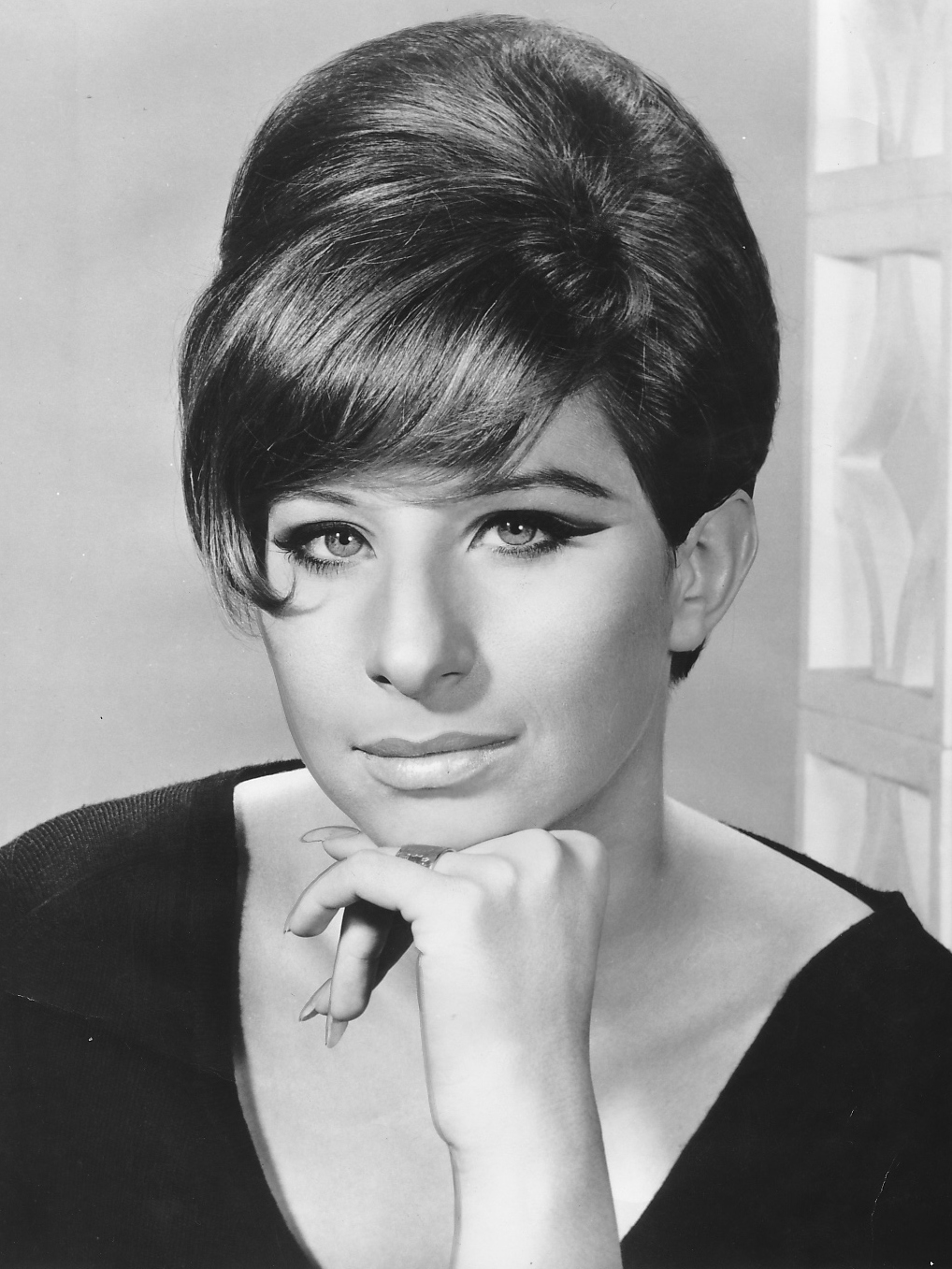
Barbra Streisand

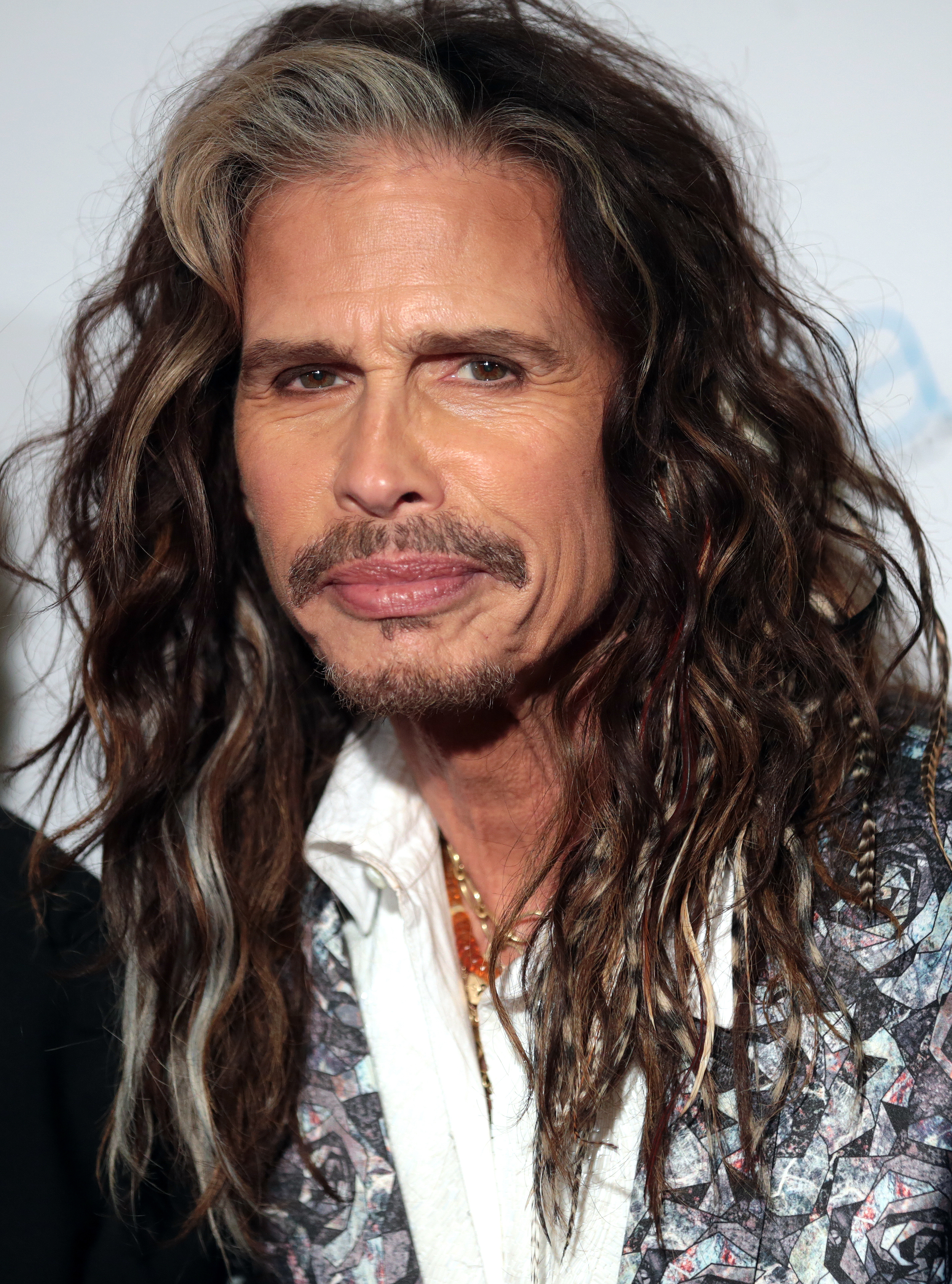
Steven Tyler

- Aaliyah (1979–2001), singer, actress, model, and dancer
- Christina Aguilera (born 1980), singer-songwriter, and actress
- Vinnie Amico, drummer
- Fiona Apple (born 1977), singer
- Arcángel, reggaeton singer
- Harold Arlen (1905–1986), composer
- Ashanti (born 1980), singer
- Adrienne Bailon (born 1983), singer
- David Baker, singer
- Chris Barnes (born 1967), musician
- Count Basie (1904–1984), jazz musician
- Bryan Bautista (born 1992), Dominican-American pop singer and contestant on NBC's The Voice season 10
- Jay Beckenstein (born 1951), saxophonist
- Madison Beer (born 1999), singer
- Pat Benatar (born 1953), singer
- Tony Bennett (1926–2023), jazz singer
- Mary J. Blige (born 1971), singer-songwriter, and actress
- Jon Bon Jovi (born 1962), singer-songwriter, record producer, philanthropist, and actor (Bon Jovi)
- Laura Branigan (1952–2004), singer
- Keith Buckley (born 1979), musician
- Jimmy Buffett (1946-2023), singer-songwriter
- Clem Burke (born 1955), musician and drummer (Blondie)
- Maria Callas (1923–1977), opera singer
- Mariah Carey (born 1969), pop and R&B singer-songwriter
- Vanessa Carlton (born 1980), pop singer-songwriter
- Blue Ivy Carter (born 2012), singer
- Peter Case (born 1954), singer-songwriter
- Peter Cincotti (born 1983), singer-songwriter, and pianist
- Coko (born 1973), singer (SWV)
- John Coltrane (1926–1967), jazz musician
- Aaron Copland (1900–1990), composer
- Warren Cuccurullo (born 1956), rock guitarist
- Vic Dana (born 1942), singer
- Dawin (full name Dawin Polanco; born 1990), hip hop-R&B singer-songwriter and record producer
- Blossom Dearie (1924–2009), jazz singer and pianist
- Lana Del Rey (born 1985), singer-songwriter
- Rob Derhak (born 1968), bass guitarist
- Lance Diamond (1945–2015), singer
- Neil Diamond (born 1941), singer-songwriter
- Ani DiFranco (born 1970), singer-songwriter
- Jonathan Donahue (born 1966), rock musician
- JoAnn Falletta (born 1954), classical guitarist and orchestral conductor
- Morton Feldman (1926–1987), composer
- Ella Fitzgerald (1918–1996), singer
- John Flansburgh (born 1960), singer-songwriter
- Brendan Fletcher (born 1990), pop singer-songwriter and contestant on NBC's The Voice season 11
- Lukas Foss (1922–2009), composer and orchestral conductor
- Sawyer Fredericks (born 1999), contemporary folk singer-songwriter, and winner of NBC's The Voice season 8
- Dave Fridmann, producer
- Lady Gaga (real name Stefani Germanotta) (born 1986), singer-songwriter
- Art Garfunkel (born 1941), folk rock singer, poet, and actor (Simon & Garfunkel)
- Chuck Garvey, guitarist
- George Gershwin (1898–1937), composer
- Kim Gordon (born 1953), bass guitarist, guitarist, singer-songwriter, and visual artist (Sonic Youth)
- Lesley Gore (1946–2015), singer-songwriter, actress, and activist
- Andy Grammer (born 1983), singer-songwriter and record producer
- Grasshopper (born Sean Mackowiak; born 1967), rock musician
- Jim Hall (1930–2013), jazz guitarist
- Debbie Harry (born 1945), singer-songwriter, actress, and lead singer of Blondie
- Alan Heatherington (born 1945), orchestral conductor
- Ray Henderson (1897–1970), songwriter
- Lauryn Hill (born 1975), singer-songwriter, rapper, record producer, and actress
- Joel Hirschhorn (1938–2005), songwriter
- Billie Holiday (1915–1959), jazz and blues singer
- Bob Holz (born 1958), drummer and composer
- Lena Horne (1917–2010), singer and actress
- Whitney Houston (1963–2012), singer, actress, producer, and model
- Freddie Jackson (born 1956), singer
- Rick James (1948–2004), singer
- Billy Joel (born 1949), pianist, singer-songwriter
- Joe Jonas (born 1989), singer-songwriter, actor, former member of the Jonas Brothers, brother of Nick, and current lead singer of DNCE
- Nick Jonas (born 1992), singer-songwriter, producer, actor, brother of Joe, and former member of the Jonas Brothers
- Jerome Kern (1885–1945), composer
- Alicia Keys (born 1981), singer-songwriter
- Carole King (born 1942), singer-songwriter
- Linda Király (born 1983), American-born Hungarian pop singer-songwriter and sister of Viktor
- Viktor Király (born 1984), American-born Hungarian pop singer and contestant on NBC's The Voice season 9
- Cyndi Lauper (born 1953), singer
- Jacquie Lee (born 1997), pop singer and contestant on NBC's The Voice season 5
- Mel Lewis (1929–1990), drummer
- John Linnell (born 1959), singer-songwriter
- Joe Locke (born 1959), jazz artist
- John Lombardo (born 1952), musician and songwriter
- Jennifer Lopez (born 1969), singer, actress, and dancer
- David Lucas (born 1937), composer
- Gary Mallaber (born 1946), drummer
- Barry Manilow (born 1943), singer-songwriter and musician
- Constantine Maroulis (born 1975), singer
- Melanie Martinez (born 1995), singer-songwriter, and music/video director
- Brian McKnight (born 1969), R&B singer
- Don McLean (born 1945), singer
- Don Menza (born 1936), saxophonist
- Idina Menzel (born 1971), singer-songwriter, actress, and voice of Elsa in Frozen
- Natalie Merchant (born 1963), singer-songwriter
- Stephanie Mills (born 1957), singer
- Janelle Monáe (born 1985), musician, model, and actress
- Gurf Morlix, musician
- Hani Naser (1950–2020), Jordanian-American musician
- Josh Newton (born 1973), bassist
- Willie Nile (born 1948), singer-songwriter
- Laura Nyro (1947–1997), singer-songwriter
- Colby O'Donis (born 1989), pop-R&B singer-songwriter, guitarist, producer, and actor
- Olivia (born 1981), R&B singer known for contributing vocals to the 50 Cent song "Candy Shop"
- Jack Owen (born 1967), guitarist (Cannibal Corpse)
- Tina Parol (born 1988), singer-songwriter
- J.N. Pattison (1839–1905), pianist and composer
- Caroline Pennell (born 1996), singer-songwriter and contestant on NBC's The Voice season 5
- Alisan Porter (born 1981), retired actress, singer-songwriter, and winner of NBC's The Voice season 10
- Charlie Puth (born 1991), pop singer-songwriter and record producer
- Joey Ramone (1951–2001), punk rock singer-songwriter and musician (Ramones)
- Mary Ramsey (born 1963), musician
- Sharon Redd (1945–1992), singer
- Lou Reed (1942–2013), singer-songwriter, and guitarist
- Bebe Rexha (born 1989), singer-songwriter
- Sonny Rollins (1930-2026), jazz saxophonist
- Neil Rosenshein (born 1947), operatic singer and lyric tenor
- Rahzel (born 1964), beatboxer
- Kevin Rudolf (born 1983), pop/indie rock singer, musician, and record producer
- Jason Sebastian Russo (born 1973), rock musician
- Justin Russo (born 1976), rock musician
- John Rzeznik (born 1965), musician (Goo Goo Dolls)
- Romeo Santos, singer
- Adam Schlesinger (1967–2020), musician (Fountains of Wayne), songwriter, producer, and arranger
- Al Schnier (born 1968), guitarist
- John Serry Sr. (1915–2003), concert accordionist, organist, composer, arranger, and educator
- Billy Sheehan (born 1953), bass guitarist
- Kevin Shields (born 1963), musician, singer-songwriter and record producer (My Bloody Valentine)
- Paul Simon (born 1941), folk rock musician, guitarist, singer-songwriter, and actor (Simon & Garfunkel)
- Frank Sinatra (1915–1998), iconic jazz/pop singer, actor, and producer
- Justine Skye (born 1995), singer
- Lonnie Smith (1942–2021), jazz organist
- Dee Snider, singer-songwriter; front man of the heavy metal band Twisted Sister
- Ronnie Spector (1943–2022), singer (The Ronettes)
- John Stevens (born 1987), singer
- Stevie J (born Steve Jordan), musician
- Barbra Streisand (born 1942), singer, actress
- Stan Szelest (1943–1991), musician
- Robby Takac (born 1964), musician (Goo Goo Dolls)
- George Tutuska, musician (Goo Goo Dolls, Jackdaw)
- Steven Tyler (born 1948), Hard rock musician, singer-songwriter, multi-instrumentalist, former television music competition judge, and lead singer of the rock band Aerosmith
- Sal Valentinetti (born 1995), Italian-American jazz singer and contestant on America's Got Talent season 11
- Grace VanderWaal (born 2004), singer-songwriter, ukuleleist, and winner of America's Got Talent season 11
- Luther Vandross (1951–2005), singer
- Jeremy Wall, jazz musician
- Luke Walter Jr. (1947–1996), Belgian musician
- Grover Washington Jr. (1943–1999), saxophonist
- Gerard Way (born 1977), pop punk-alternative/punk/emo rock musician, singer-songwriter, comic book writer, actor, and former lead singer of My Chemical Romance
- Alex Webster (born 1969), bassist (Cannibal Corpse)
- Mary Weiss (1948–2024), singer (The Shangri-Las)
- Cory Wells (1941–2015), singer
- Patrick Wilson (born 1969), drummer
- Jack Yellen (1892–1991), lyricist, composer

=== Rappers ===
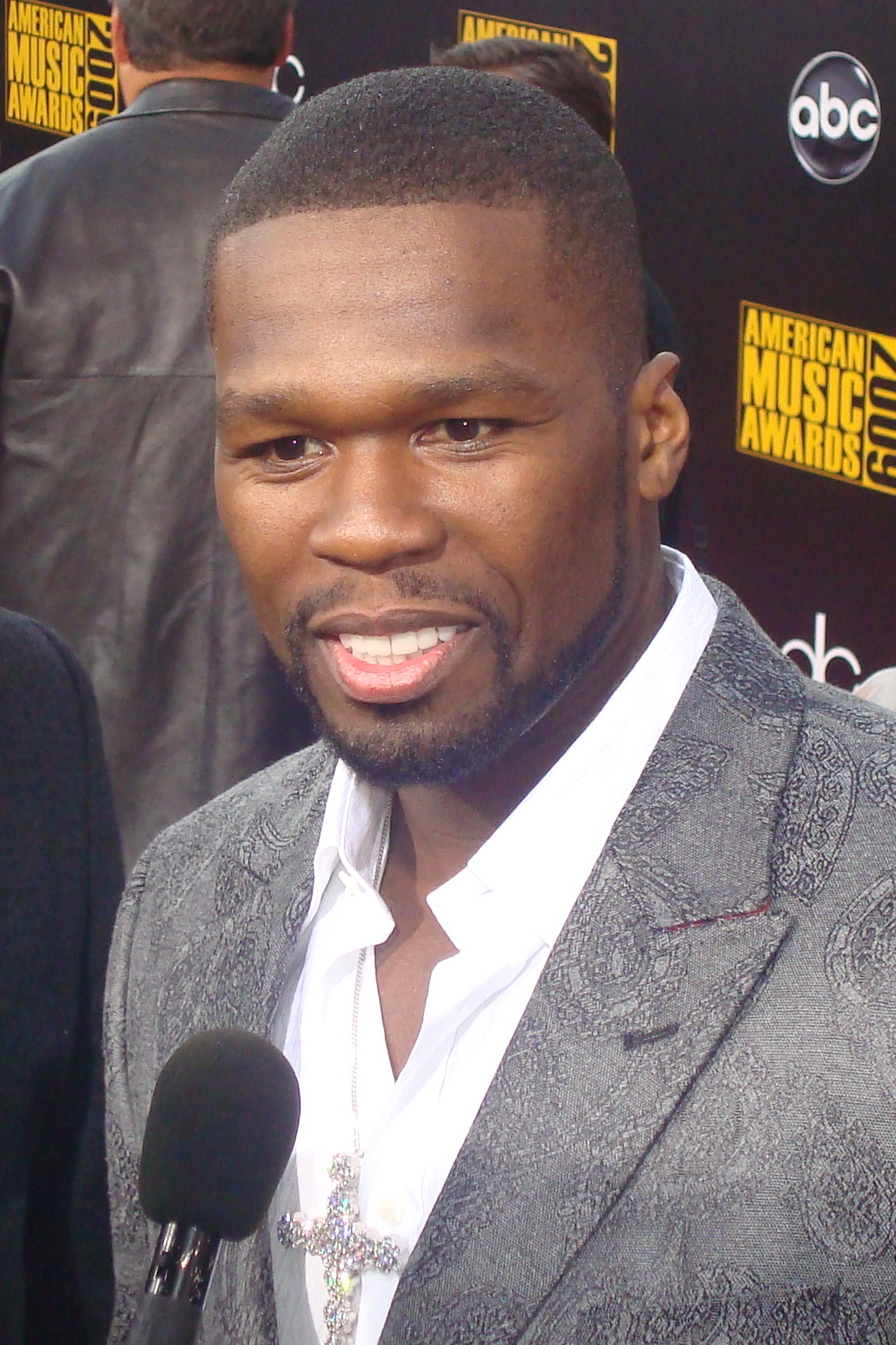
50 Cent

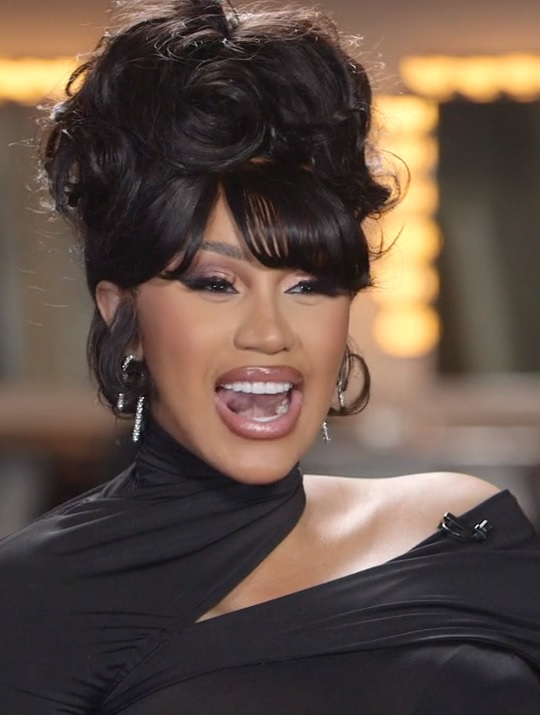
Cardi B

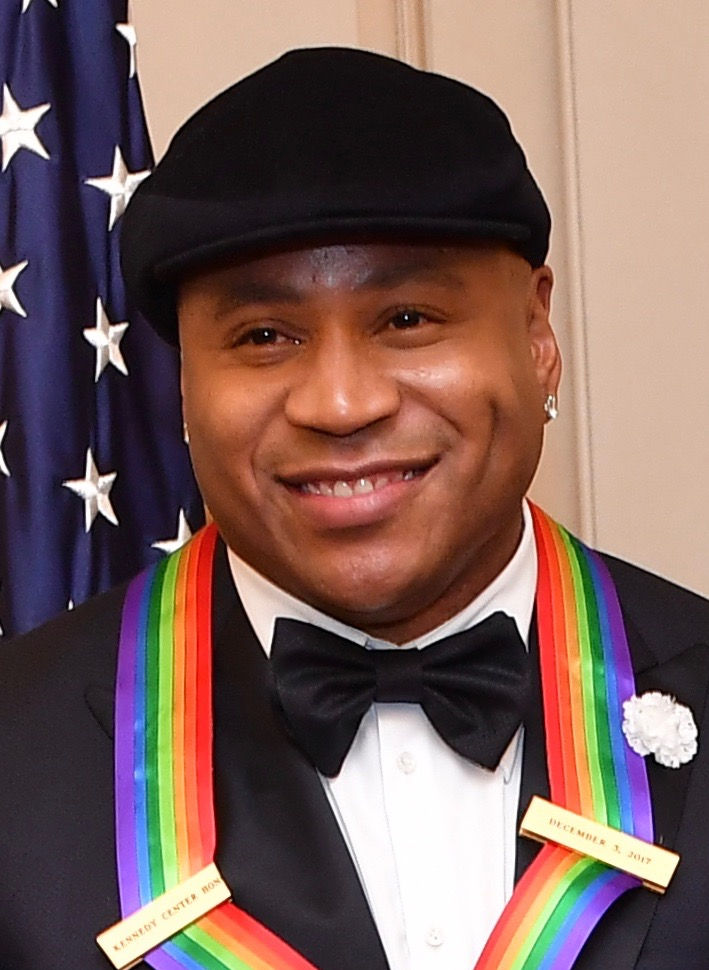
LL Cool J

- 2Pac (1971–1996), rapper, record producer, actor, and poet
- 50 Cent (born 1975), rapper, actor, businessman, and actor
- 6ix9ine (born 1996), rapper, songwriter
- Amil (born 1973), rapper and singer
- ASAP Rocky (born 1988), rapper, record producer, director, actor, and model
- Cardi B (born 1992), rapper
- Azealia Banks (born 1991), rapper
- Moses Michael Levi Barrow (born Jamal Michael Barrow; 1978), better known by his stage name Shyne, Belizean rapper and politician
- Beastie Boys (1979–2014), hip hop/hardcore punk band
- Big L (1974–1999), hip-hop recording artist
- Action Bronson (born 1983), rapper and television presenter
- Lola Brooke, rapper
- Foxy Brown (born 1978), rapper
- Busta Rhymes (born 1972), hip hop recording artist, actor, record producer, and record executive
- Cam'ron (born 1976), rapper, actor, and entrepreneur
- Sean Combs (born 1969), rapper, singer-songwriter, actor, record producer, and entrepreneur (also known as "P. Diddy", "Puff Daddy", or "Diddy")
- Desiigner (born 1997), rapper, singer-songwriter, record producer, record executive, and actor
- DMX (1970–2021), rapper, record producer, and actor
- DreamDoll (born 1992), rapper
- Dusty Locane (born 1999), rapper
- Fabolous (born 1977), rapper
- Fat Joe (born 1970), rapper
- Fivio Foreign (born 1990), rapper
- Freaky Tah (1971–1999), rapper
- Havoc (born 1974), rapper and record producer, member of Mobb Deep
- Ice Spice (born 2000), rapper
- Ja Rule (born 1976), rapper
- Jadakiss (born 1975), rapper
- Jay-Z (born 1969), rapper, businessman, investor, and actor
- Jim Jones (born 1976), hip-hop recording artist
- MC Jin, rapper and actor
- Joey Badass (born 1995), rapper
- KRS-One (born 1965), rapper and occasional producer
- Lil' Kim (born 1975), rapper, songwriter, record producer, model, and actress
- LL Cool J (born 1968), rapper, actor, and host of Spike TV's Lip Sync Battle
- Lil Mama (born 1989), rapper and singer
- Biz Markie (1964–2021), rapper, DJ, and record producer
- Matisyahu (born 1979), rapper, reggae vocalist, beatboxer, and alternative rock musician
- Travie McCoy (born 1981), rapper singer, co-founder and lead singer of Gym Class Heroes
- Darryl "DMC" McDaniels (born 1964), rapper, member of Run-DMC
- MF Doom (born 1971), rapper and record producer
- Mr. Cheeks (born 1971), rapper, member of Lost Boyz
- Mos Def (born 1973), hip hop recording artist, actor, and activist
- Post Malone (born 1995), rapper, singer, songwriter, and record producer
- Nicki Minaj (born 1982), rapper, singer, songwriter, and actress
- Nas (born 1973), hip hop recording artist, record producer, actor, and entrepreneur
- The Notorious B.I.G. (1972–1997), rapper and actor (also known as "Biggie Smalls" or "Biggie")
- Onyx
- Princess Nokia (born 1992), rapper
- Pop Smoke (1999–2020), rapper
- Prodigy (1974–2017), rapper, member of Mobb Deep
- Rakim (born 1968), rapper
- Remedy (born Ross Filler in 1972), rapper
- Remy Ma (born 1980), rapper
- Rich the Kid (born 1992), rapper
- Royal Flush (born 1975), rapper
- Russ (born 1992), rapper, singer-songwriter, and record producer
- Juelz Santana (born 1982), rapper and actor
- ScarLip (born 2000), rapper
- Bobby Shmurda (born 1994), rapper
- Diggy Simmons (born 1995), rapper
- Joseph "Run" Simmons (born 1964), rapper, member of Run-DMC
- A Tribe Called Quest
- Sheck Wes (born 1998), rapper
- Wu-Tang Clan
- Adam Yauch (1964–2012), rapper, singer-songwriter, musician, director, and film distributor
- Young M.A (born 1992), rapper

=== Bands ===
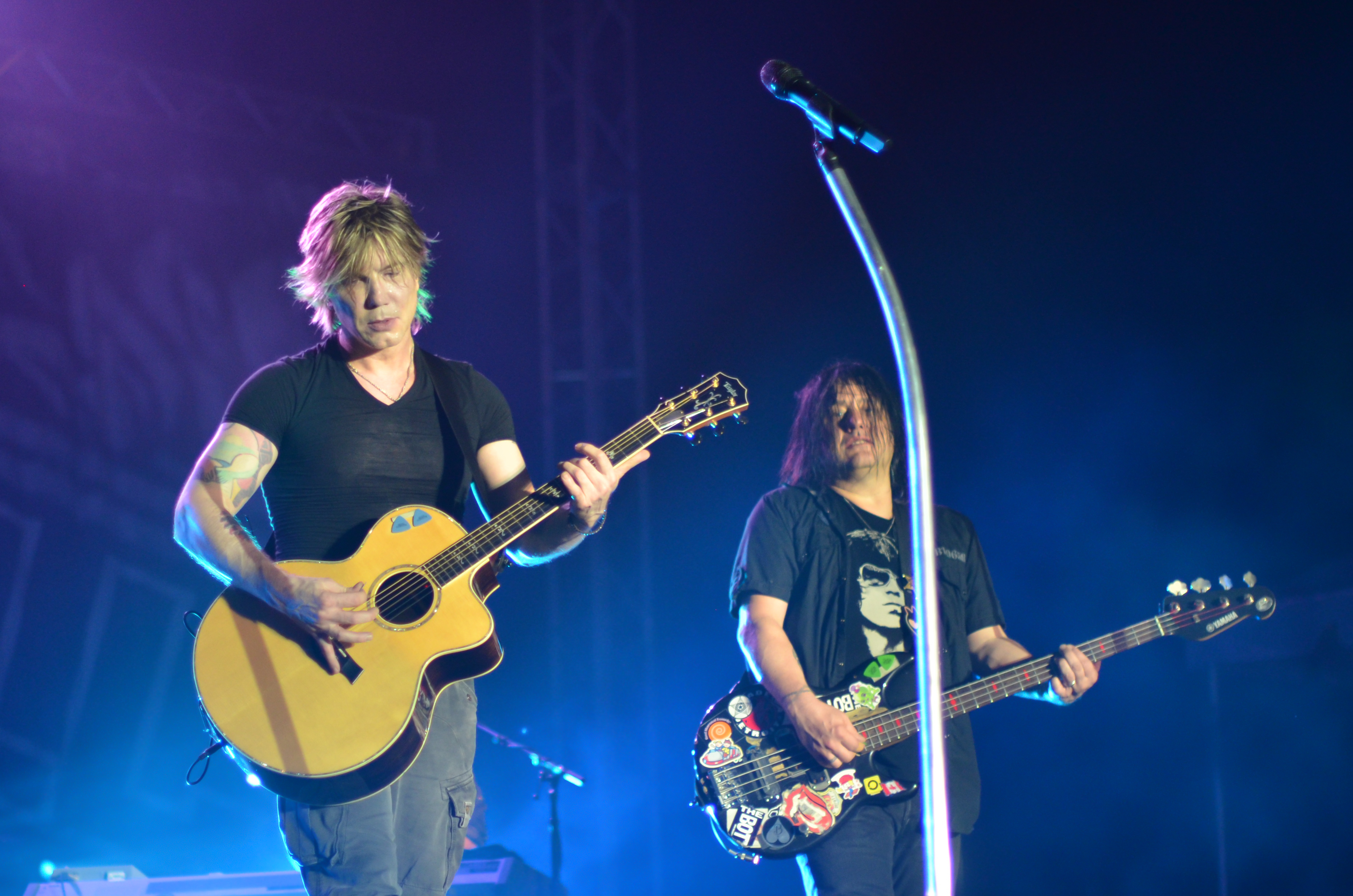
Goo Goo Dolls

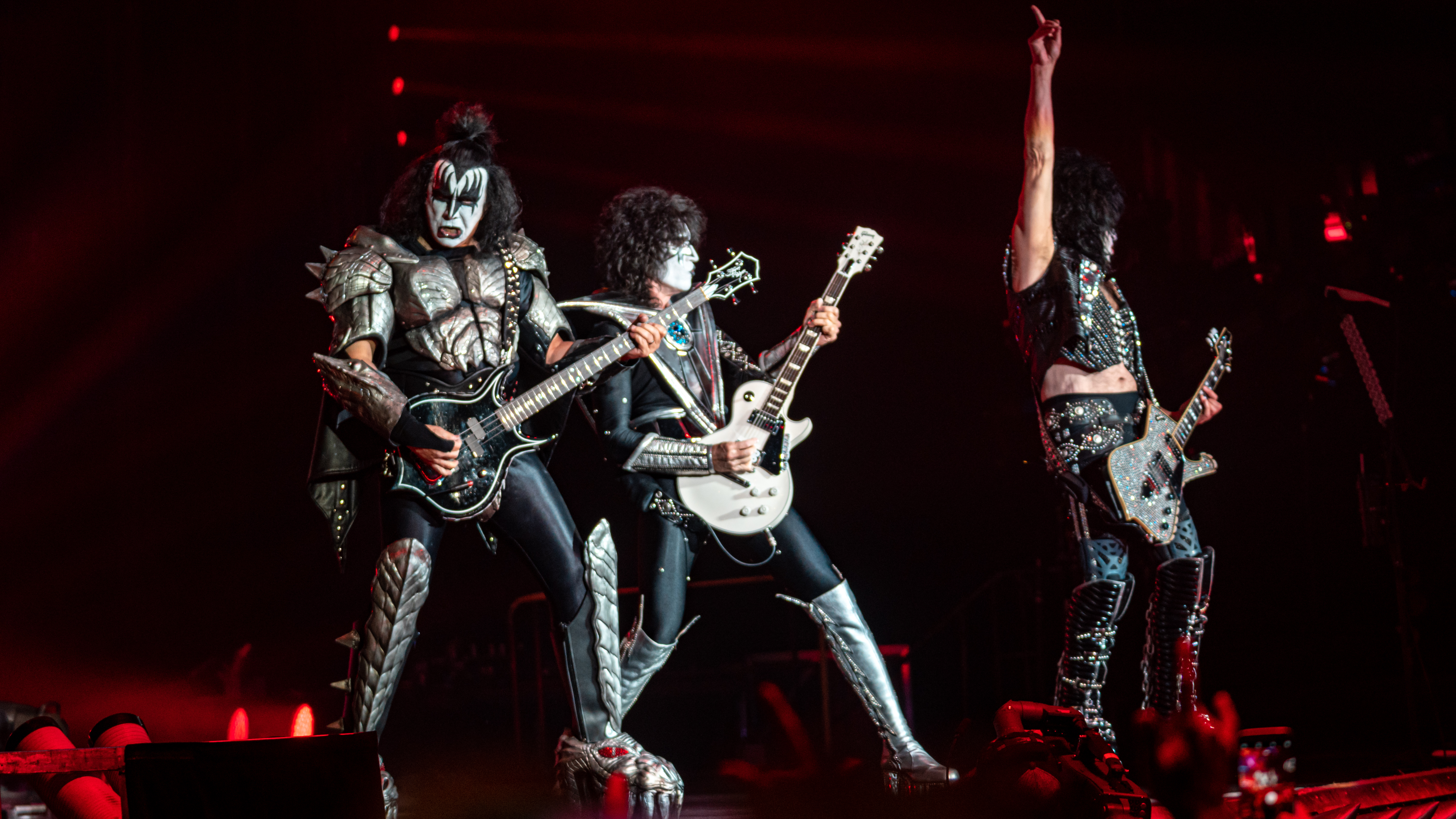
KIϟϟ

- AJR (2005–), indie pop band
- American Authors (2006–), pop rock band
- Aventura, bachata group
- Beastie Boys (1979–2014), hip hop/hardcore punk band
- Blondie (1974–), new wave-punk rock band
- Cobra Starship (2006–2015), dance-pop band
- Blue Öyster Cult (1967–), rock band
- Foreigner
- Goo Goo Dolls (1985–), alternative-pop rock band
- Gym Class Heroes (1997–2012, 2018–2019, 2023‒present), rap rock band
- KIϟϟ (1973–), hard rock band
- Naturally 7, a cappella band
- Ramones (1974–1996), punk rock band
- Steely Dan (1971–), jazz rock band
- Twisted Sister (1972–), heavy metal band
- Vampire Weekend
- X Ambassadors (2009–), alternative/pop rock band

=== Hip-hop groups ===
- 2 in a Room
- 3rd Bass
- Beastie Boys
- Black Moon
- Def Squad
- EPMD
- Eric B. & Rakim
- Flipmode Squad
- G-Unit
- Grandmaster Flash and the Furious Five
- Leaders of the New School
- Lord Tariq and Peter Gunz
- Mobb Deep
- Onyx
- Public Enemy
- Run-DMC
- Salt-N-Pepa
- Terror Squad
- A Tribe Called Quest
- Young Black Teenagers

== Art, literature, journalism, and philosophy ==
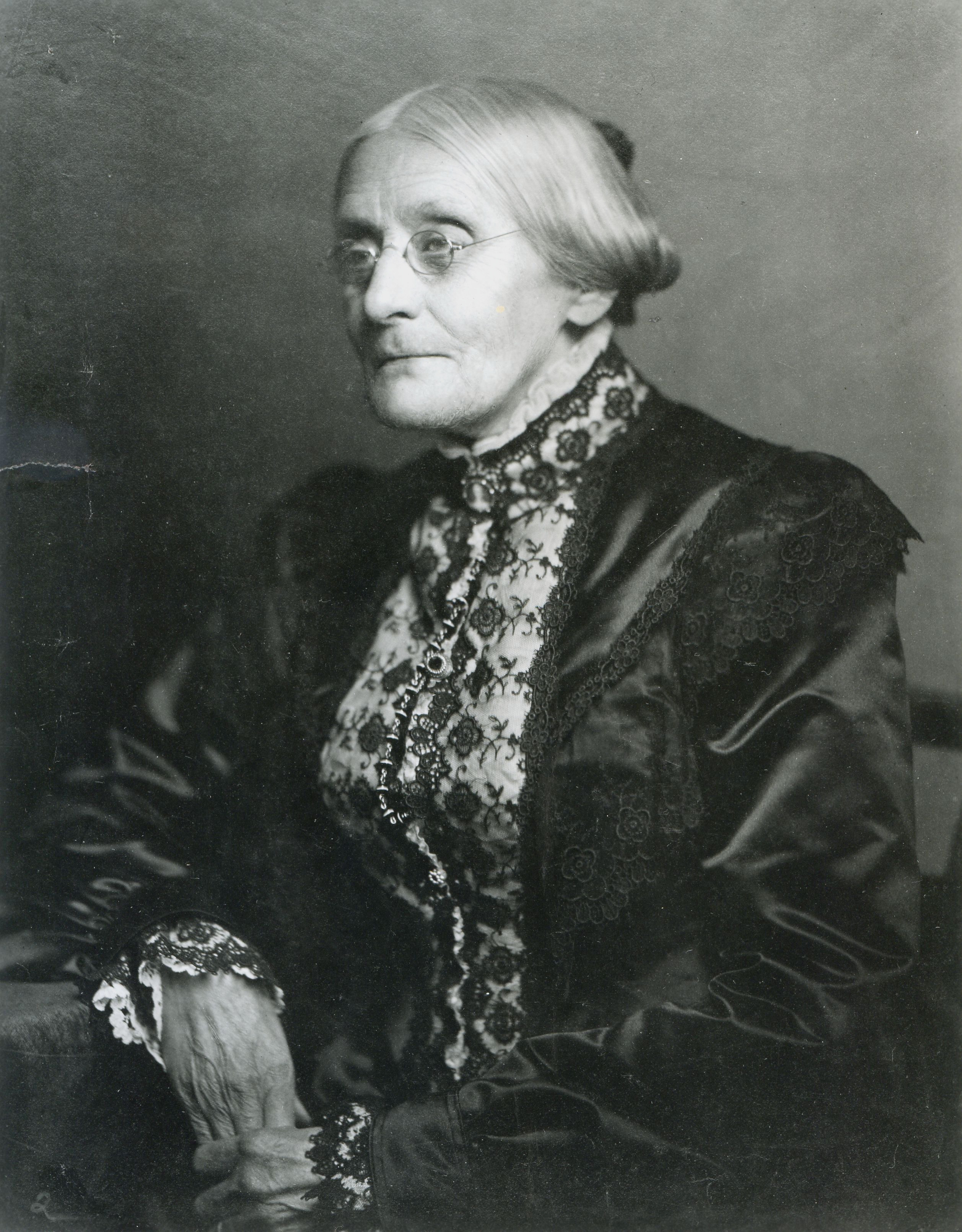
Susan B. Anthony

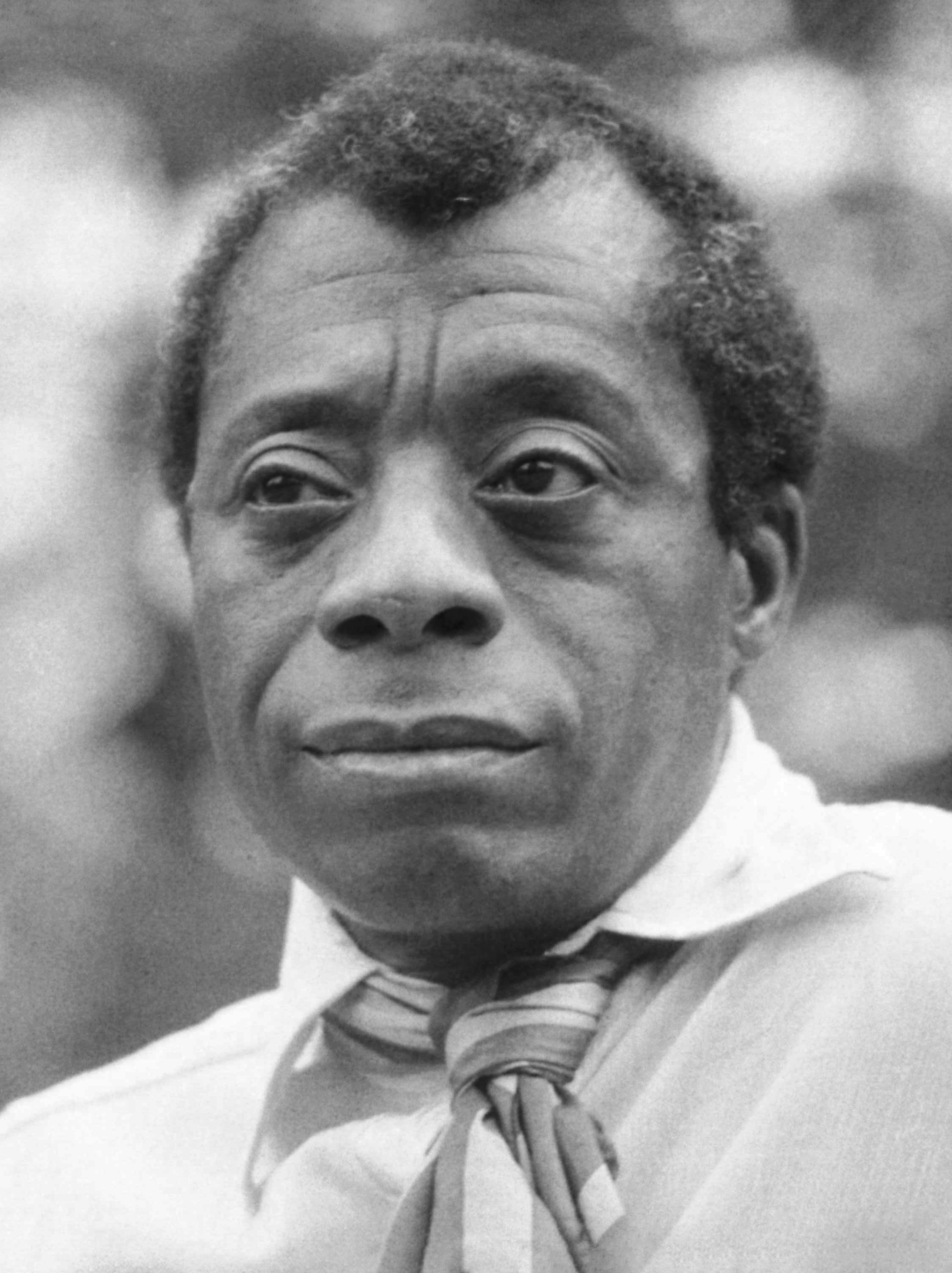
James Baldwin

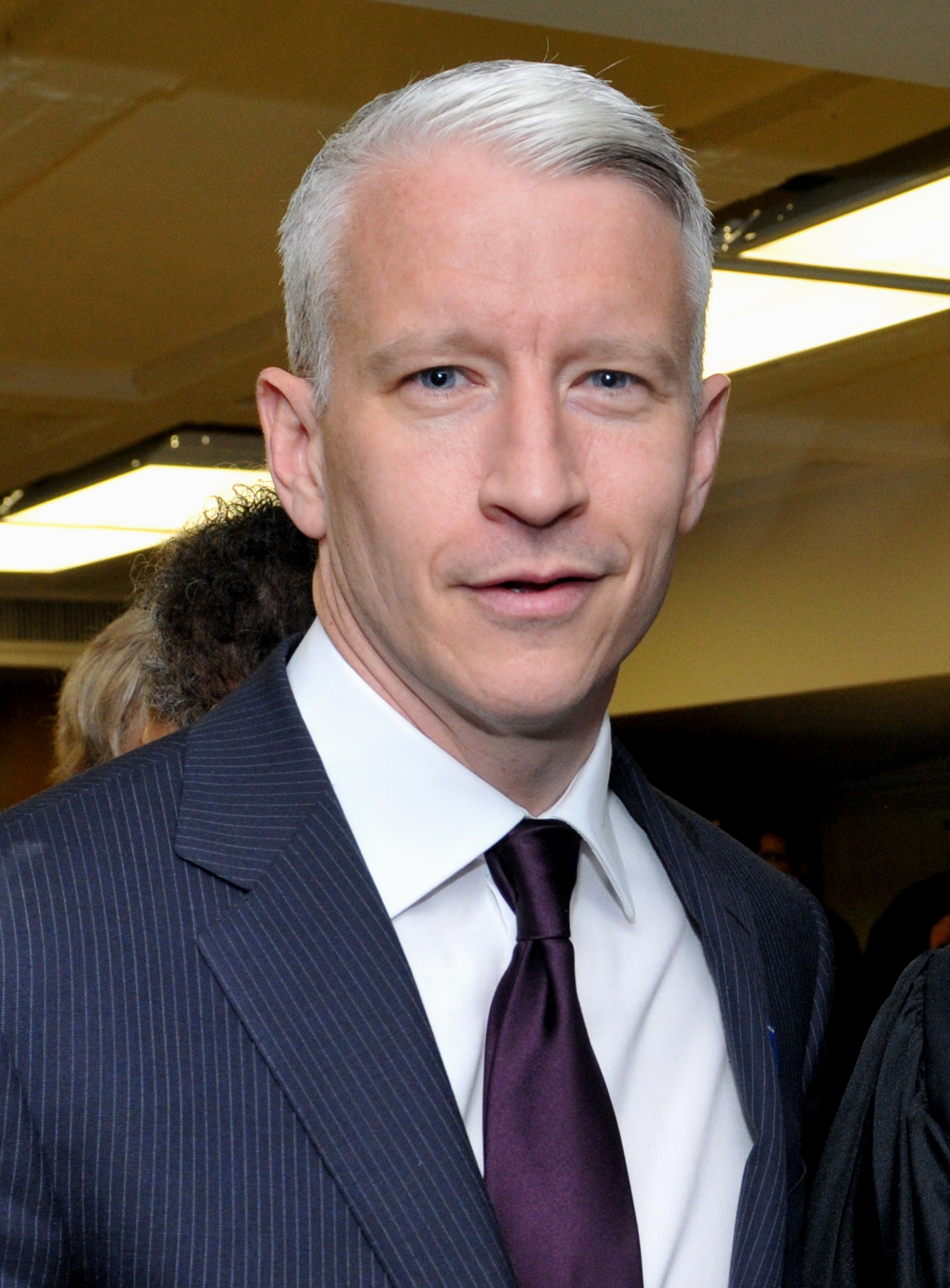
Anderson Cooper

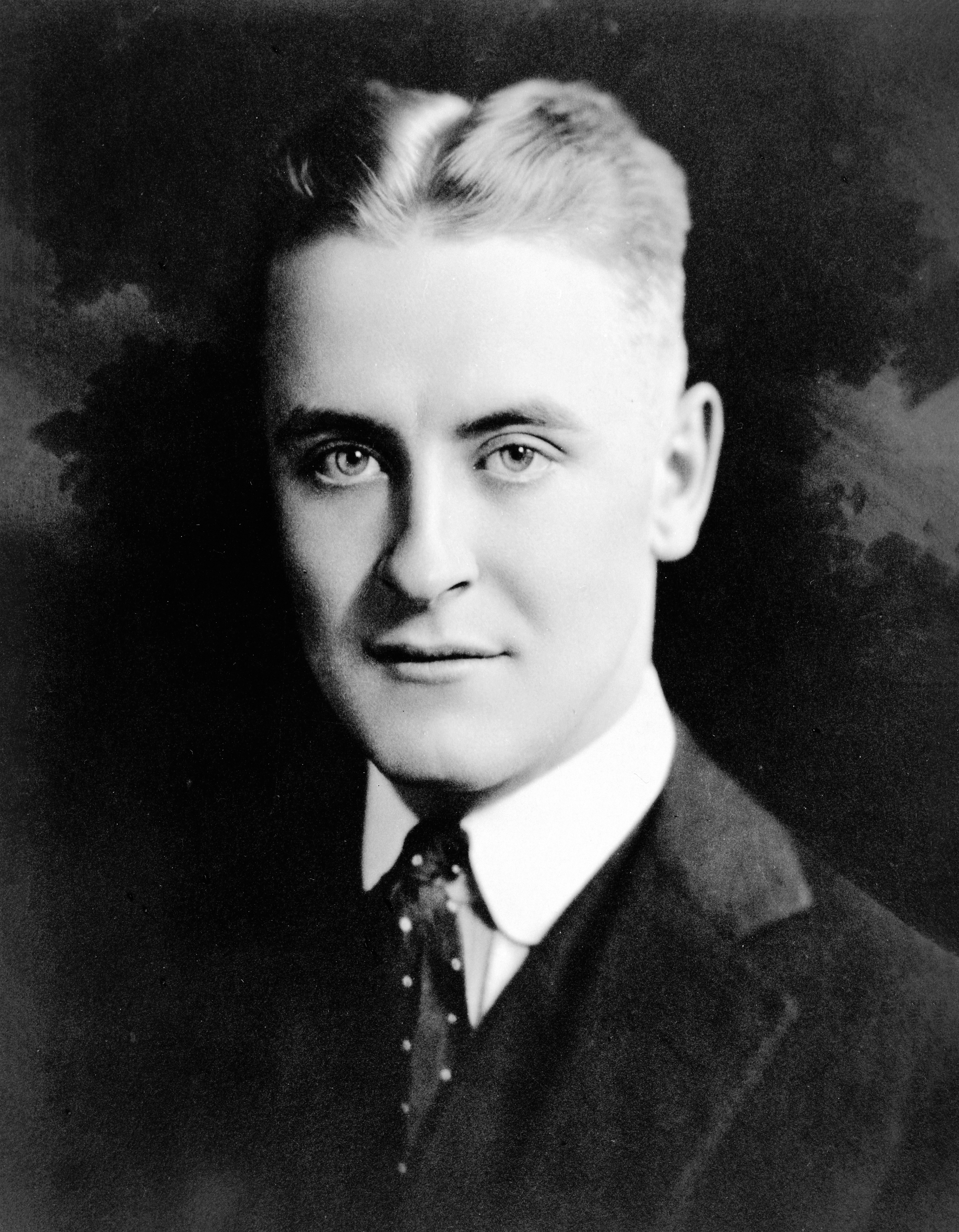
F. Scott Fitzgerald

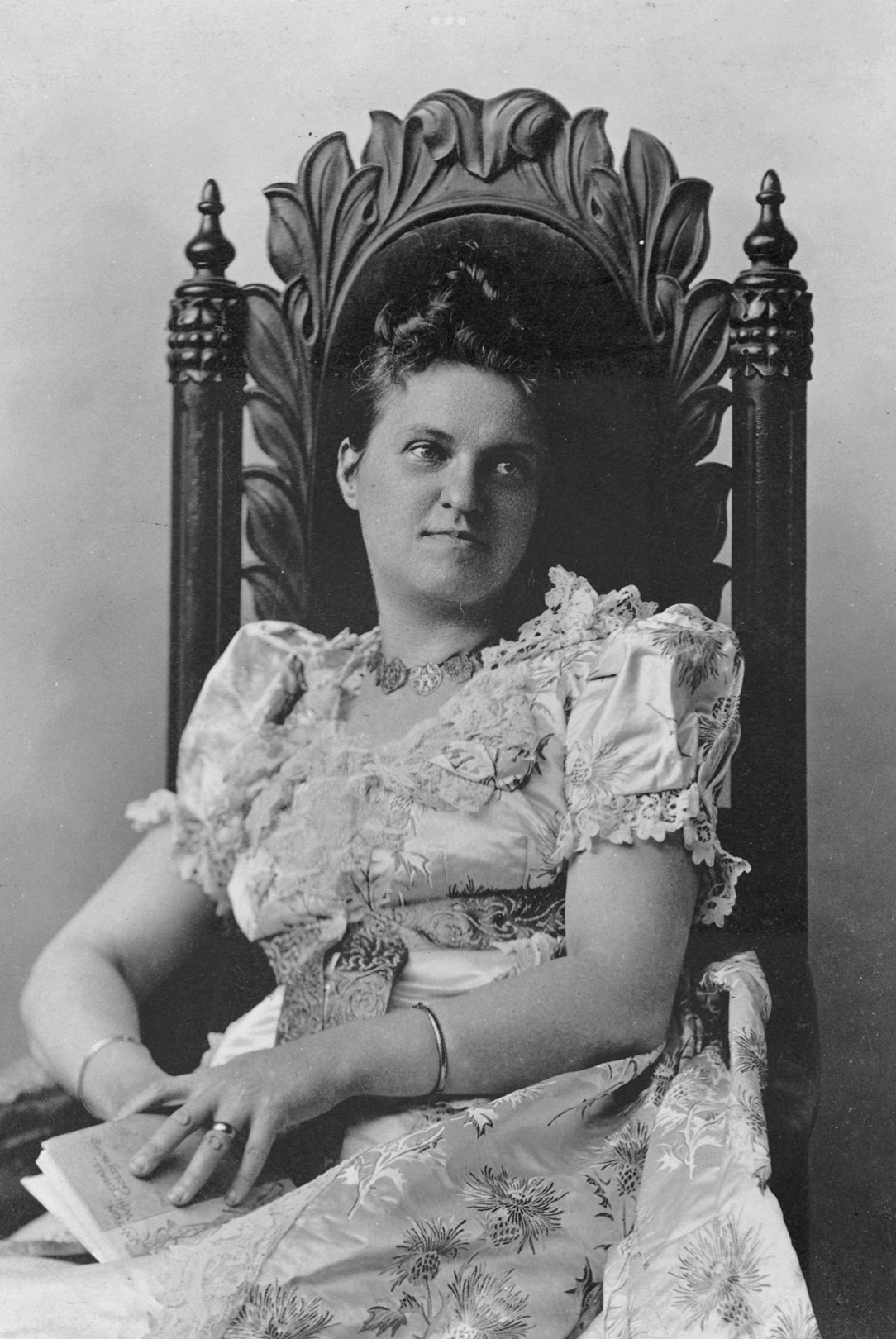
Anna Katharine Green

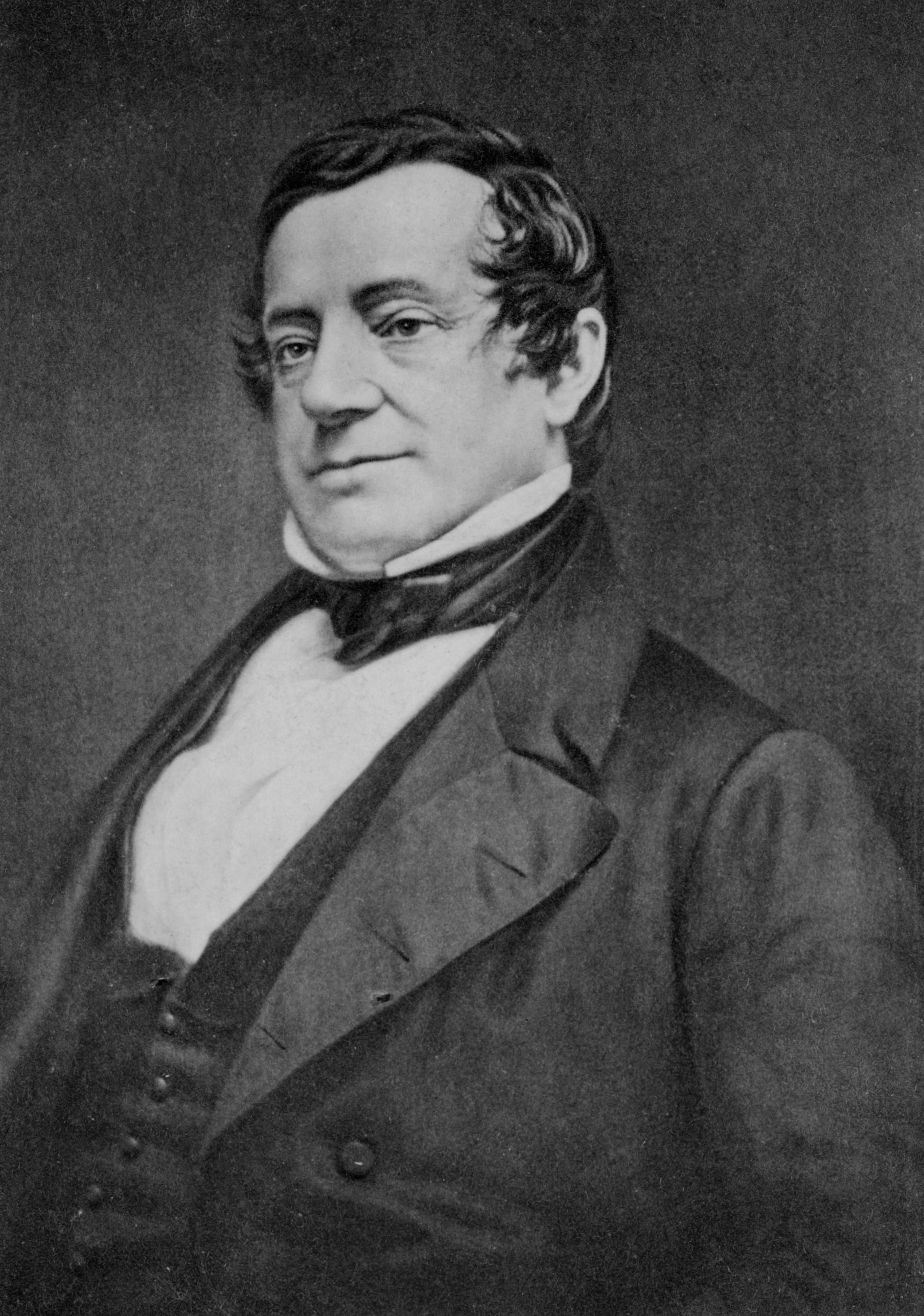
Washington Irving

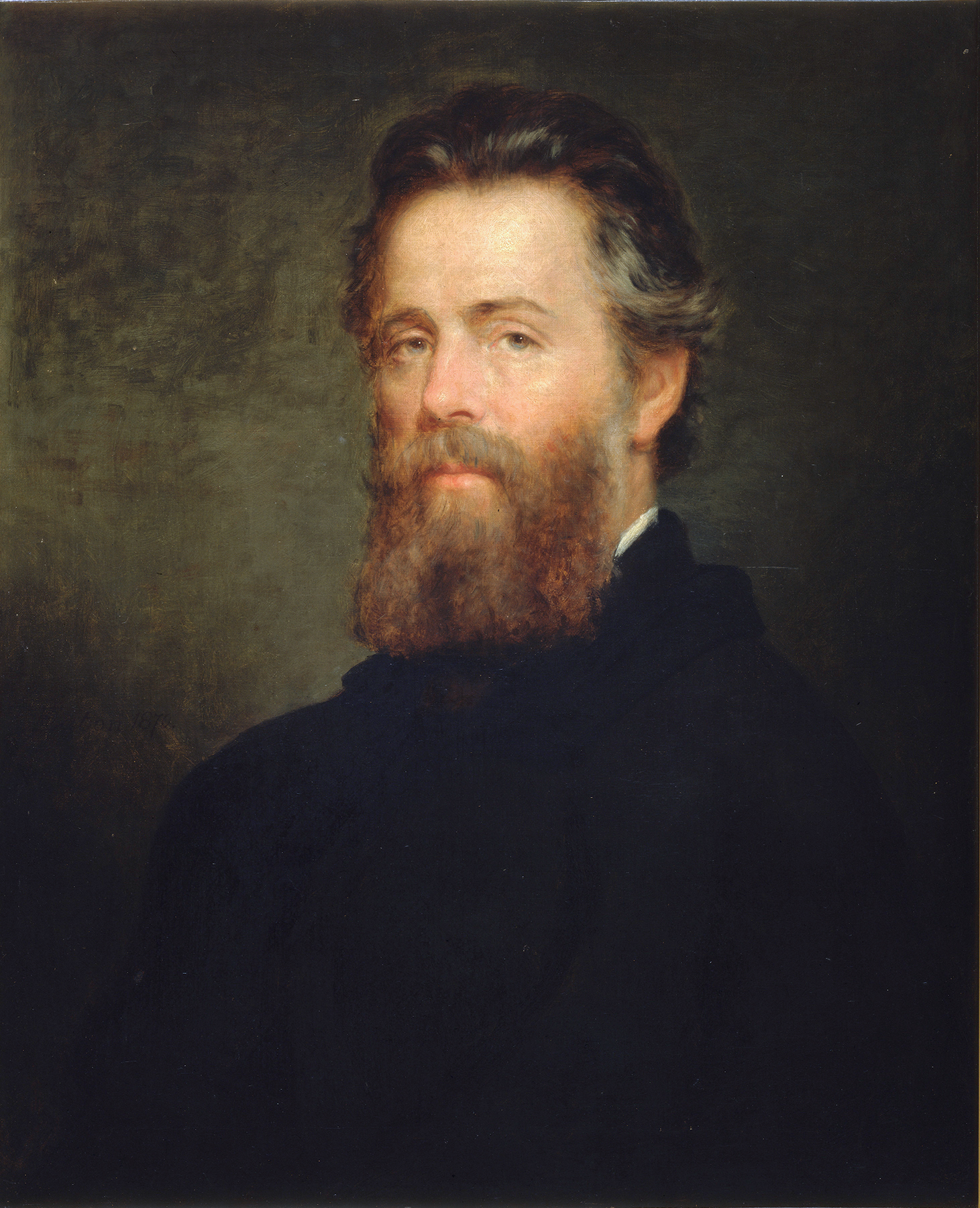
Herman Melville

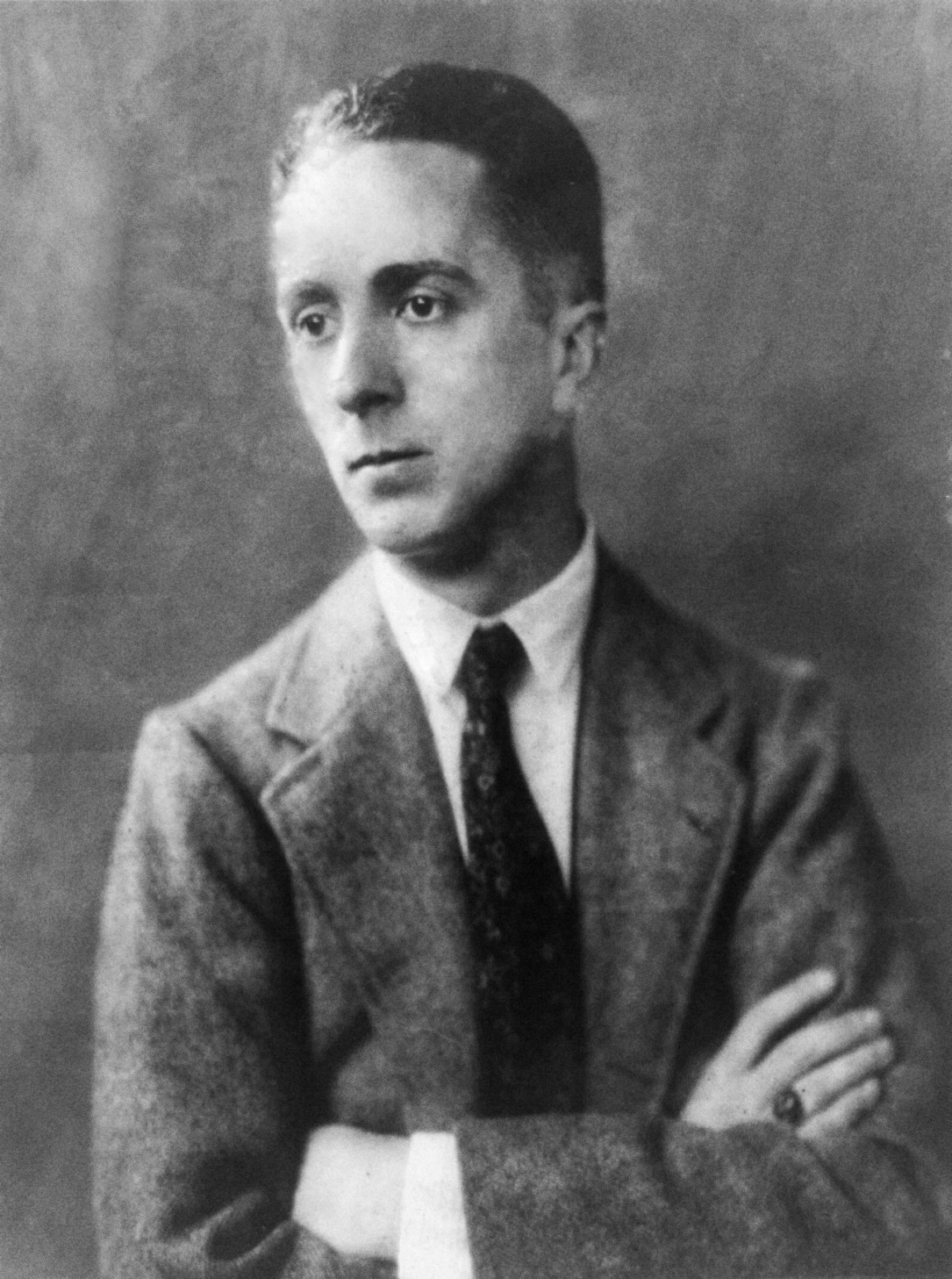
Norman Rockwell

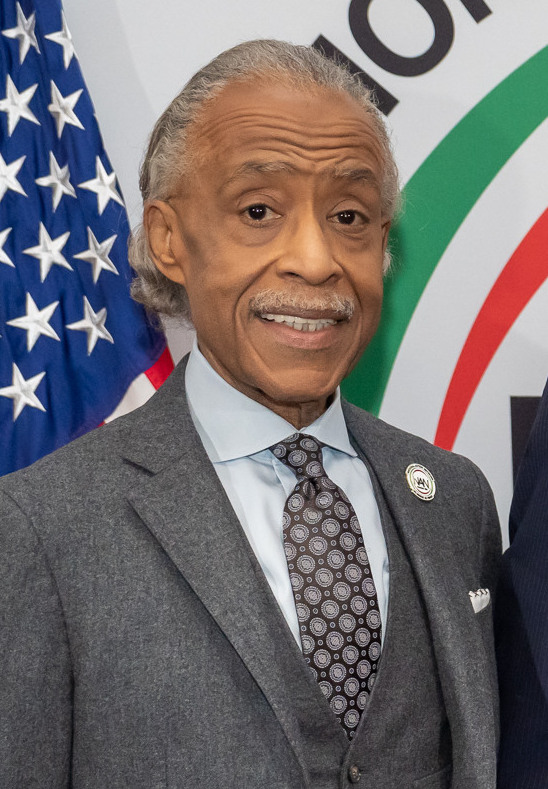
Al Sharpton

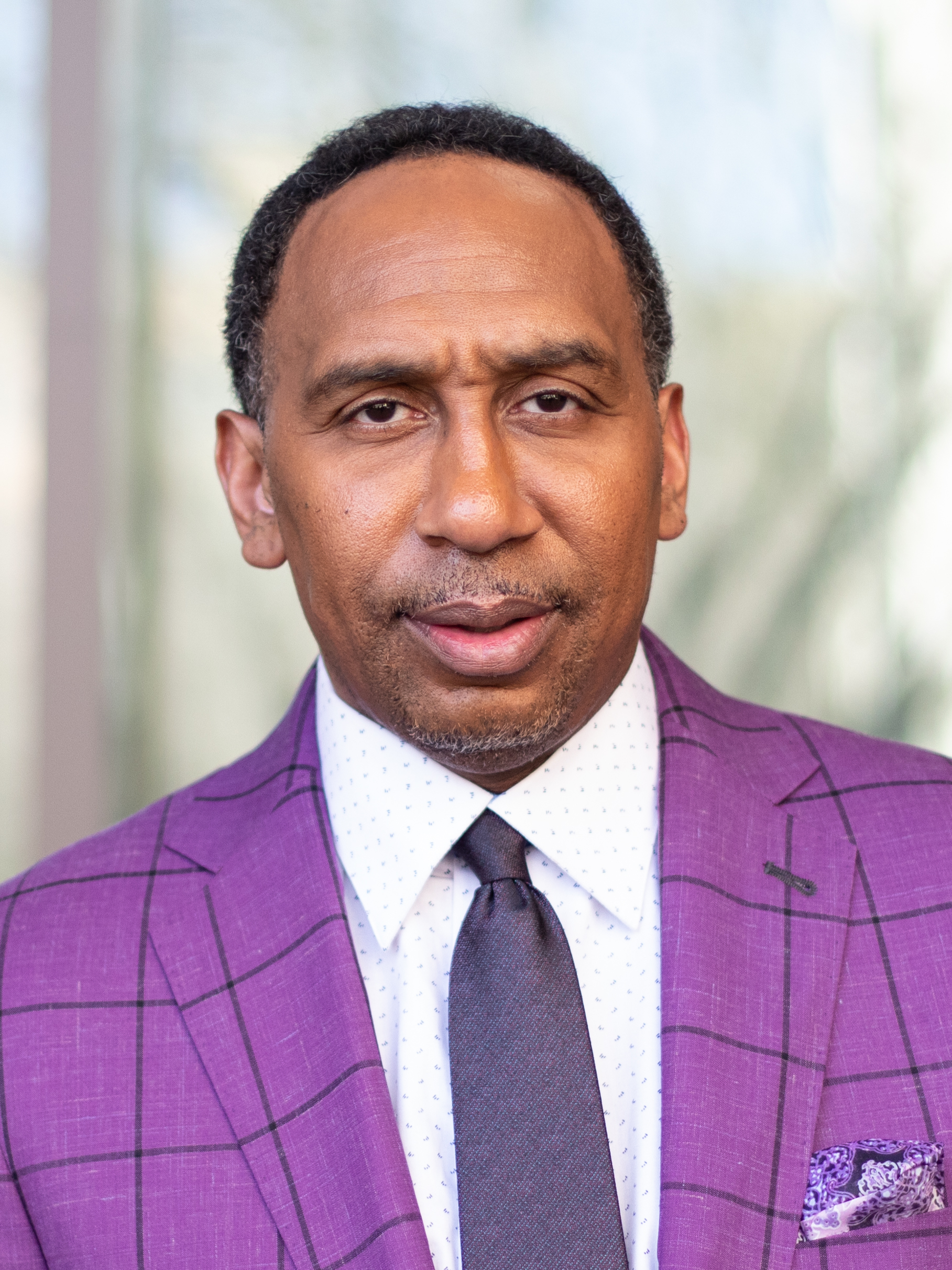
Stephen A. Smith

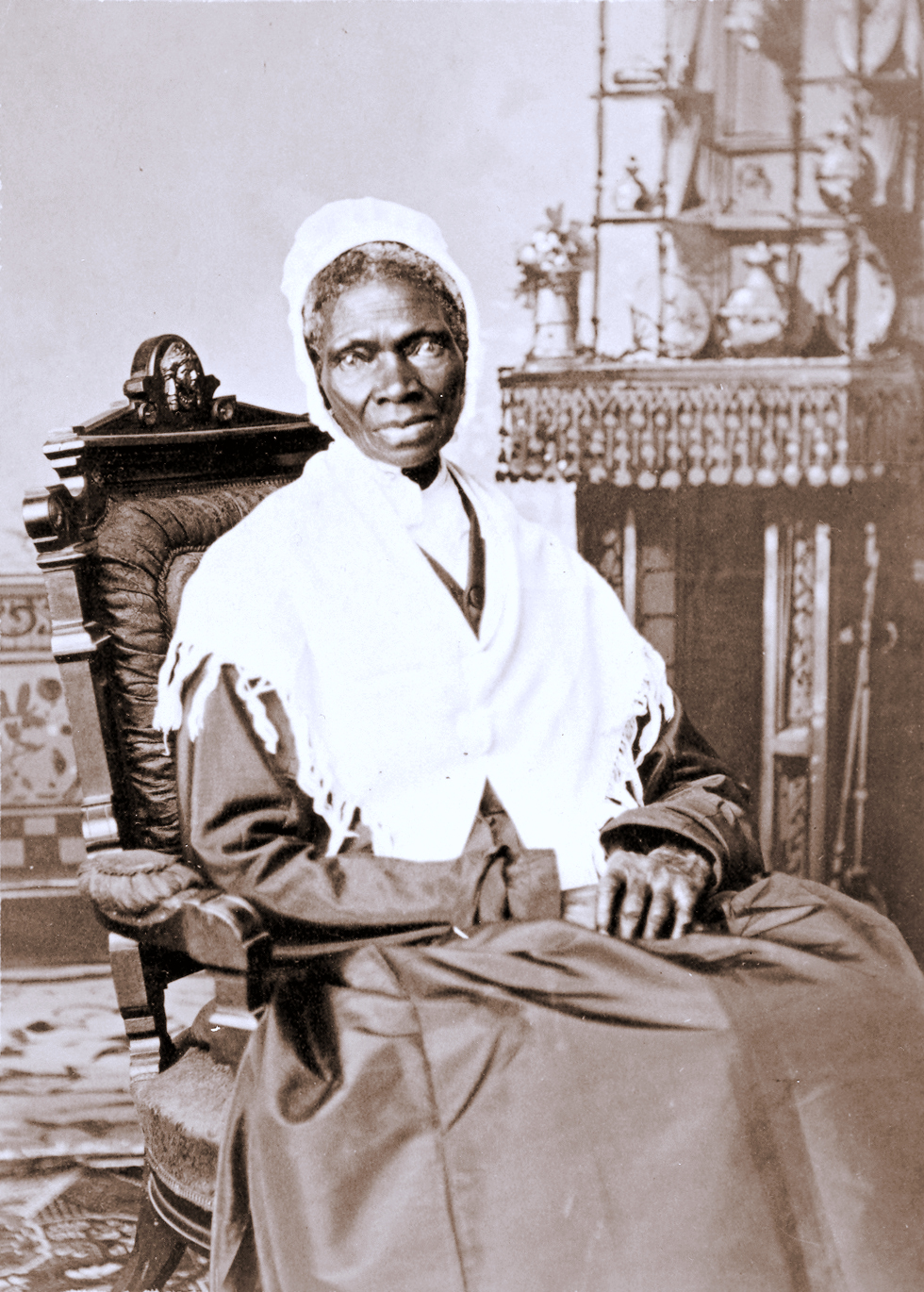
Sojourner Truth

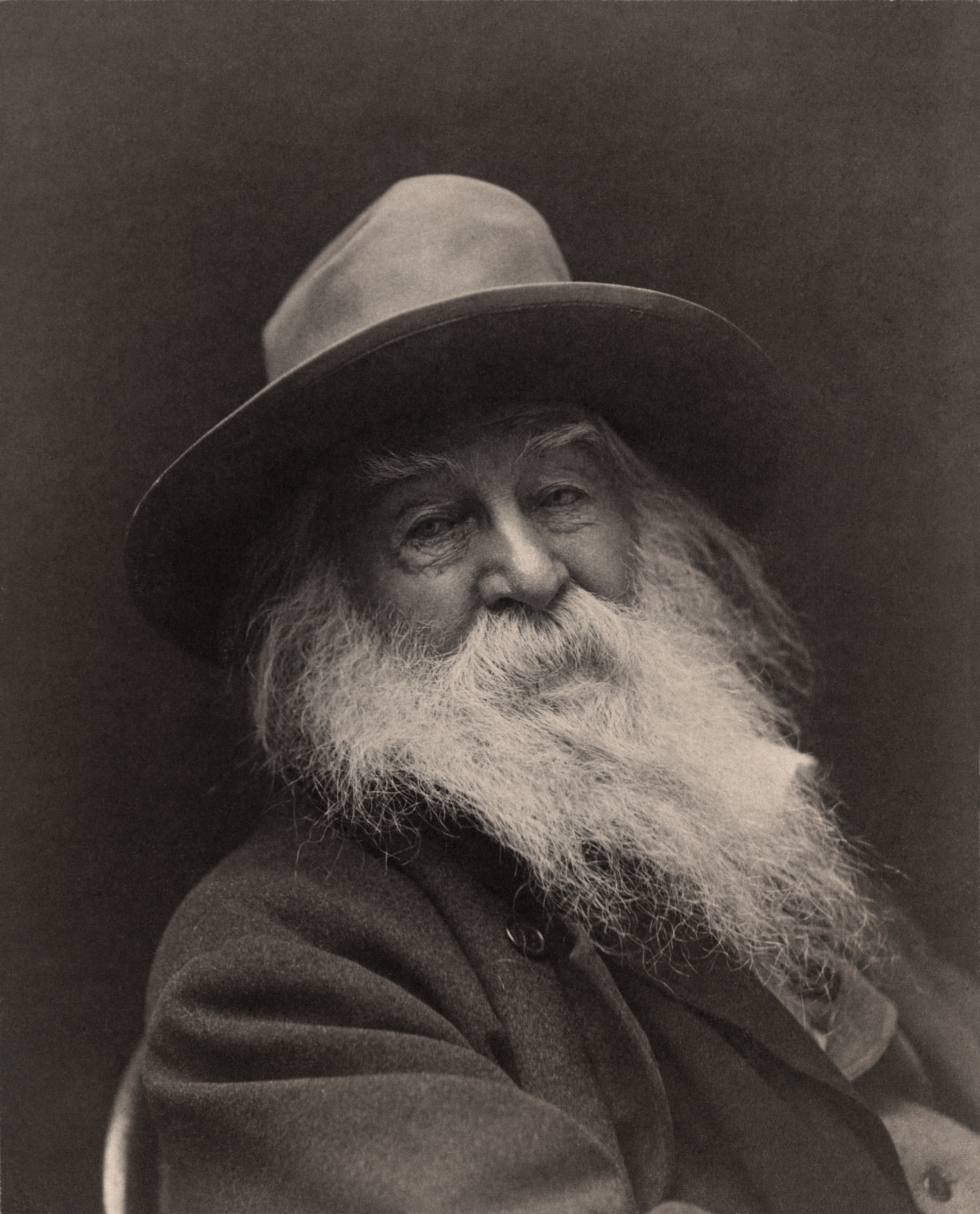
Walt Whitman

- Lois Bryan Adams (1817–1870), writer, newspaper editor/proprietor
- Samuel Hopkins Adams (1871–1958), muckraker; born in Dunkirk
- Scott Adams (born 1957), cartoonist and creator of Dilbert
- George Worsley Adamson (1913–2005), illustrator and cartoonist
- Nancy H. Adsit (1825–1902), art educator
- Marv Albert (born 1941), basketball announcer on TNT
- Esther Saville Allen (1837–1913), author
- Lavilla Esther Allen (1834–1903), writer, poet, reader
- Estelle Mendell Amory (1845–1923), author
- Susan B. Anthony (1820–1906), women's rights activist
- Cory Arcangel (born 1978), post-conceptual artist
- Tore Asplund (1903–1977), painter
- Emma Whitcomb Babcock (1849–1926), litterateur, author
- William Bliss Baker (1859–1886), landscape painter
- James Baldwin (1924–1987), writer and civil rights activist
- Mary E. C. Bancker (1860–1921), author
- Josephine Cushman Bateham (1829–1901), reformer, editor, writer
- Lydia Baxter (1809–1874), poet, hymnist
- Lewis White Beck (1913-1997), philosopher, author, editor
- Lauren Belfer, author
- J. Bowyer Bell (1931–2003), historian, artist and art critic
- Timothy D. Bellavia (born 1971), artist and illustrator
- Emma Lee Benedict (1857–1937), author, editor
- Louise Blanchard Bethune (1856–1913), architect
- Jennie M. Bingham (1859–1933), author
- Suessa Baldridge Blaine (1860–1932), writer of temperance pageants
- Wolf Blitzer (born 1948), CNN journalist, host of The Situation Room
- Lawrence Block (born 1938), author
- Howard Bloom (born 1943), author
- Sophia Braeunlich (1854–1898), journalist
- Joseph Brodsky (1940–1996), Russian-American poet
- Dale Brown (born 1956), author
- Phoebe Hinsdale Brown (1783–1861), hymnist
- William F. Buckley Jr. (1925–2008), conservative writer, public intellectual, political commentator and novelist
- Gordon Bunshaft (1909–1990), architect
- Charles E. Burchfield (1893–1967), artist
- Iris Chang (1968–2004), author, journalist, human rights activist
- Caroline Chesebro' (1825–1873), writer, publisher
- Charles Clough (born 1951), artist
- Jane Elizabeth Conklin (1831–1914), journalist, writer
- Frances Augusta Conant (1842–1903), journalist, editor
- Anderson Cooper (born 1967), CNN journalist and television personality
- Howard Cosell (1918–1995), ABC Sports broadcaster 1953–1985
- Bob Costas (born 1952), longtime broadcaster for NBC Sports and television host of 12 Olympic Games
- Burton Crane (1901–1963), journalist
- Robert Creeley (1926–2005), poet
- Jasper Francis Cropsey (1823–1900), artist
- Arthur B. Davies (1863–1928), artist
- Helen Aldrich De Kroyft (1818–1915), author
- Don DeLillo (born 1936), author
- Melvil Dewey (1851–1931), originator of Dewey Decimal System
- Amy Dickinson (born 1959), Chicago Tribune advice columnist
- Anna Bowman Dodd (1858–1929), author
- Amanda Minnie Douglas (1831–1916), writer
- Frederick Douglass (1818–1895), editor and publisher of abolitionist newspapers such as The North Star
- Arthur Dove (1880–1946), artist
- E. J. Eames (1813–1856), writer, poet
- Philip Evergood (1901–1973), artist
- Emma Pike Ewing (1838–1917), educator, author
- Mary Galentine Fenner (1839–1903), poet, litterateur
- Laura Dayton Fessenden (1852–1924), author
- Leslie Fiedler (1917–2003), literary critic
- Steve Fiorilla (1961–2009), artist
- Ira Joe Fisher (born 1947), author and weatherman; born and raised in Little Valley
- F. Scott Fitzgerald (1896–1940), author; raised in Buffalo
- Edith Willis Linn Forbes (1865–1945), poet, writer
- Helen Frankenthaler (1928–2011), artist
- Kelly Freas (1922–2005), artist
- Anna Katharine Green (1846–1935), author
- E.B. Green (1855–1950), architect
- Julia Boynton Green (1861–1957), poet
- Terry Gross (born 1951), radio host of Fresh Air
- Caren Gussoff, author
- Savannah Guthrie (born 1971), anchor for Today show
- Alex Haley (1921–1992, author of Roots
- Mary C. F. Hall-Wood (1842/3–1899), poet, author
- Sean Hannity (born 1961), radio and television talk show host
- Alfred Harvey (1913–1994), writer and publisher; founder of Harvey Comics
- Richard Hofstadter (1916–1970), author and philosopher
- Robert L. Holmes (born 1935), philosopher, author, international lecturer
- Paul Horgan (1903–1995), author
- Roni Horn (born 1955), artist
- Elbert Hubbard (1856–1915), philosopher and writer
- Sibyl Marvin Huse (1866–1939), author and teacher
- Idil Ibrahim, director
- Marilla Baker Ingalls (1828–1902), missionary, writer
- Washington Irving (1783–1859), author of Rip Van Winkle and The Legend of Sleepy Hollow
- Florence Carpenter Ives (1854–1900), journalist
- Henry James (1843–1916), author
- William James (1842–1910), philosopher
- Sally Jenkins (born 1960), sports columnist and feature writer for The Washington Post, and author
- Electa Amanda Wright Johnson (1838–1929), philanthropist, writer
- James A. Johnson (1865–1939), architect
- Mary Catherine Judd (1852–1930s), educator, author, peace activist
- Frank Judge, poet and translator
- Michael Kay (born 1961), play-by-play announcer for the New York Yankees
- Ellsworth Kelly (1923–2015), artist
- Megyn Kelly (born 1970), political commentator
- John Kessel (born 1950), author
- Maria Brace Kimball (1852–1933), elocutionist, writer
- Larry King (1933–2021), television and radio host
- Verlyn Klinkenborg (born 1952), member of The New York Times writer and farmer; editorial board
- Nancy Kress (born 1948), author
- Matt Lauer (born 1957), anchor for The Today Show
- Zoe Leonard (born 1961), photographer and visual artist
- Martha D. Lincoln (1838–1911), author and journalist
- Robert Longo (born 1953), artist
- Mabel Dodge Luhan (1879–1962), writer and patron
- Bill Maher (born 1956), host of HBO political talk show Real Time with Bill Maher
- Norman Mailer (1923–2007), author
- Francis A. Mallison (1832–1877), journalist and helped organize the Great Civil War Gold Hoax; from Rome
- Helen A. Manville (1839–1912), poet, litterateur
- Brice Marden (1938–2023), artist
- Herman Melville (1819–1891), author of Moby-Dick
- Jenny B. Merrill (1854–1934), educator, writer
- Magdalene Merritt (1864–1935), poet
- Al Michaels (born 1944), longtime sportscaster for both NBC Sports and ABC Sports; play-by-play announcer on Sunday Night Football
- Nettie Leila Michel (1863–1912), magazine editor, writer
- Marion Juliet Mitchell (1836–1917), poet
- Aja Monet, contemporary poet, writer, lyricist and activist – Brooklyn
- David Muir (born 1973), ABC journalist and anchor
- Ogden Nash (1902–1971), poet
- Minerva Brace Norton (1837–1894), educator, author
- Morilla M. Norton (1865–1916), author, poet
- Emily S. Oakey (1829–1883), poet, hymnist
- Joyce Carol Oates (born 1938), author
- Jessie Fremont O'Donnell (1860–1897), writer, lecturer
- Elizabeth M. Olmsted (1825–1910), poet
- Bill O'Reilly (born 1949), host of The O'Reilly Factor on Fox News
- Anna Campbell Palmer (1854–1928), author
- Fanny Purdy Palmer (1839–1923), writer, poet
- Jane Marsh Parker (1836–1913), author, historian, clubwoman
- William Ordway Partridge (1861–1930), sculptor
- Jane Lippitt Patterson (1829–1919), writer, editor
- Margaret B. Peeke (1838–1908), lecturer, author
- Sarah Maria Clinton Perkins (1824–1905), minister, social reformer, editor, author
- Tim Powers (born 1952), author
- Thomas Pynchon (born 1937), author
- Harriet Newell Ralston (1828–1920), poet
- Ishmael Reed (born 1938), poet
- John Reed (born 1969), author of Snowball's Chance
- Hope Reese, journalist and nonfiction author
- Emma May Alexander Reinertsen (1853–1920), writer
- Seymour Reit (1918–2001), writer and cartoonist
- Helen Hinsdale Rich (1827–1915), poet
- E. J. Richmond (1825–1918), author
- Norman Rockwell (1894–1978), painter
- Spain Rodriguez (1940–2012), cartoonist
- Milton Rogovin (1909–2011), photographer
- Charles Rohlfs (1853–1936), craftsman
- Al Roker (born 1954), weather anchor for NBC's Today
- Christopher Ross (1931–2023), sculptor
- Tim Russert (1950–2008), host of NBC's Meet the Press
- Vin Scully (1927–2022), longtime broadcaster for the Los Angeles Dodgers
- David Sedaris (born 1956), humorist and author
- Mary Alice Seymour (1837–1897), music critic
- Emma Augusta Sharkey (1858–1902), journalist, writer
- Al Sharpton (born 1954), civil rights activist and radio talk show host
- Emma L. Shaw (1840–1924), magazine editor
- Grace Carew Sheldon (1855–1921), journalist, writer, editor
- Tony Sisti (1901–1983), painter
- Jeanie Oliver Davidson Smith (1836–1925), poet, romancist
- Lura Eugenie Brown Smith (1854/64–1935), journalist, newspaper editor, writer
- Harriet Mabel Spalding (1862–1935), poet, litterateur
- Eugene Speicher (1883–1962), painter
- Stephen A. Smith (born 1967), television personality, radio host, and sports analyst
- Amelia M. Starkweather (1840–1926), educator, author
- Esther Baker Steele (1835–1911), educator, author, editor, philanthropist
- John Steinbeck (1902–1968), novelist, writer
- Cynthia Morgan St. John (1852–1919), Wordsworthian, book collector, and author
- Baby Storme, alt-pop singer
- Fran Striker (1903–1962), creator of the Lone Ranger and Green Hornet
- Elizabeth Swados (1951–2016), author
- Susie Forrest Swift (1862–1916), editor
- Jake Tapper (born 1969), news anchor for CNN
- Richard Clyde Taylor (1919-2003), philosopher, author, editor, apiarist
- Dorothy Thompson (1983–1961), journalist and radio broadcaster
- Louis Comfort Tiffany (1848–1933), artist
- Mike Tirico (born 1966), sportscaster
- Tom Toles (born 1951), cartoonist
- Sojourner Truth (1797–1883), slave and civil rights activist
- Israel Tsvaygenbaum (born 1961), Russian-American artist
- Colin Murray Turbayne (1916-2006), philosopher, author, editor
- Mark Twain (1835–1910), author
- Andrew Vachss (1942–2021), author, activist, and lawyer
- Mary Crowell Van Benschoten (1840–1921), author, newspaper publisher/editor
- Emily Elizabeth Veeder (1841–1898), author
- Richard A. Waite (1848–1911), architect
- J. Alden Weir (1852–1919), painter
- Jane Meade Welch (1854–1931), journalist
- Edith Wharton (1862–1937), author
- Walt Whitman (1819–1892), poet
- Marion Wiesel (1931–2025), Austrian-American Holocaust survivor, humanitarian, and translator
- Brian Williams (born 1959), anchor of NBC Nightly News
- Jeneverah M. Winton (1837–1904), author, poet
- Julia McNair Wright (1840–1903), author
- Marie Robinson Wright (1853–1914), writer
- Julia Ditto Young (1857–1915), novelist, poet
- John Zogby (born 1948), pollster and blogger

== Sportspeople ==
=== Baseball ===
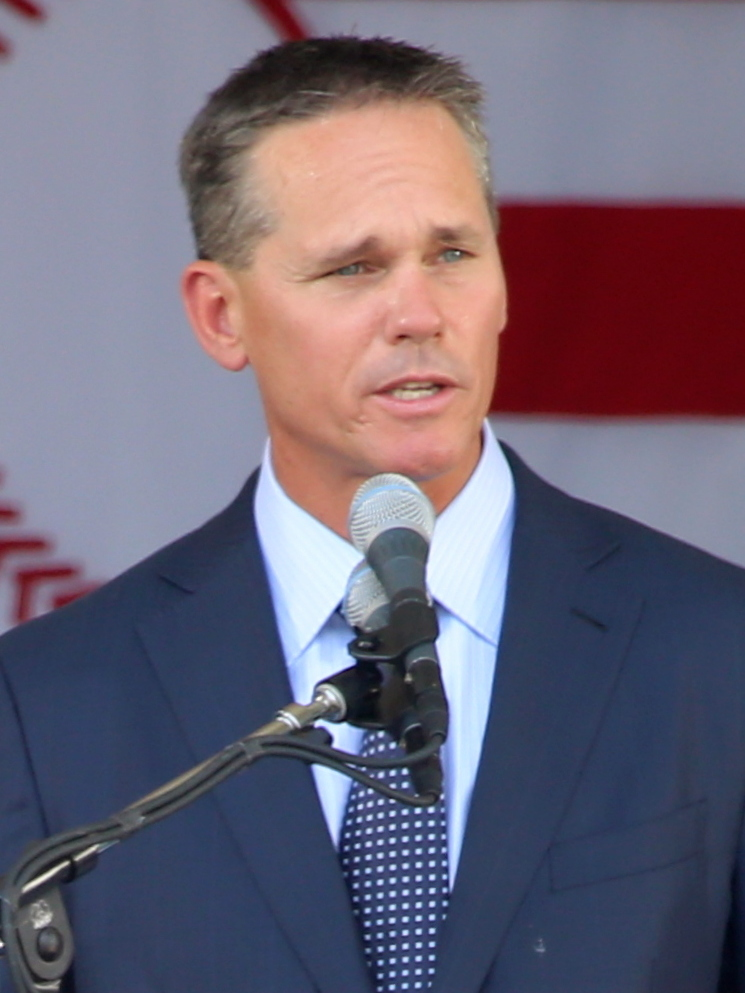
Craig Biggio

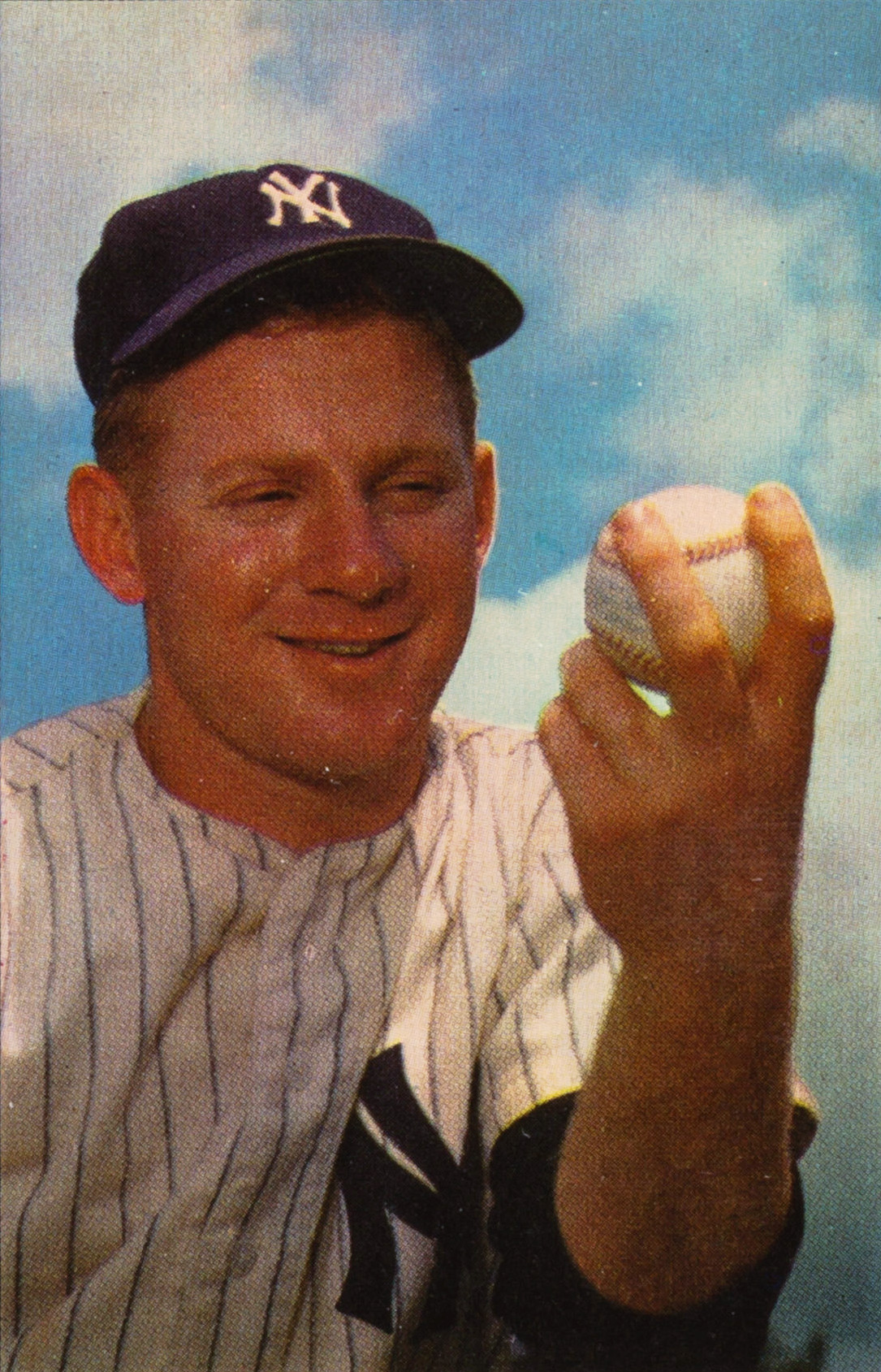
Whitey Ford

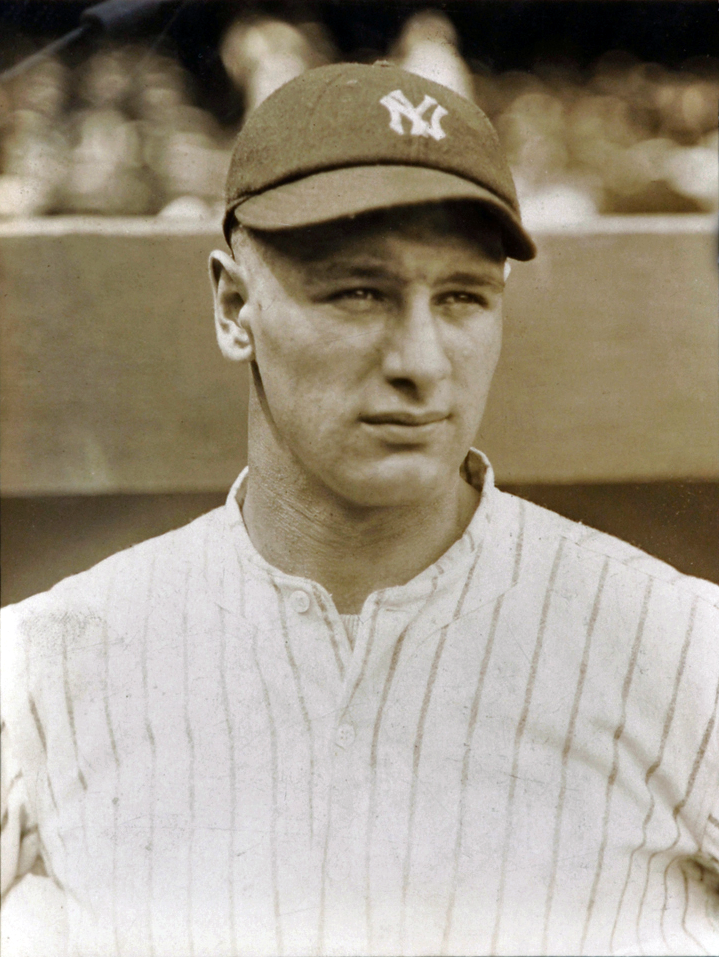
Lou Gehrig

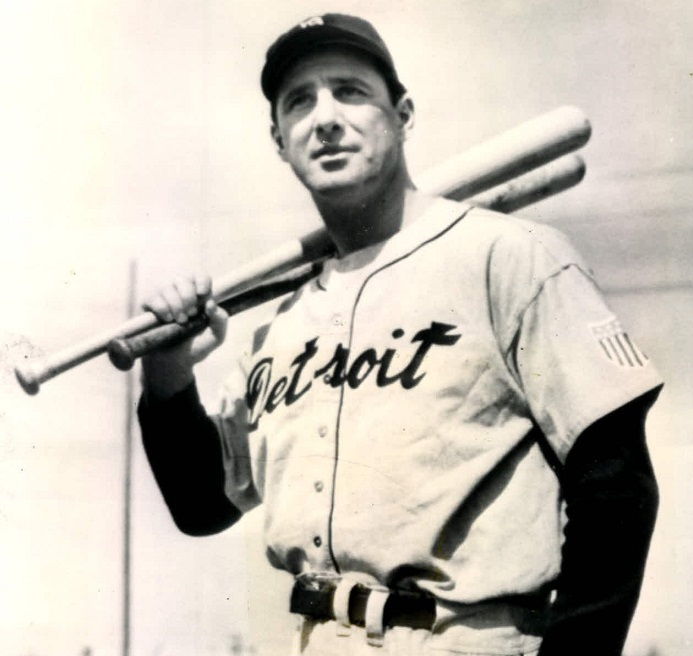
Hank Greenberg

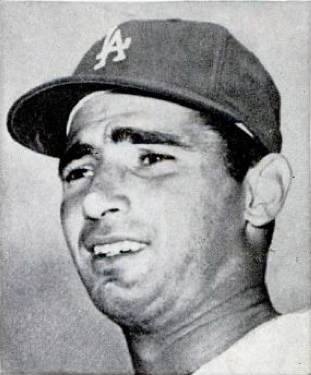
Sandy Koufax

- Harrison Bader (born 1994), Major League Baseball outfielder
- Moe Berg (1902–1972), Major League Baseball catcher and spy for the Office of Strategic Services
- Dellin Betances (born 1988), baseball pitcher
- Craig Biggio (born 1965), Baseball Hall of Famer
- Bobby Bonilla (born 1963), baseball player
- Ralph Branca (1926–2016), baseball pitcher
- Ken Brett (1948–2003), baseball pitcher
- Dan Brouthers (1858–1932), Baseball Hall of Famer
- Alexander Cartwright (1820–1892), "father of modern baseball", founding member of the New York Knickerbockers Base Ball Club
- Eddie Collins (1887–1951), Baseball Hall of Famer
- Jimmy Collins (1870–1943), Baseball Hall of Famer
- Bill Dahlen (1870–1950), baseball player
- George Davis (1870–1940), Baseball Hall of Famer
- Harry Eisenstat (1915–2003), baseball player
- Mike Epstein (born 1943), Major League Baseball first baseman
- Johnny Evers (1881–1947), Baseball Hall of Famer
- Whitey Ford (1928–2020), Baseball Hall of Famer
- John Franco (born 1960), baseball pitcher
- Frankie Frisch (1897–1973), Baseball Hall of Famer
- Lou Gehrig (1903–1941), Baseball Hall of Famer
- Sid Gordon (1917–1975), two-time All-Star major league baseball player
- Hank Greenberg (1911–1986), Baseball Hall of Famer (Greenwich Village)
- Bucky Harris (1896–1977), baseball manager
- Orel Hershiser (born 1958), baseball player and announcer
- Waite Hoyt (1899–1984), Baseball Hall of Famer
- Joe Kehoskie (born 1973), baseball executive; born in Auburn
- Willie Keeler (1872–1923), Baseball Hall of Famer
- King Kelly (1857–1894), Baseball Hall of Famer
- Sandy Koufax (born 1935), Baseball Hall of Famer
- Tim Locastro (born 1992), baseball player; born in Syracuse
- Rob Manfred (born 1958), MLB commissioner; born in Rome
- Jason Marquis (born 1978), Major League Baseball All-Star pitcher
- Edgar Martínez (born 1963), baseball player
- John McGraw (1873–1934), baseball manager; born in Truxton
- Bid McPhee (1859–1943), Baseball Hall of Famer
- Bob Melvin (born 1961), baseball player and manager
- Sam Nahem (1915–2004), Major League Baseball pitcher
- Joe Nathan (born 1974), baseball player, Minnesota Twins; born in Pine Bush
- Jim Palmer (born 1945), Baseball Hall of Famer
- A. J. Pierzynski (born 1976), baseball player (Chicago White Sox); born in Bridgehampton
- Lipman Pike (1845–1893), Major League Baseball player; two-time home run champion
- Old Hoss Radbourn (1854–1897), Baseball Hall of Famer
- Phil Rizzuto (1917–2007), Baseball Hall of Famer
- Alex Rodriguez (born 1975), Major League Baseball player
- Saul Rogovin (1923–1995), Major League Baseball pitcher
- Richie Scheinblum (1942–2021), Major League Baseball All-Star outfielder
- Norm Sherry (1931–2021), catcher, manager, and coach in Major League Baseball
- Mose Solomon (1900–1966), the "Rabbi of Swat", Major League Baseball player
- Warren Spahn (1921–2003), Baseball Hall of Famer
- Joe Torre (born 1940), baseball player, manager, and executive
- Mickey Welch (1859–1941), Baseball Hall of Famer
- Lou Whitaker (born 1957), baseball player
- Deacon White (1847–1939), Baseball Hall of Famer
- Carl Yastrzemski (born 1939), Baseball Hall of Famer

=== Basketball ===
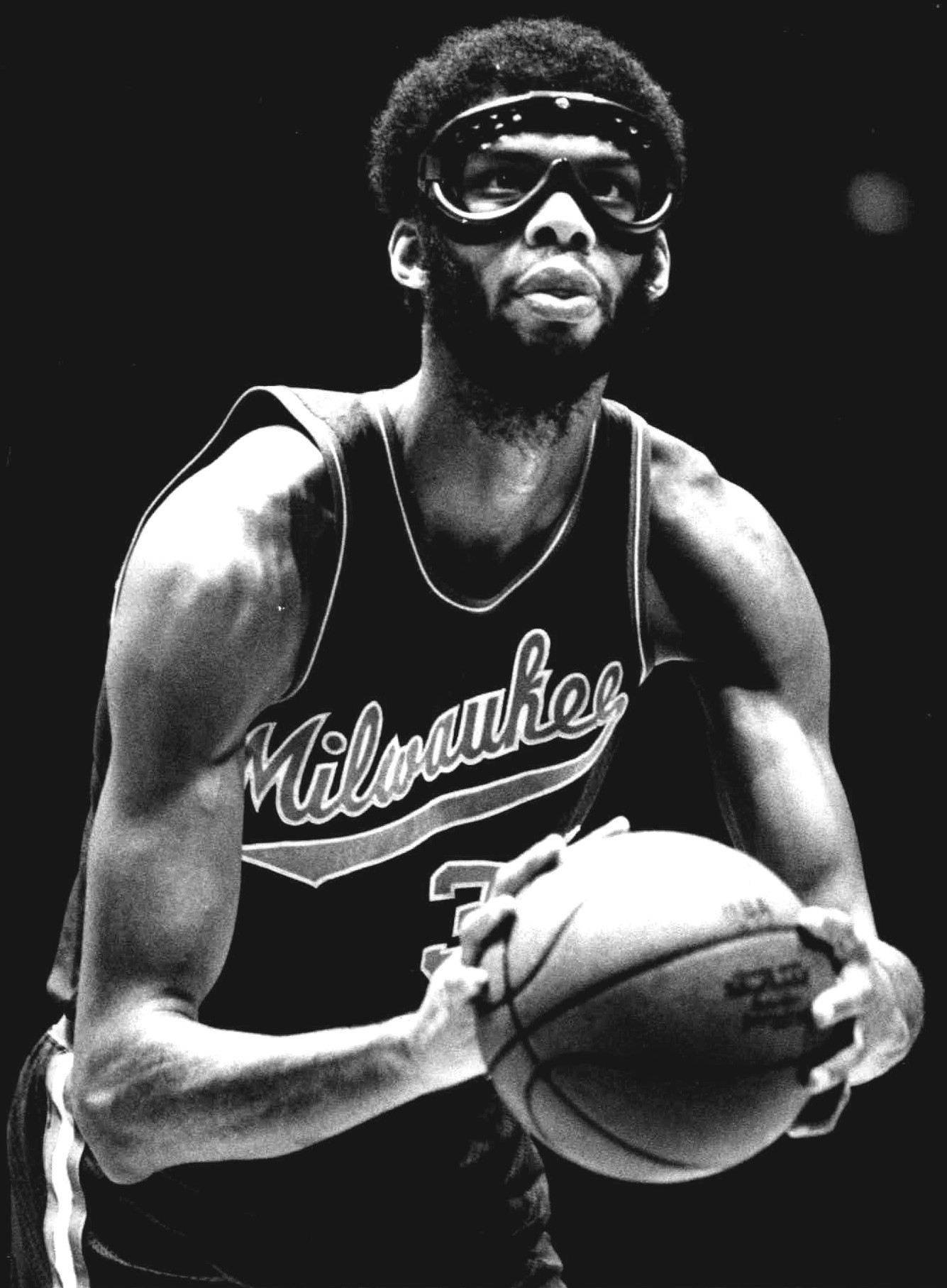
Kareem Abdul-Jabbar

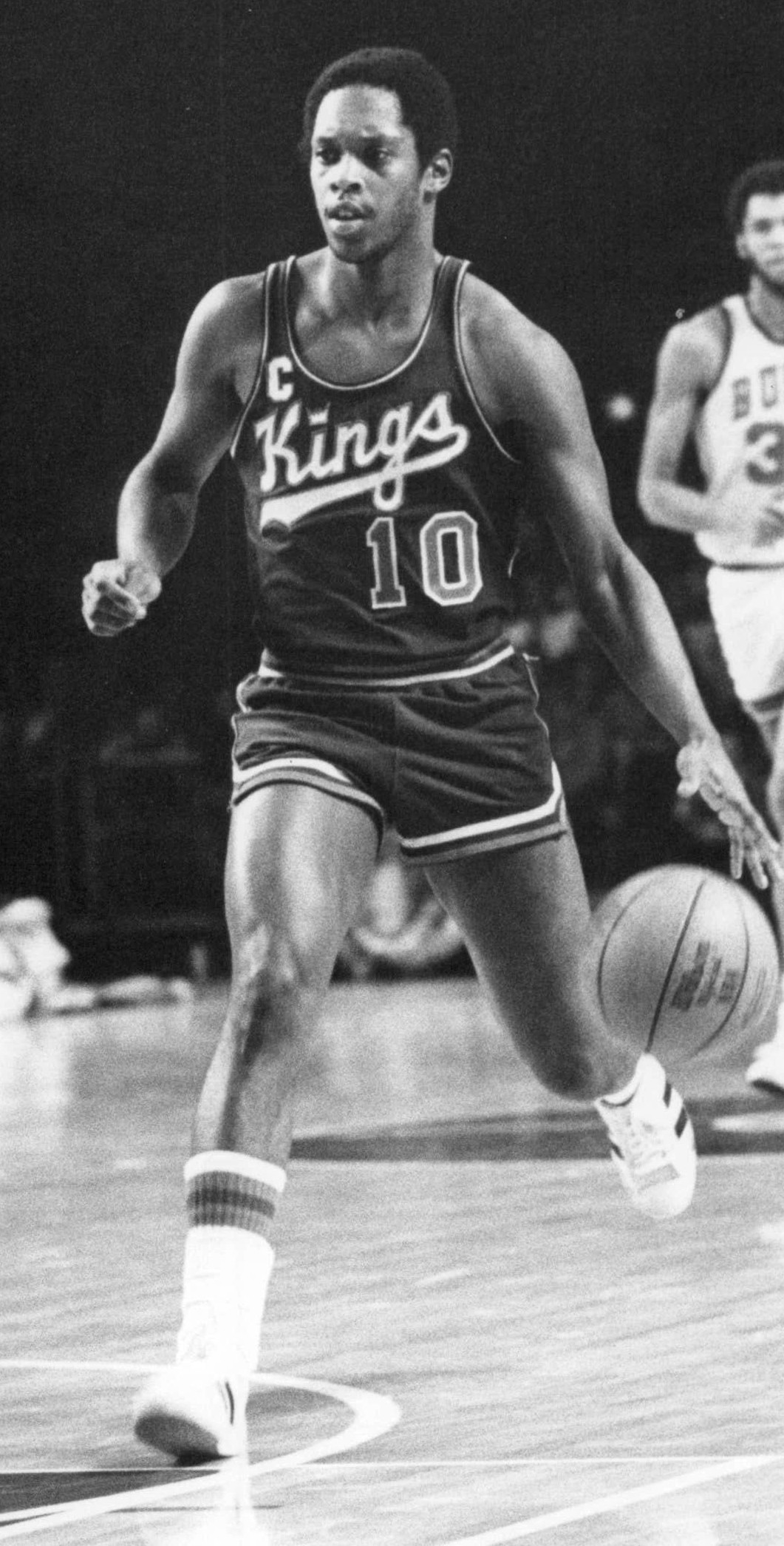
Nate Archibald

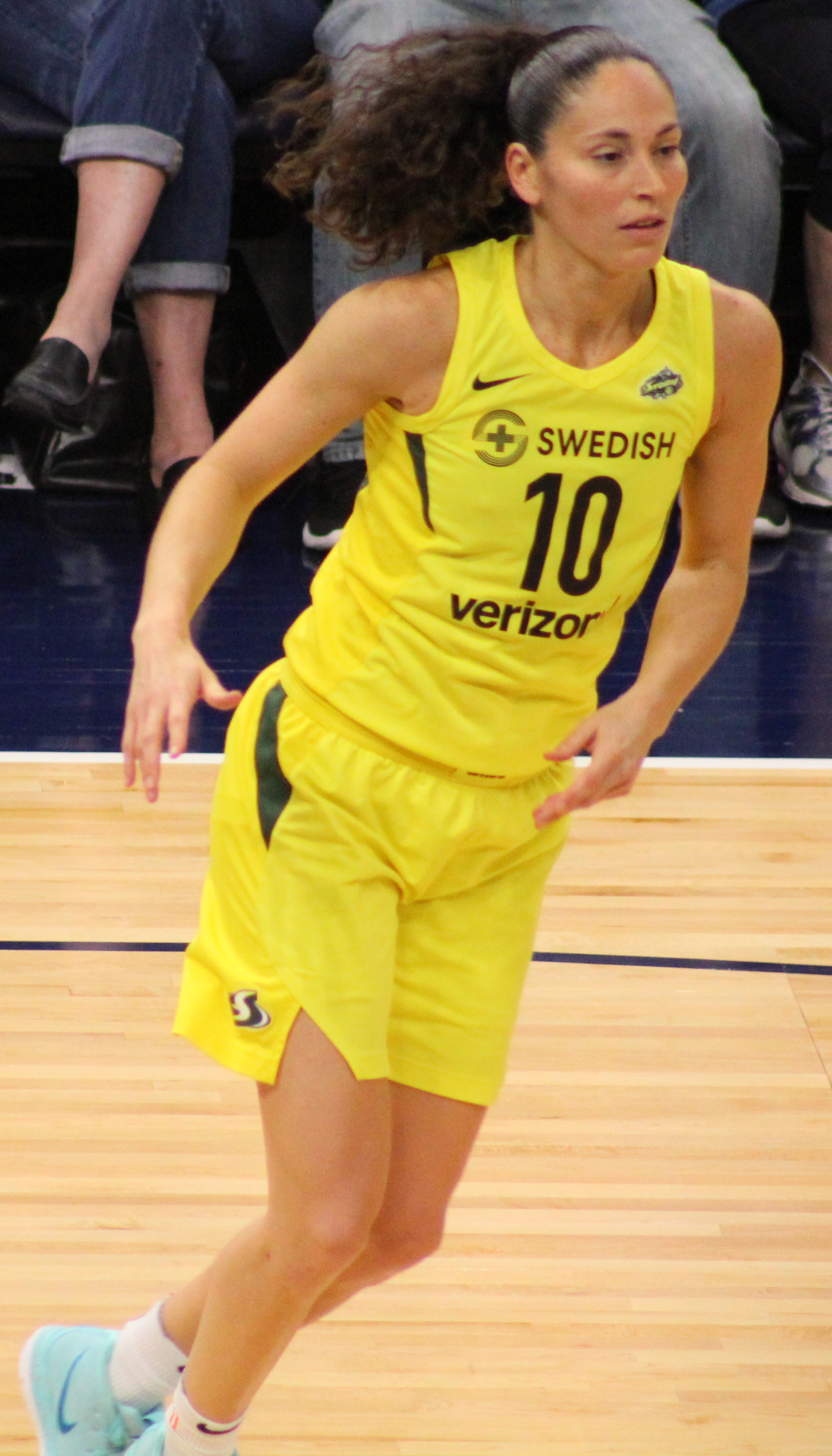
Sue Bird

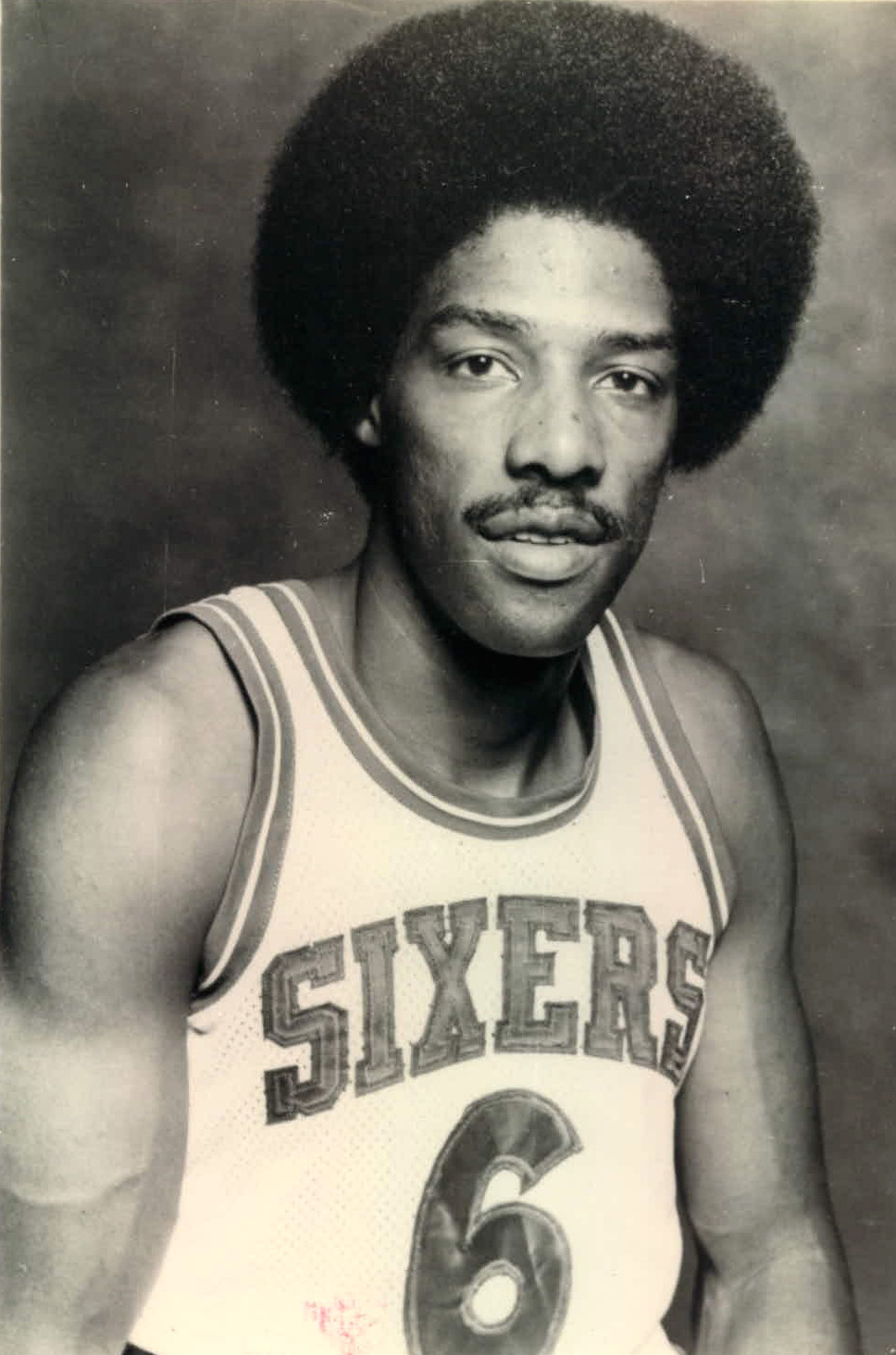
Julius Erving

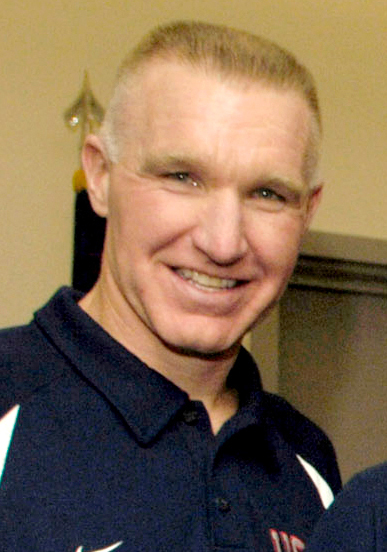
Chris Mullin

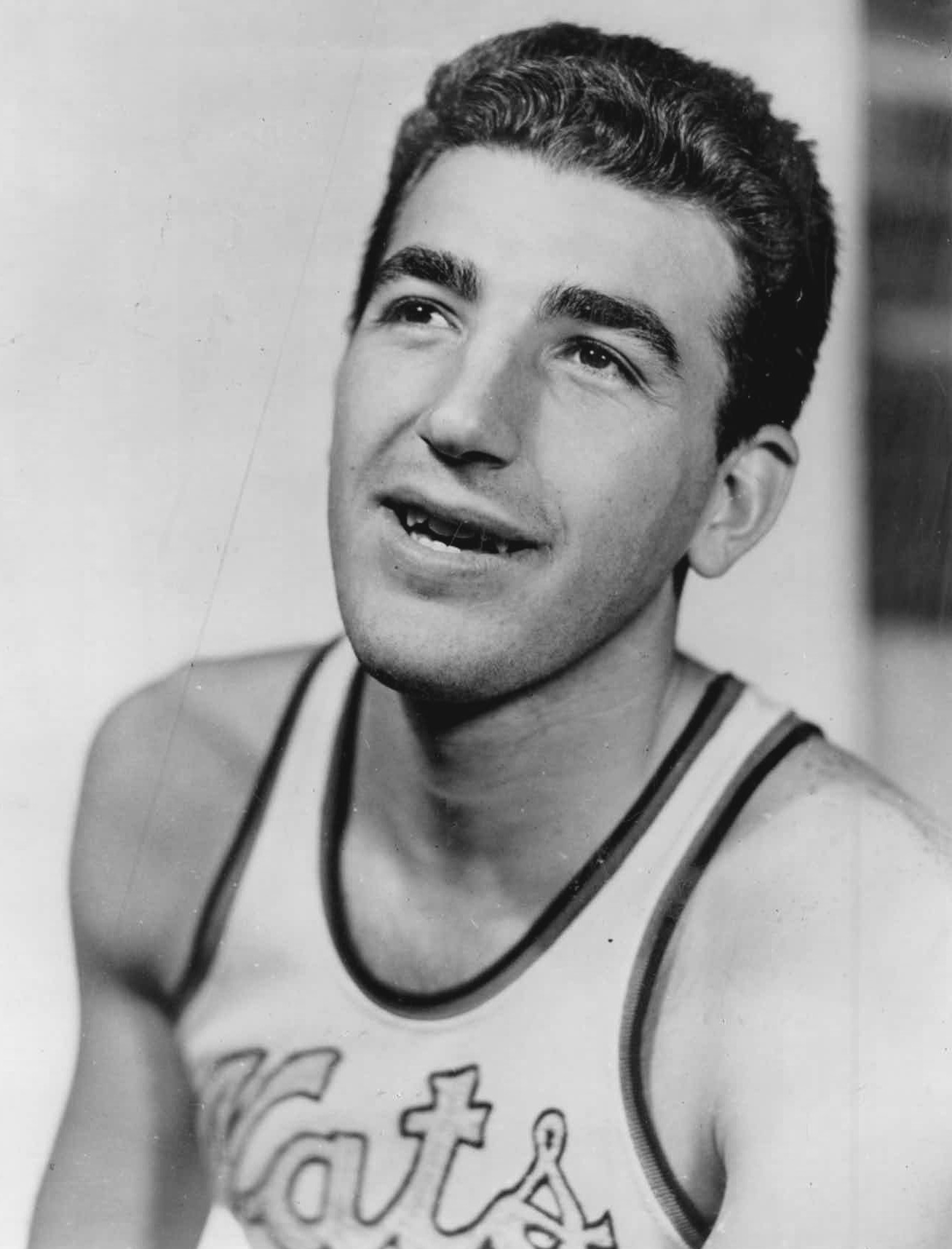
Dolph Schayes

- Kareem Abdul-Jabbar (born 1947), NBA Hall of Fame player
- Rawle Alkins (born 1997), basketball player in the NBA and Israeli Basketball Premier League
- Carmelo Anthony (born 1984), professional basketball player for the New York Knicks
- Nate Archibald (born 1948), NBA Hall of Fame basketball player
- Red Auerbach (1917–2006), basketball coach
- Desi Barmore (born 1960), basketball player
- David Bernsley (born 1969), American-Israeli basketball player
- Sue Bird (born 1980), Women's National Basketball Association point guard; two-time Olympic champion; four-time All-Star (Seattle Storm) (Syosset)
- Antonio Blakeney (born 1996), basketball player in the Israeli Basketball Premier League
- Harry Boykoff (1922–2001), professional basketball player for the Boston Celtics
- Larry Brown (born 1940), professional All Star basketball player and coach
- Isaiah Cousins (born 1994), basketball player in the Israeli Basketball Premier League
- Bob Cousy (born 1928), professional basketball player for the Boston Celtics
- Billy Cunningham (born 1943), basketball coach
- Jon Dalzell, basketball player
- John DiBartolomeo (born 1991), basketball player in the Israeli Basketball Premier League
- Billy Donovan (born 1965), basketball coach
- Shay Doron (born 1985), professional basketball player
- Bryant Dunston (born 1986), basketball player
- Julius Erving (born 1950), NBA player
- Mickey Fisher (1904/05–1963), basketball coach
- Marty Friedman (1889–1986), Hall of Fame pro basketball player and coach
- Marcus Gaither (1961–2020), basketball player
- Jimmy Hall (born 1994), basketball player in the Israeli National League
- Sidney Hertzberg (1922–2005), professional basketball player
- Art Heyman (1941–2012), professional basketball player
- Nat Holman (1896–1995), Hall of Fame basketball player
- Red Holzman (1920–1998), NBA Hall of Fame basketball player and coach
- Lamont Jones (born 1972), basketball player
- Michael Jordan (born 1963), iconic NBA Hall of Fame basketball player, businessman and owner/chairman of the Charlotte Hornets; considered the best basketball player of all time – Brooklyn
- Adam Kemp (born 1990), professional basketball player
- Sean Kilpatrick (born 1990), basketball player in NBA and for Hapoel Jerusalem of the Israeli Basketball Super League
- Ken Labanowski (born 1959), basketball player
- Christian Laettner (born 1969), former professional basketball player
- Sylven Landesberg (born 1990), basketball player
- Rudy LaRusso (1927–2004), professional basketball player
- Barry Leibowitz (born 1945), American-Israeli basketball player in the American Basketball Association and the Israeli Basketball Premier League
- Ivan Leshinsky (born 1947), American-Israeli basketball player
- Nancy Lieberman (born 1958), WNBA Hall of Fame basketball player, general manager, and coach (Olympic silver medal)
- Chris Mullin (born 1963), NBA Hall of Fame basketball player
- Boris Nachamkin (1933–2018), professional basketball player
- Joakim Noah (born 1985), professional basketball player (New York Knicks)
- Lamar Odom (born 1979), former professional basketball player
- Bernard Opper (1915–2000), professional basketball player
- Donna Orender (née Geils) (born 1957), college basketball player and Women's Professional Basketball League All-Star; WNBA president
- Rick Pitino (born 1952), basketball coach
- Tubby Raskin (1902–1981), basketball player and coach
- Pat Riley (born 1945), basketball player, coach, and executive; born in Rome
- Danny Schayes (born 1959), college and professional basketball player; son of Dolph Schayes
- Dolph Schayes (1928–2015), NBA Hall of Fame player and coach
- Ossie Schectman (1919–2013), basketball player; scored the first basket in NBA history
- Barney Sedran (1891–1964), NBA Hall of Fame basketball player
- Adam Silver (born 1962), NBA commissioner
- Lou Silver, basketball player
- Russ Smith, former NBA player, currently plays in the Israeli Basketball Premier League
- Alex Sobel (born 2000), basketball player in the Israeli Basketball Premier League
- Sid Tannenbaum (1925–1986), professional basketball player
- Jacob Toppin (born 2000), basketball player in the Israeli Basketball Premier League, formerly in the NBA
- Mark Turenshine (1944–2016), basketball player
- Jim Valvano (1946–1993), basketball coach
- Kemba Walker (born 1990), professional basketball player for the Charlotte Hornets
- Isaiah Whitehead (born 1995), player for the Brooklyn Nets (NBA), now in the Israeli Basketball Premier League
- Metta World Peace (born 1979), former professional basketball player
- Max Zaslofsky (1925–1985), professional basketball player

=== Boxing ===
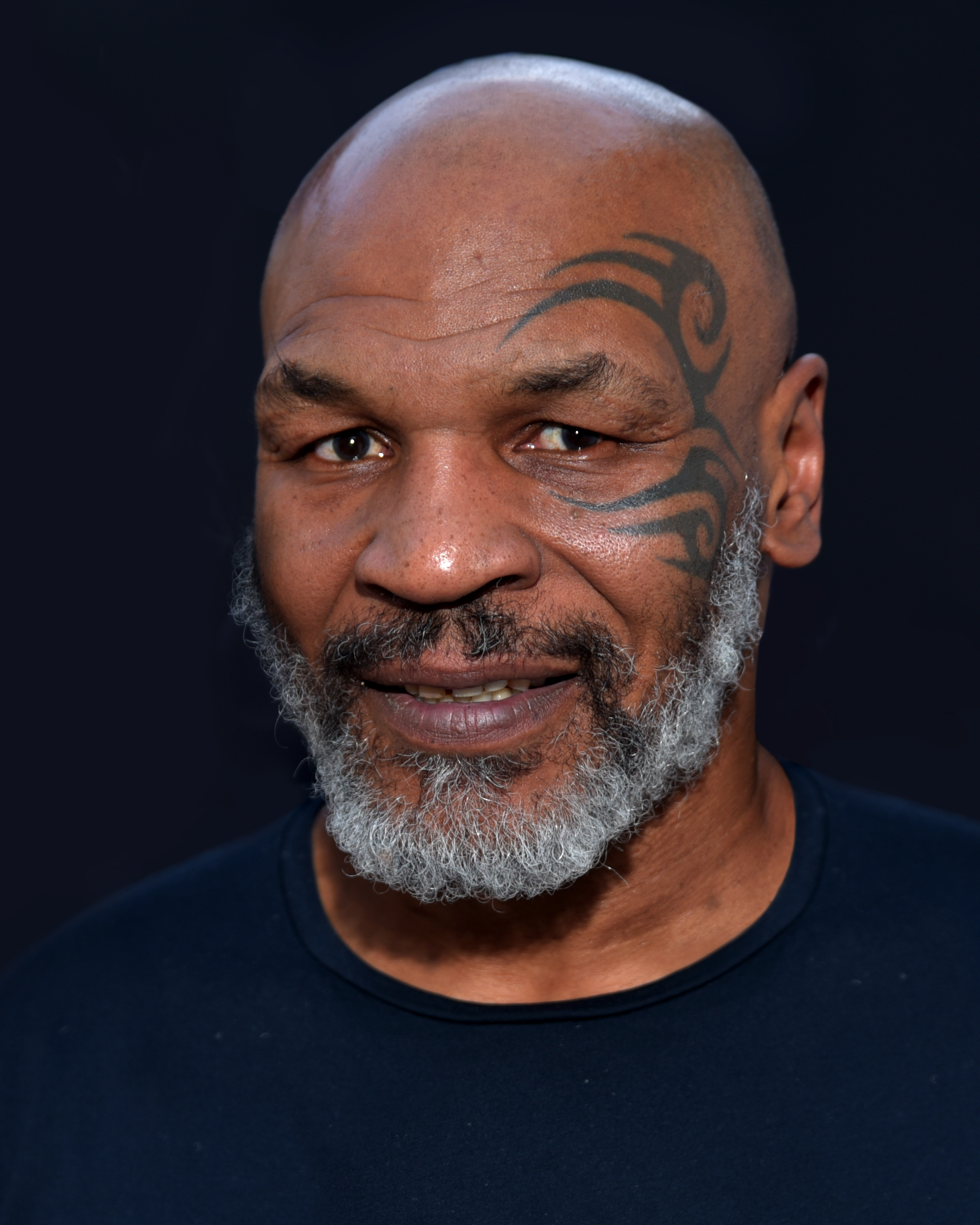
Mike Tyson

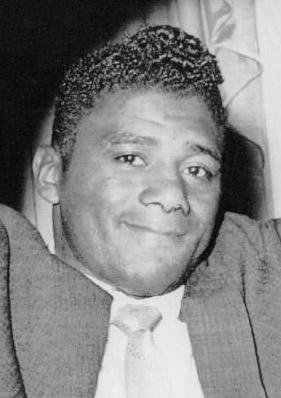
Floyd Patterson

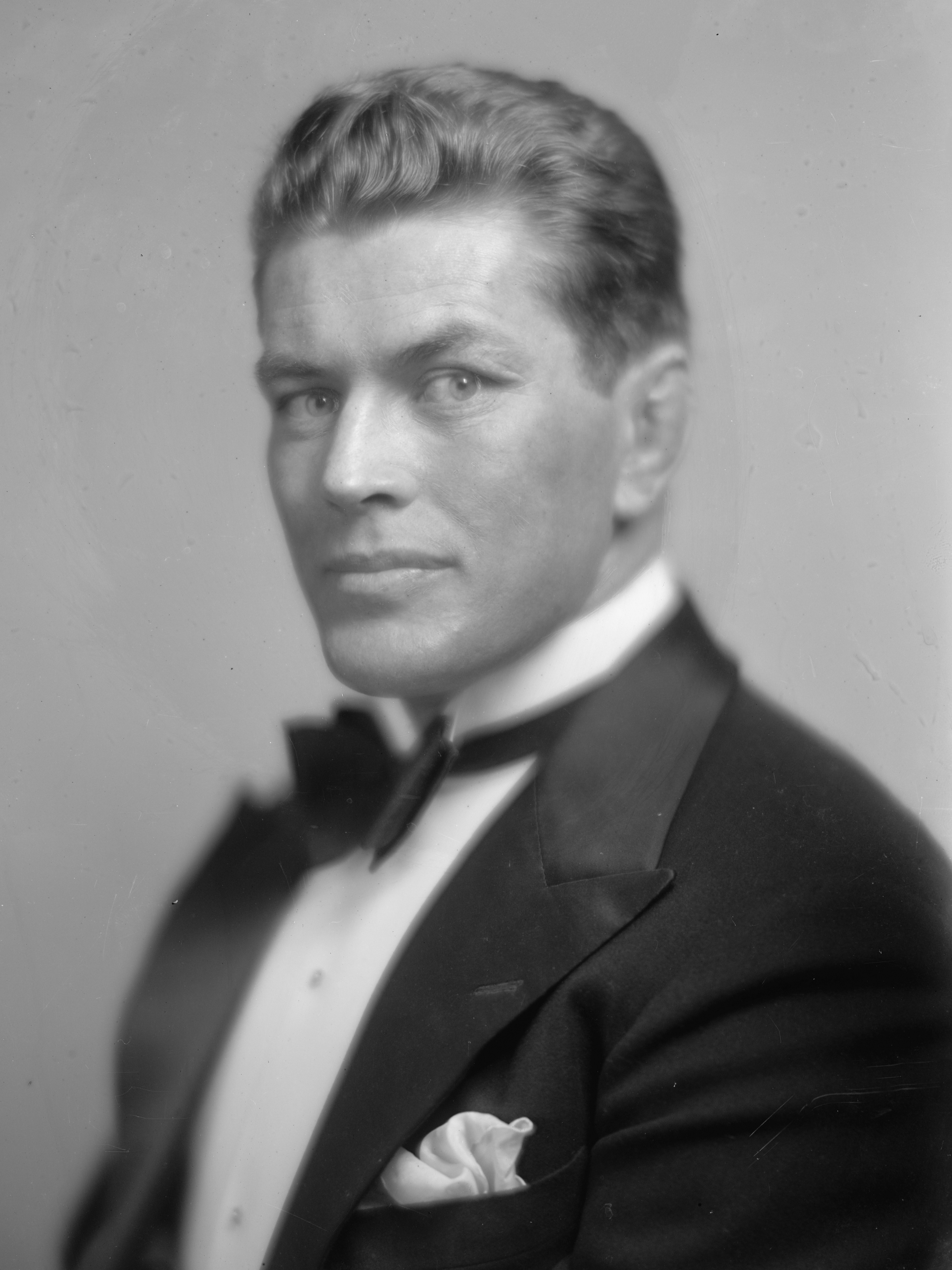
Gene Tunney

- Abe "The Little Hebrew" Attell (1883–1970), boxer, World Featherweight Champion
- Riddick "Big Daddy" Bowe (born 1967), World Heavyweight Champion
- Shannon Briggs (born 1971), boxer, World Heavyweight Champion
- Al "Bummy" Davis (1920–1945), professional boxer – Brooklyn
- Abe Goldstein (1898–1977), boxer, World Bantamweight champion
- Zab Judah (born 1977), boxer, World Welterweight and Junior Welterweight Champion Leiner; 1896–1947), boxer, World Lightweight Champion
- Solly Krieger (1909–1964), boxer, World Middleweight Champion
- Jake "Raging [Bronx] Bull" LaMotta (1922–2017), boxer, World Middleweight Champion
- Boyd Melson (born 1981), boxer, World Military Boxing Champion in the 69 kg. weight class
- Samuel Mosberg (1896–1967), boxer, Olympic light heavyweight champion
- Floyd Patterson (1935–2006), boxer, World Heavyweight Champion
- Sugar Ray Robinson (1921–1989), boxer, World Middleweight Champion
- Maxie "Slapsie Maxie" Rosenbloom (1907–1976), World Light Heavyweight Champion
- Charlie Phil Rosenberg (1902–1976), boxer, World Bantamweight Champion
- Barney Ross (born Dov-Ber "Beryl" David Rosofsky; 1909–1967), boxer, world champion in three weight divisions: lightweight, light welterweight, and welterweight
- Isadore "Corporal Izzy" Schwartz (1902–1988), boxer, World Flyweight Champion
- Al "The Bronx Beauty" Singer (1909–1961), boxer, World Lightweight Champion
- Gene Tunney (1897–1978), boxer, World Heavyweight Champion
- Mike Tyson (born 1966), former professional boxer, World Heavyweight Champion

=== Fencing ===
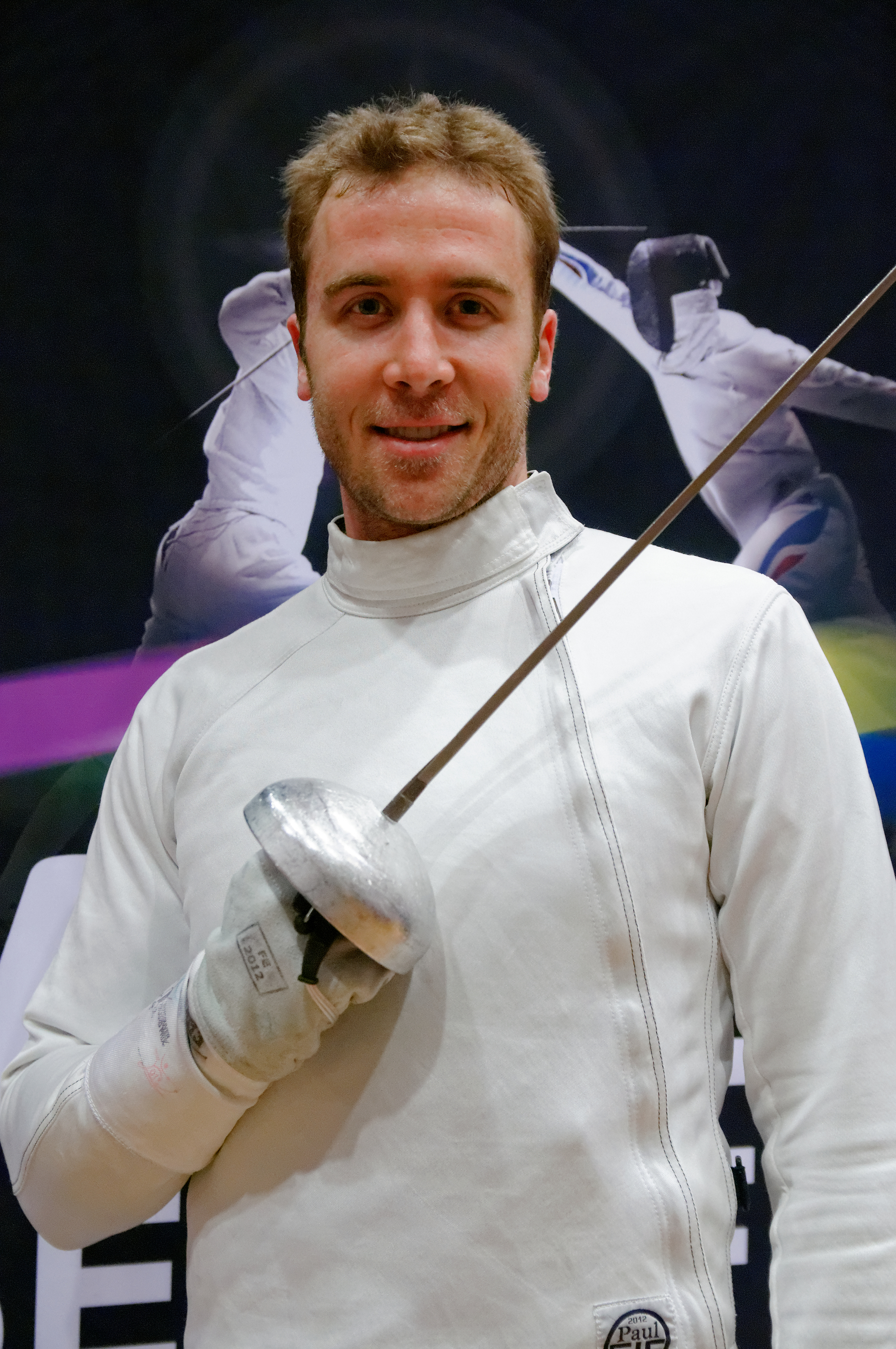
Soren Thompson

- Norman C. Armitage (born Norman Cudworth Cohn; 1907–1972), Olympic medalist saber fencer, 6x Olympian
- Albert Axelrod (1921–2004), Olympic medalist foil fencer, 5x Olympian
- Cliff Bayer (born 1977), 2x Olympic foil fencer
- Robert Blum (1928–2022), 2x Olympic saber fencer
- Daniel Bukantz (1917–2008), 4x Olympic foil fencer
- Herbert Cohen (born 1940), 2x Olympic foil fencer
- Gene Glazer (born 1939), 2x Olympic foil fencer
- Hal Goldsmith (born Hans Goldschmidt; 1930–2004), 3x Olympic foil fencer
- Ralph Goldstein (1913–1997), 2x Olympic épée fencer
- Julia Jones-Pugliese (1909–1993), national champion fencer and fencing coach
- Allan Kwartler (1917–1998), 3x Olympic sabre and foil fencer, Pan American Games and Maccabiah Games champion
- Ivan Lee (born 1981), Olympic saber fencer; banned for life
- Nate Lubell (1916–2006), 3x Olympic foil fencer
- Tim Morehouse (born 1978), Olympic medalist saber fencer, 3x Olympian
- Soren Thompson (born 1981), 2x Olympian, NCAA épée champion, world team champion

=== American football ===
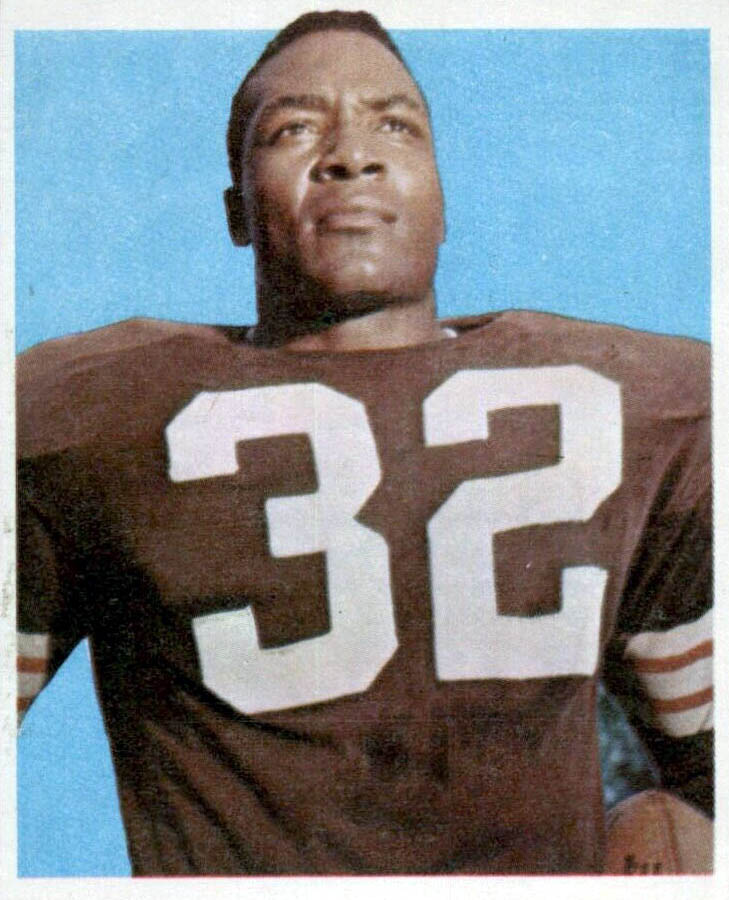
Jim Brown

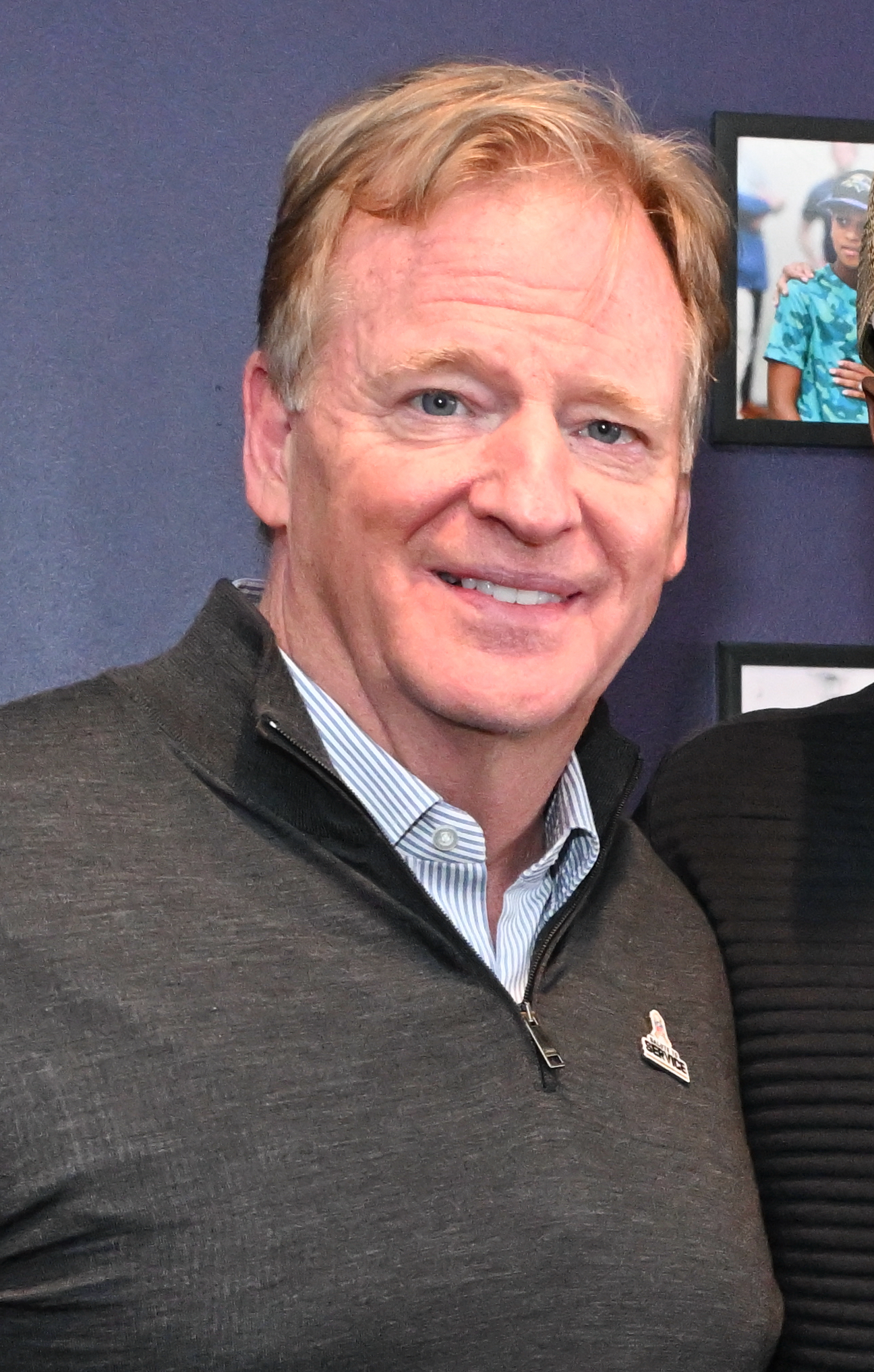
Roger Goodell

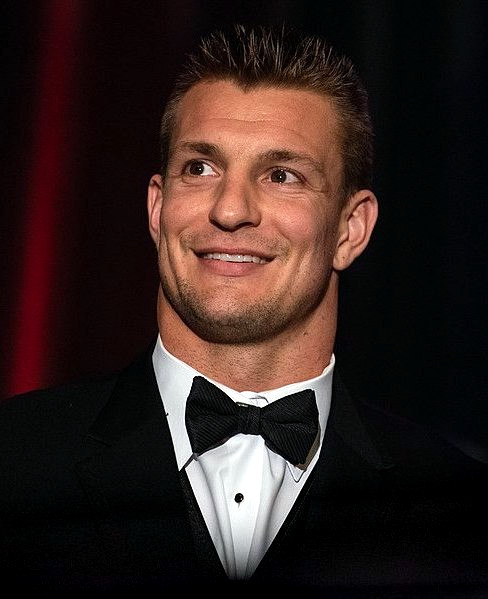
Rob Gronkowski

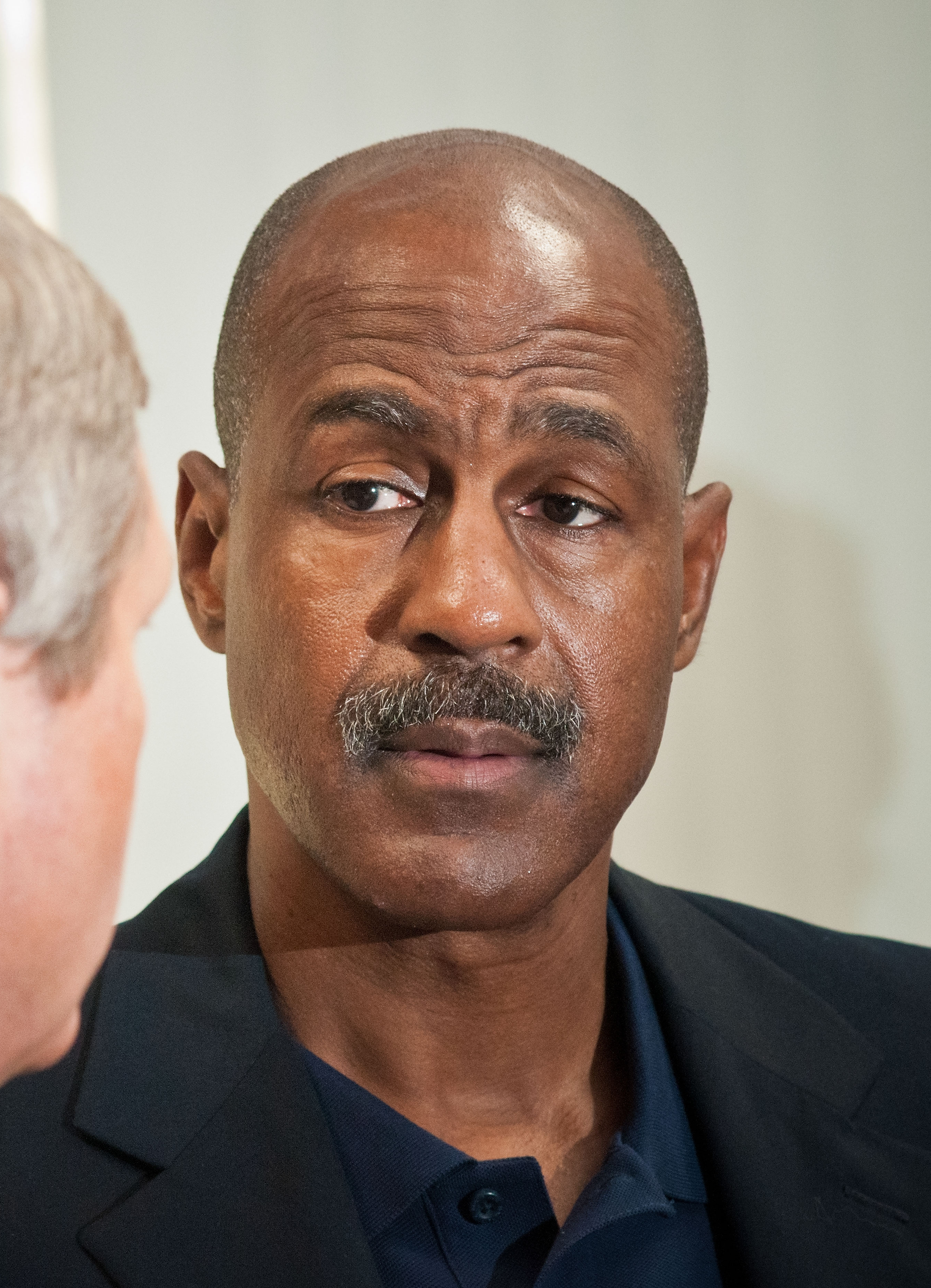
Art Monk

- Doc Alexander (1897–1975), football player and coach
- Lyle Alzado (1949–1992), football All Pro player (Denver Broncos, Los Angeles Raiders)
- Russ Brandon (born 1967), football executive
- Jim Brown (1936–2023), Hall of Fame football player (Cleveland Browns)
- Tom Coughlin (born 1946), football coach
- Jordan Dangerfield (born 1990), NFL football player
- Boomer Esiason (born 1961), former football player (Cincinnati Bengals)
- D'Brickashaw Ferguson (born 1983), NFL offensive tackle (New York Jets)
- Jay Fiedler (born 1971), NFL football quarterback
- Brian Flores (born 1981), football coach
- Roger Goodell (born 1959), NFL commissioner; born in Jamestown
- Rob Gronkowski (born 1989), former football player (New England Patriots)
- Thomas Hennessy (born 1994), football player
- Arthur Jones (born 1986), football player
- Chandler Jones (born 1990), NFL outside linebacker
- Brett Kern (born 1986), NFL punter (Tennessee Titans)
- Vince Lombardi (1913–1970), football coach
- Sid Luckman (1916–1998), football player (Chicago Bears), inducted into Hall of Fame in 1965
- John Mackey (1941–2011), football player (Baltimore Colts), inducted into Hall of Fame in 1992
- Ali Marpet (born 1993), football player (Tampa Bay Buccaneers)
- Doug Marrone (born 1964), football coach
- Josh Miller (born 1970), football player and football analyst
- Art Monk (born 1957), former football player (Washington Redskins), inducted into Hall of Fame in 2008
- Ed Newman (born 1951), All-Pro football player
- Joe Paterno (1926–2012), football coach
- Matt Patricia (born 1974), football coach
- Adam Podlesh (born 1983), football player
- Ray Rice (born 1987), former football player (Baltimore Ravens)
- Herb Rich (1928–2008), 2x All-Pro football player
- Aaron "Rosy" Rosenberg (1912–1979), 2x All-American college football player, and film and television producer
- Allie Sherman (1923–2015), National Football League player and head coach
- Will Smith (1981–2016), football player (New Orleans Saints) – Queens
- Alan Veingrad (born 1963), NFL football player
- Pop Warner (1871–1954), football coach

=== Ice hockey ===
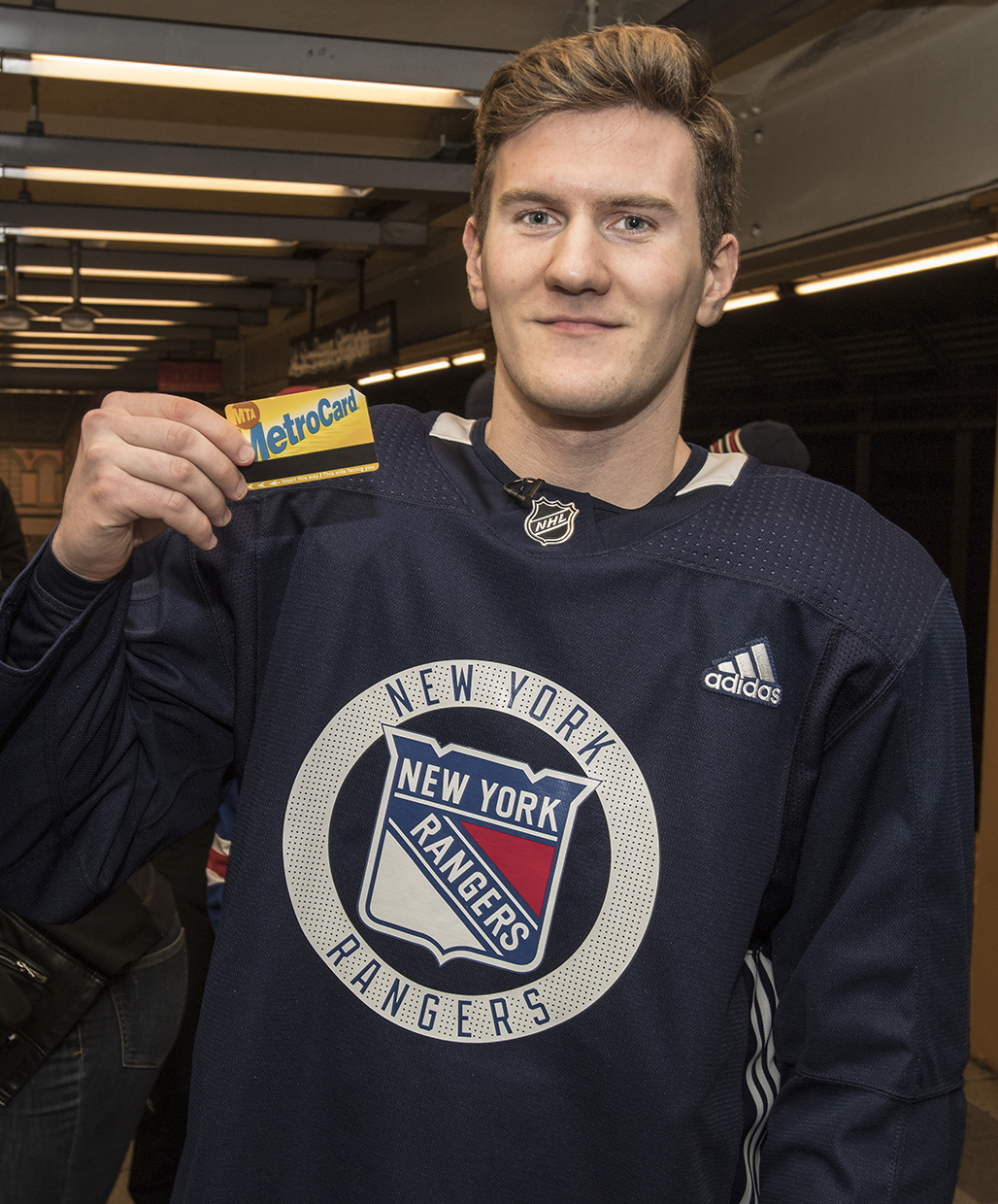
Adam Fox

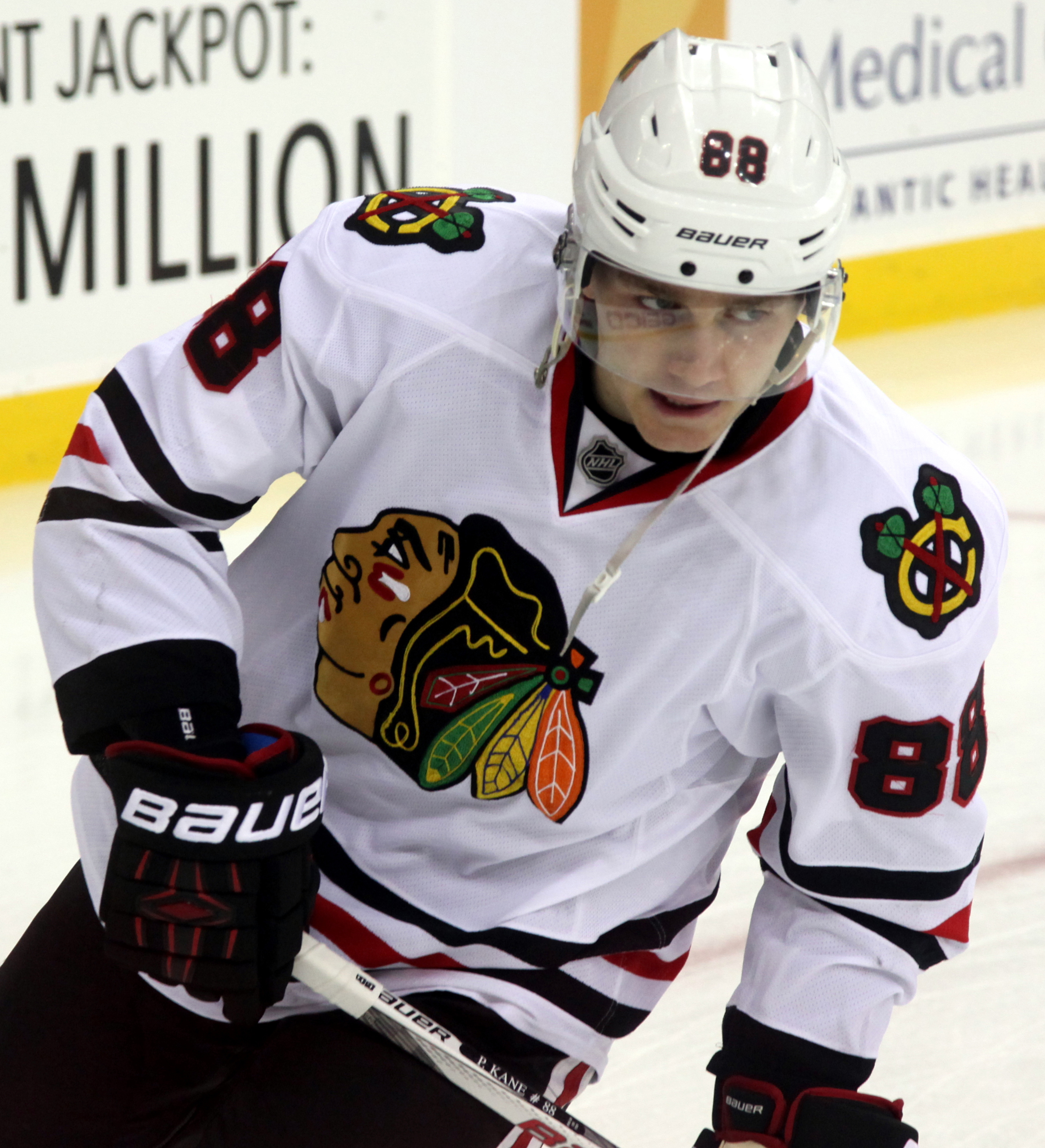
Patrick Kane

- Gary Bettman (born 1952), NHL commissioner
- Dustin Brown (born 1984), NHL ice hockey player (Los Angeles Kings) – Ithaca
- Ryan Callahan (born 1985), NHL ice hockey player (New York Rangers) – Rochester
- Tim Erixon (born 1991), American-born Swedish ice hockey player – Port Chester
- Joel Farabee (born 2000), NHL ice hockey player (Philadelphia Flyers) – Cicero
- Adam Fox (born 1998), NHL ice hockey defenseman (New York Rangers) – Jericho
- Brian Gionta (born 1979), NHL ice hockey player (Buffalo Sabres) – Rochester
- Patrick Kane (born 1988), NHL ice hockey player (Chicago Blackhawks) – Buffalo
- Seymour H. Knox III (1926–1996), co-founder of the Buffalo Sabres
- Alex "Mine Boy" Levinsky (1910–1990), American-born Canadian NHL player – Syracuse
- Eric Nystrom (born 1983), NHL ice hockey player
- Marty Reasoner (born 1977), NHL ice hockey player – Honeoye Falls
- Mathieu Schneider (born 1969), NHL ice hockey player

=== Soccer ===
- Jordan Cila (born 1982), Major League Soccer midfielder
- Benny Feilhaber (born 1985), soccer midfielder
- Shep Messing (born 1949), Olympic soccer goalkeeper and current broadcaster
- Charlie Reiter (born 1988), soccer player
- Timothy Weah (born 2000), professional soccer player in Ligue 1 and member of the United States men's national soccer team
- Sara Whalen (born 1976), Olympic soccer player

=== Swimming ===
- Ryan Lochte (born 1984), competitive swimmer, gold medalist at the 2004, 2008, 2012, and 2016 Summer Olympics, and contestant on Dancing with the Stars season 23 – Rochester
- Lia Neal (born 1995), competitive swimmer, silver and bronze Olympic medalist – Brooklyn
- Ashley Twichell (born 1989), Olympic swimmer – Fayetteville

=== Tennis ===
- Marilyn Aschner (born 1948), tennis player
- Irvin Dorfman (1924–2006), tennis player
- Herbert Flam (1928–1980), tennis player
- Jim Grabb (born 1964), tennis player
- Jim Gurfein (born 1961), tennis player
- Ladislav Hecht (1909–2004), tennis player
- Scott Lipsky (born 1981), tennis player
- Jamie Loeb (born 1995), tennis player
- Bruce Manson (born 1956), tennis player
- John McEnroe (born 1959), tennis player
- Larry Nagler (born 1940), tennis player
- Renée Richards (born 1934), tennis player
- Noah Rubin (born 1996), tennis player
- Ed Rubinoff (born 1935), tennis player
- Julius Seligson (1909–1987), tennis player
- Bill Tilden (1893–1953), tennis player

=== Track and field ===
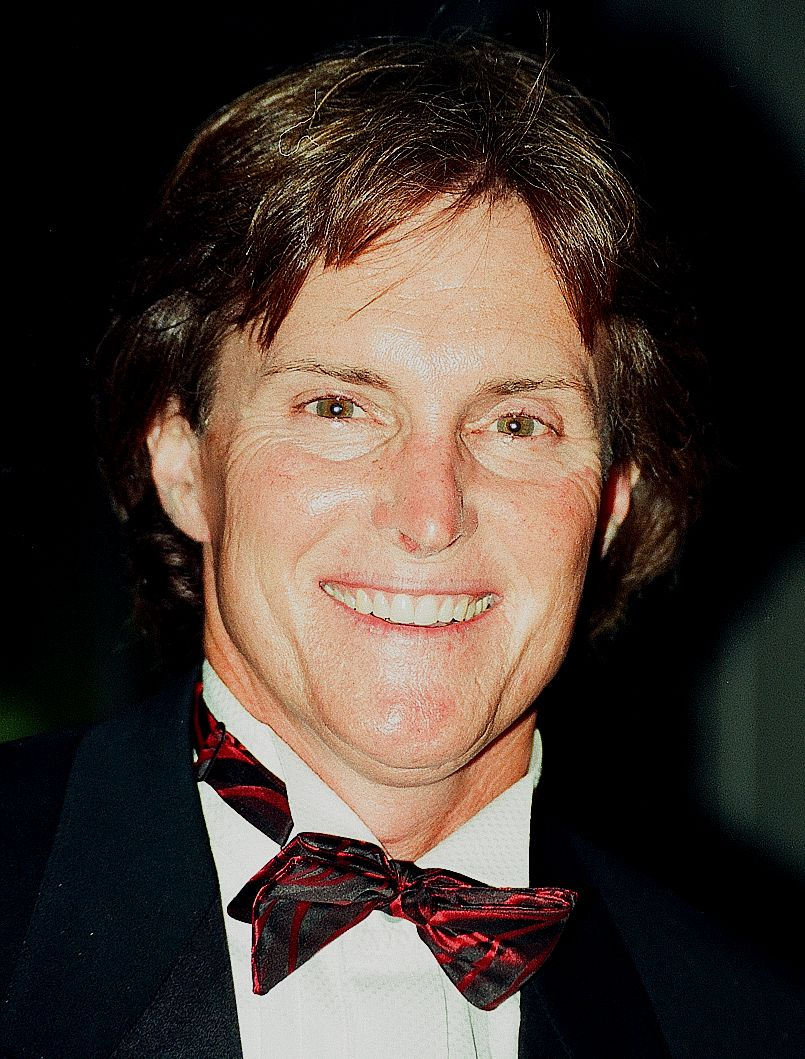
Caitlyn Jenner

- Andy Bloom (born 1973), Olympic shot putter
- Lillian Copeland (1904–1964), Olympic discus champion; set world records in discus, javelin, and shot put
- Caitlyn Jenner (formerly Bruce Jenner) (born 1949), retired decathlete, gold medalist at the 1976 Montreal Olympics, and television personality
- Judy Shapiro-Ikenberry (born 1942), long-distance runner

=== Other sports ===
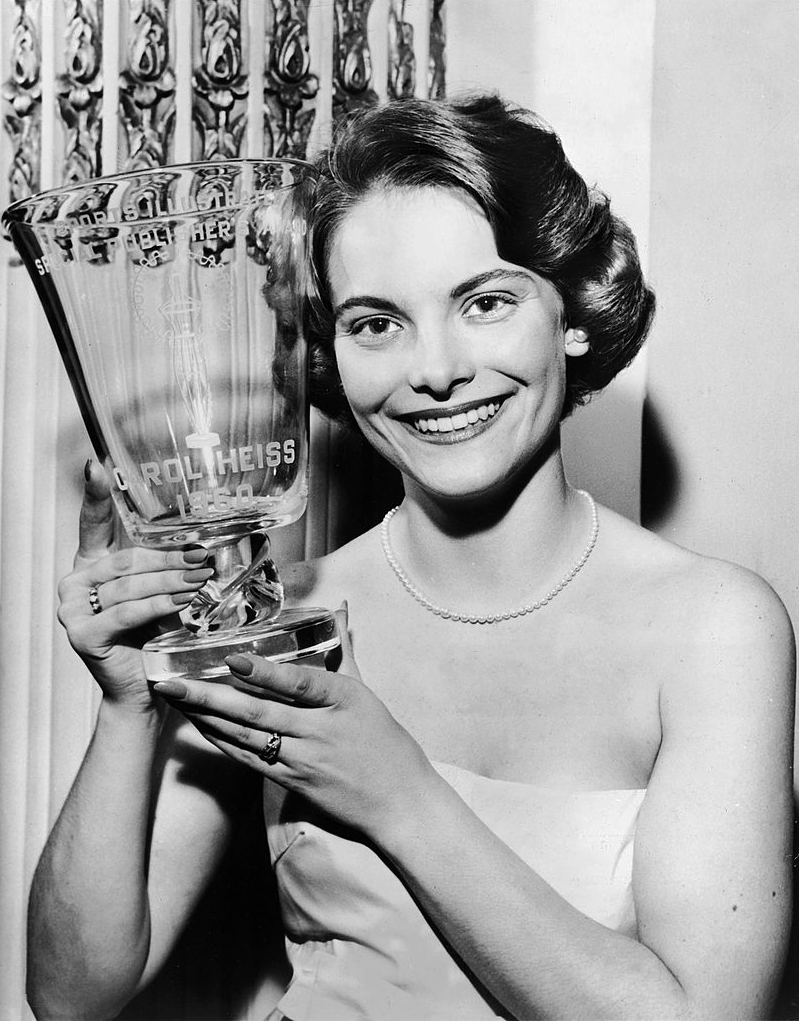
Carol Heiss

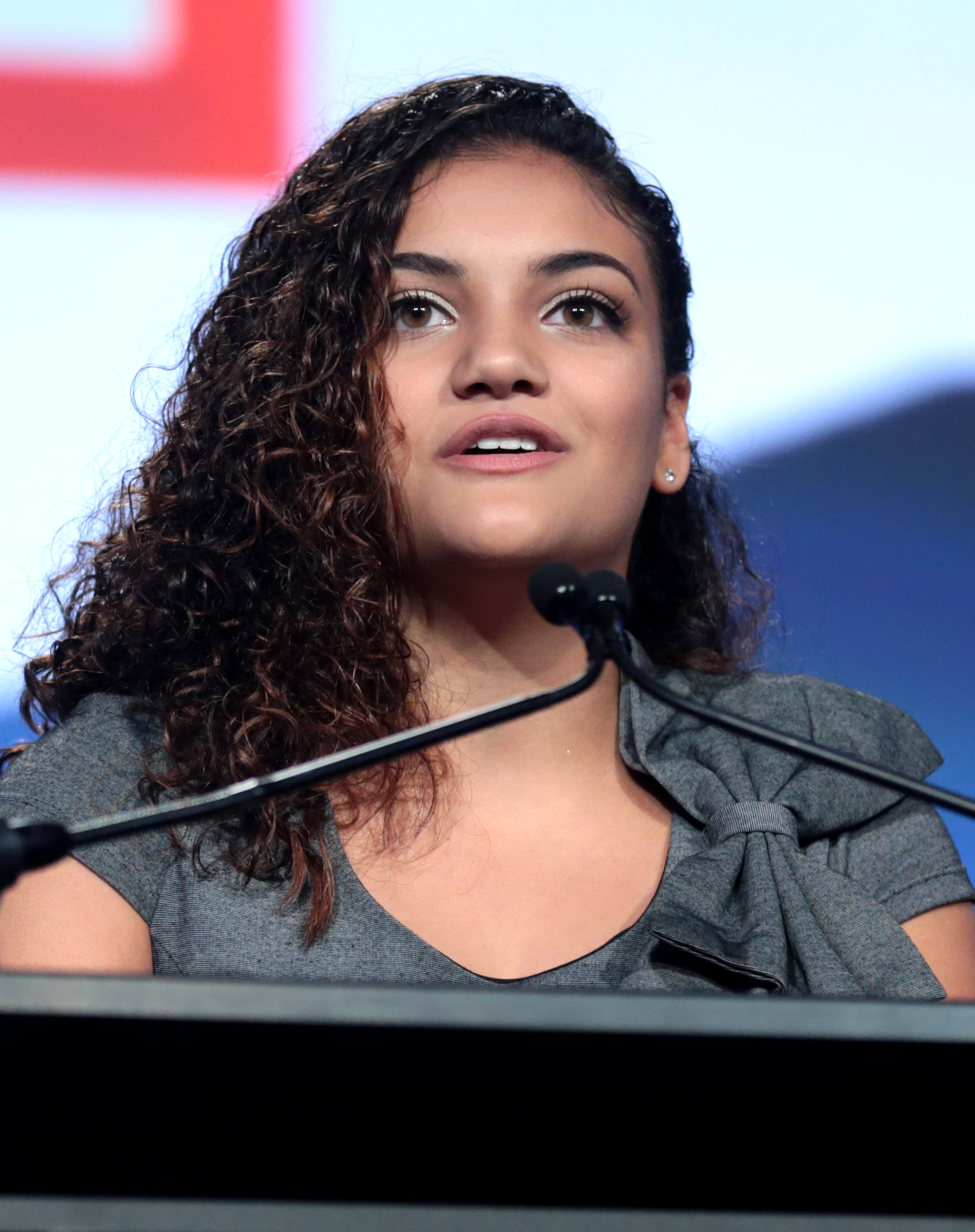
Laurie Hernandez

- Charles Ackerly (1898–1982), Olympic gold medalist in freestyle wrestling
- Carl Adams (born 1950), two-time NCAA wrestling champion, coach, and businessman
- Ed Banach (born 1960), Olympic gold medalist in freestyle wrestling
- Lou Banach (born 1960), Olympic gold medalist in freestyle wrestling
- Herman Barron (1909–1978), professional golfer
- Jeff Blatnick (1957–2012), Olympic gold medalist in Greco-Roman wrestling
- Benjamin Bradshaw (1879–1960), Olympic gold medalist in freestyle wrestling
- Kareem Campbell (born 1973) professional skateboarder
- Glenn Cowan (1952–2004), table tennis player
- Robert Curry (1882–1944), Olympic gold medalist in freestyle wrestling
- Kyle Dake (born 1991), Olympic freestyle wrestler, four-time World Champion, and four-time NCAA wrestling champion in four different weight classes
- Yianni Diakomihalis (born 1999), four-time NCAA wrestling champion, World medalist in freestyle wrestling
- Tommy Dreamer (born 1971), professional wrestler (Yonkers)
- Jim Drucker (born 1952/1953), former Commissioner of the Continental Basketball Association, former Commissioner of the Arena Football League, and founder of NewKadia Comics
- Mick Foley (born 1965), professional wrestler and author
- Danielle Goldstein (born 1985), American-Israeli show jumper
- Nick Gwiazdowski (born 1992), two-time NCAA wrestling champion and two-time World medalist in freestyle wrestling
- Carol Heiss (born 1940), figure skater, 1960 Olympic champion, five-time World Champion
- Laurie Hernandez (born 2000), artistic gymnast, gold medalist at the 2016 Rio Olympics, and winner of Dancing with the Stars season 23
- Jon Jones (born 1987), UFC light heavyweight champion
- Kristie Marano (born 1979), two-time World champion and nine-time World medalist in women's freestyle wrestling
- Colette Nelson (born 1974), professional bodybuilder
- Troy Nickerson (born 1987), NCAA wrestling champion, collegiate wrestling head coach
- Isidor Niflot (1881–1950), Olympic gold medalist in freestyle wrestling
- Beth Phoenix (born 1980), professional wrestler – Elmira
- Damian Priest (born 1982), professional wrestler – New York City
- Otto Roehm (1882–1958), Olympic gold medalist in freestyle wrestling
- Aljamain Sterling (born 1989), UFC Champion
- Chris Weidman (born 1984), former UFC Middleweight Champion
- Zelina Vega (born 1990), professional wrestler
- Claire Weinstein (born 2007), Olympic silver medalist freestyle swimmer

== Business ==
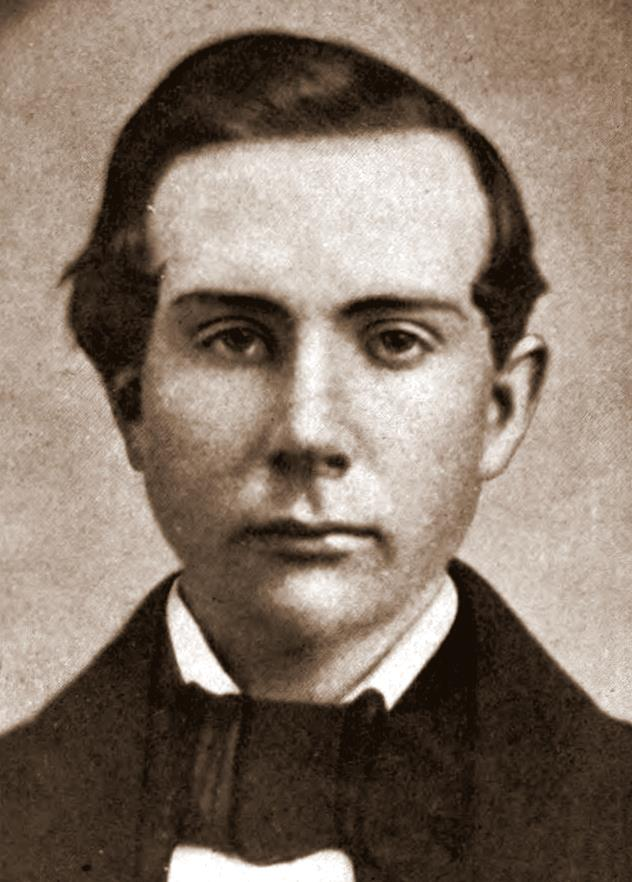
John D. Rockefeller

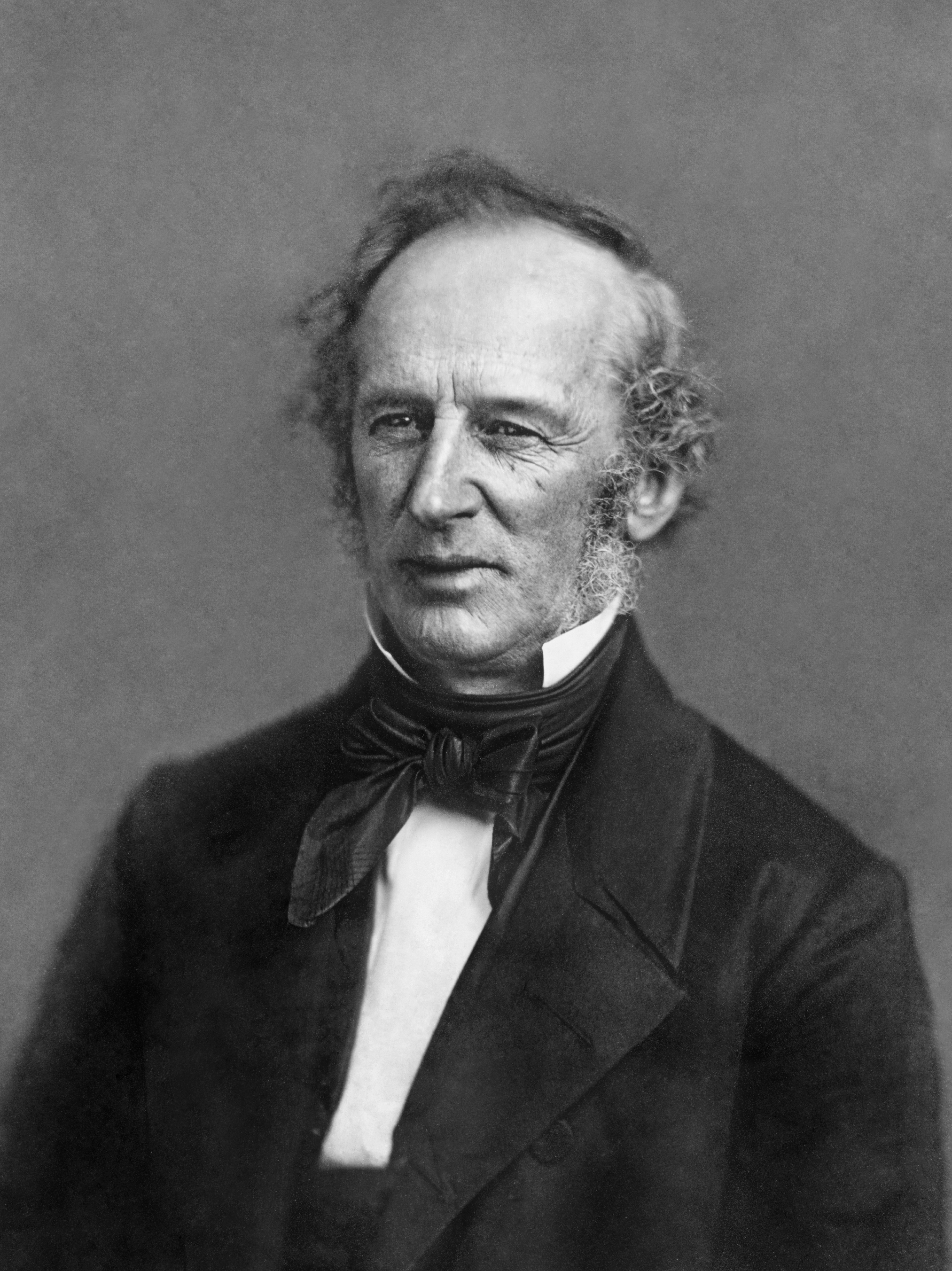
Cornelius Vanderbilt

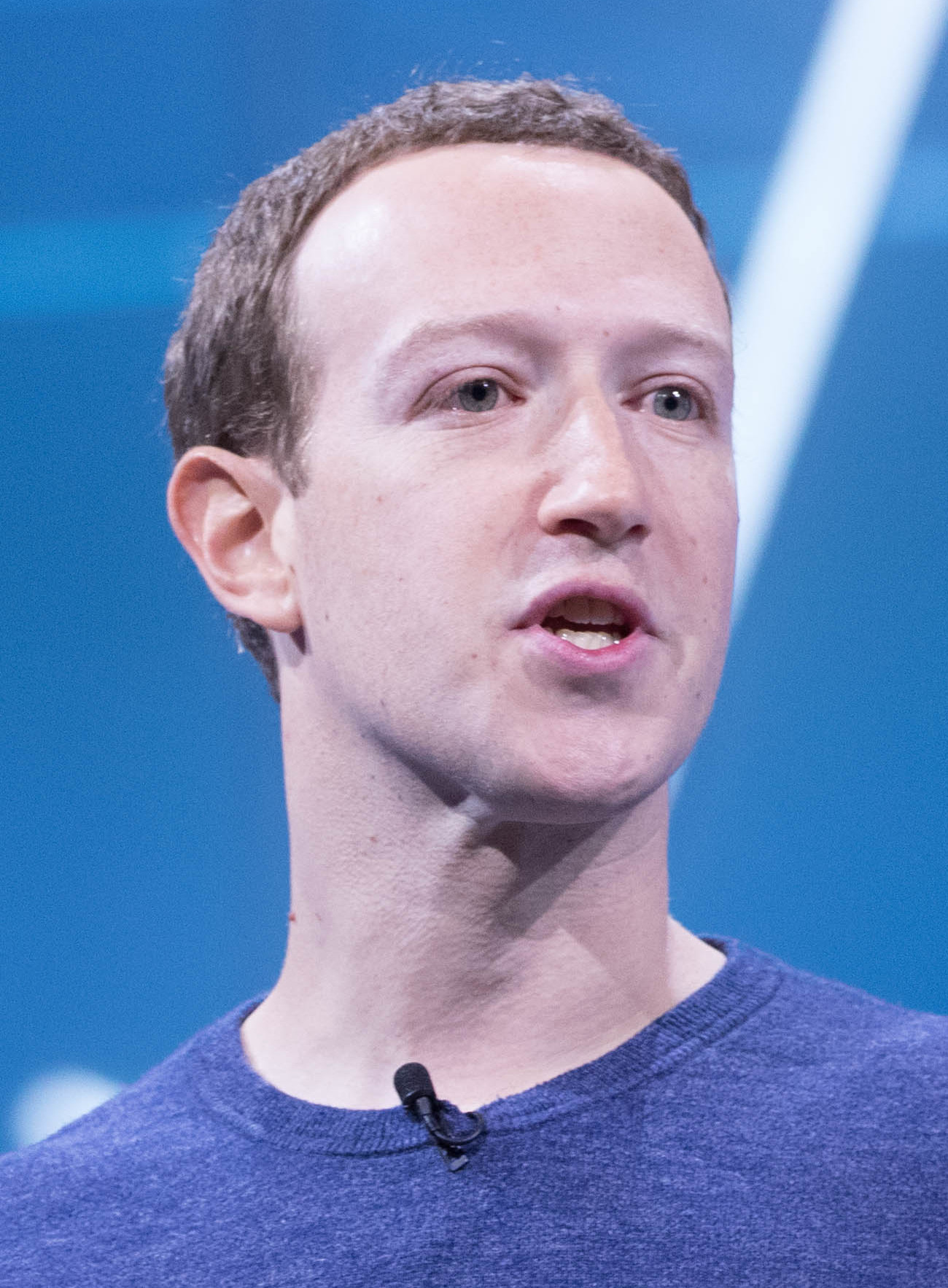
Mark Zuckerberg

- John Jacob Astor (1763–1848), fur trader and company founder
- Nicholas F. Brady, former CEO of Dillon Read and 68th United States Secretary of the Treasury
- Helen Gilman Noyes Brown, philanthropist, clubwoman
- Dimies T. Stocking Denison (1852–1940), businesswoman, philanthropist and clubwoman
- C. Douglas Dillon (1909–2003), CEO of Dillon Read, United States ambassador to France (1953–1957), and 57th United States Secretary of the Treasury
- George Eastman (1854–1932), founder of Eastman Kodak
- Joseph Ellicott (1760–1826), surveyor and city planner
- William Fargo (1818–1881), co-founder of American Express Company and Wells Fargo; Mayor of Buffalo
- Reggie Fils-Aimé (born 1961), president and chief operating officer of Nintendo of America
- Debra Fox, founder of Fox Learning Systems
- Alexander Snow Gordon (died 1803), silversmith
- Scott Greenstein (born 1959), president and chief content officer of Sirius XM Satellite Radio
- E. H. Harriman, errand boy, broker, railroader
- George A. Hormel (1860–1946), founder of Hormel
- Jeremy Jacobs (born 1940), owner of Delaware North and Boston Bruins
- John J. Kennedy (1857–1914), financier and 45th New York state treasurer
- Harriette A. Keyser (1841–1936), industrial reformer
- Seymour H. Knox I (1861–1915), businessman and co-founder of F. W. Woolworth Company
- Seymour H. Knox II (1898–1990), philanthropist and former director of Marine Midland Bank
- Reginald Lenna, CEO and philanthropist
- Jon L. Luther, food service executive
- Sherman J. Maisel (1918–2010), economist
- Jeremiah Milbank, banker, co-founder of Borden Milk Co. (1857)
- Victor Niederhoffer (1943– 2026), hedge fund manager, U.S. Squash Champion and Paddleball Champion, bestselling author, and statistician.
- Jacquelyn Ottman, marketing consultant
- Henry Paulson (born 1946), former CEO of Goldman Sachs and United States Secretary of the Treasury
- Nelson Peltz (born 1942), billionaire businessman and investor
- Joseph R. Perella, financier
- Jeffry Picower (1942–2009), investor and noted philanthropist involved in the Madoff investment scandal
- Pat Powers (1870–1948), movie producer
- Donald Regan (1918–2003), CEO of Merrill Lynch and 66th United States Secretary of the Treasury
- Robert E. Rich Sr. (1913–2006), inventor and foodservice executive
- David Rockefeller (1915–2017), banker
- John D. Rockefeller (1839–1937), philanthropist and founder of Standard Oil
- John D. Rockefeller Jr., philanthropist and financier
- William Rockefeller (1841–1941), co-founder of Standard Oil
- Alan Rosen (born 1969), restaurant and bakery owner, and author
- Jeffrey Rosen, billionaire businessman
- Robert Rubin (born 1938), former CEO of Goldman Sachs and 70th United States Secretary of the Treasury
- Scott Rudin, movie producer
- Frank Russek (1875/1876–1948), Polish-born American co-founder of the Russeks department store chain
- Jacob Schiff, Wall Street executive and banker
- Edward Selzer (1893–1970), movie producer
- Ellsworth Milton Statler (1863–1928), hotelier
- Stuart Sternberg (born 1959), owner of the Tampa Bay Rays
- Jill Stuart (born 1965), fashion designer
- Whitney Tilson (born 1966), hedge fund manager, philanthropist, author, and Democratic political activist
- Donald Trump Jr. (born 1977), businessman; eldest son of Donald Trump and brother of Eric, Ivanka, and Tiffany
- Eric Trump (born 1984), philanthropist and businessman; son of Donald Trump and brother of Ivanka, Tiffany, and Donald Jr.
- Ivanka Trump (born 1981), businesswoman, writer, and former fashion model; daughter of Donald Trump and sister of Eric, Donald Jr., and Tiffany
- Tiffany Trump (born 1993), daughter of Donald Trump and sister of Ivanka, Eric, and Donald Jr.
- Cornelius Vanderbilt (1794–1877), ferry and tugboat captain, company founder, and railroader
- Sanford Weill (born 1933), former CEO of Citigroup
- Henry Wells (1805–1878), businessman
- Bob Weinstein (born 1954), movie producer and co-founder of Miramax Films and The Weinstein Company
- Harvey Weinstein (born 1952), movie producer and co-founder of Miramax Films and the Weinstein Company
- John G. Wickser (1858–1928), businessman and New York state treasurer (1903–1904)
- Robert G. Wilmers (1934–2017), CEO of M&T Bank
- Christopher Woodrow (born 1977), movie producer and founder of Worldview Entertainment and MCT
- Mark Zuckerberg (born 1984), founder and CEO of Facebook

== Fashion, beauty, and modeling ==
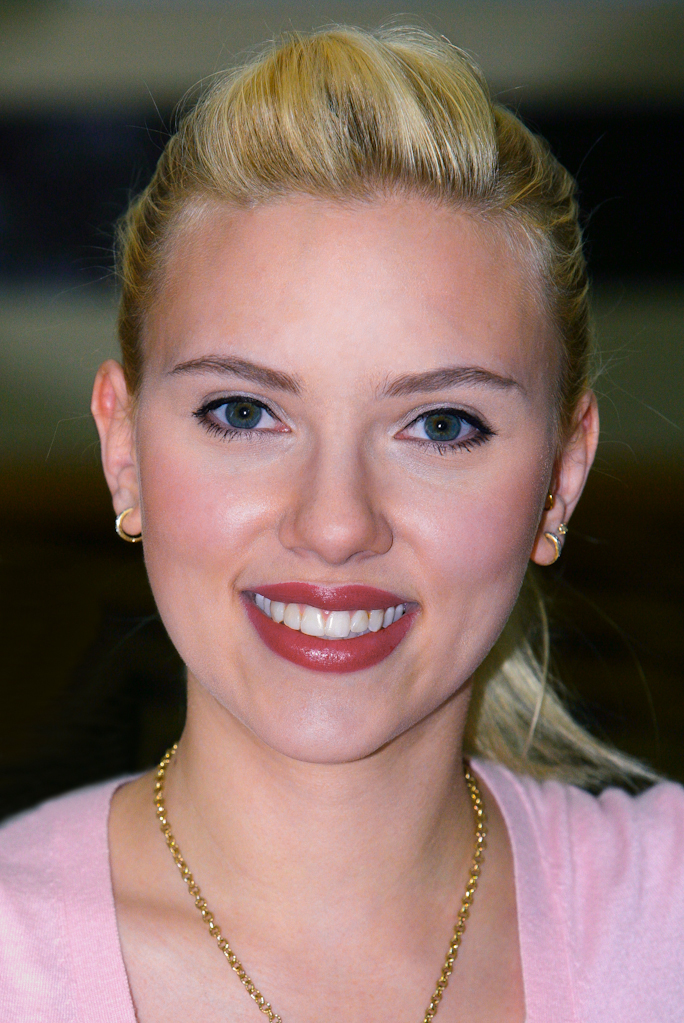
Scarlett Johansson

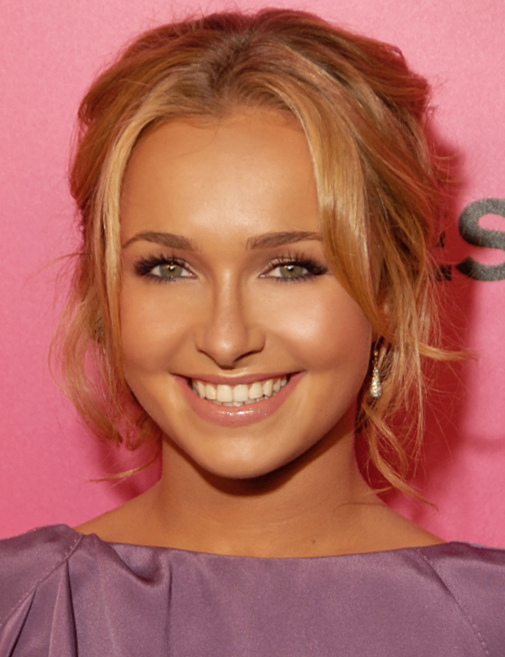
Hayden Panettiere

- Keith Carlos (born 1987), fashion model, former football player, and winner of America's Next Top Model season 21
- Nyle DiMarco (born 1989), model, actor, deaf activist, and winner of Dancing with the Stars season 22 and America's Next Top Model season 22
- Barbie Ferreira (born 1996), actress and model
- Tom Ford (born 1961), fashion designer, film director, screenwriter, and film producer
- Mary Therese Friel (born 1960), beauty queen, model, businesswoman, and winner of Miss USA 1979
- Marc Jacobs (born 1963), fashion designer and former creative director of Louis Vuitton (1997–2014)
- Scarlett Johansson (born 1984), actress, model, and singer
- Calvin Klein (born 1942), fashion designer and founder of Calvin Klein Inc
- Michael Kors (born 1959), sportswear fashion designer; founder and CEO of Michael Kors Holdings
- Ralph Lauren (born 1939), fashion designer, philanthropist, business executive, and founder of the Ralph Lauren Corporation
- Stacy London (born 1969), stylist, fashion consultant
- Jackie Loughery (1930–2024), actress, beauty queen, and inaugural winner of Miss USA
- Erica Mena (born 1987), model and television personality
- Sienna Miller (born 1981), actress, model, and fashion designer
- Sarah Natochenny (born 1987), actress, film editor, fashion model, and voice actress
- Rachel Nichols (born 1980), actress and model
- Hayden Panettiere (born 1989), actress, model, singer, and activist
- Kimberly Pressler (born 1977), model, reality television star, and first runner-up at Miss USA 1995
- Tanya Roberts (1955–2020), actress, model
- Alexis Skyy (born 1994), model and television personality
- Carmen Marc Valvo (born 1953), evening-wear and high-end cocktail dress designer

== Lawyers and jurists ==
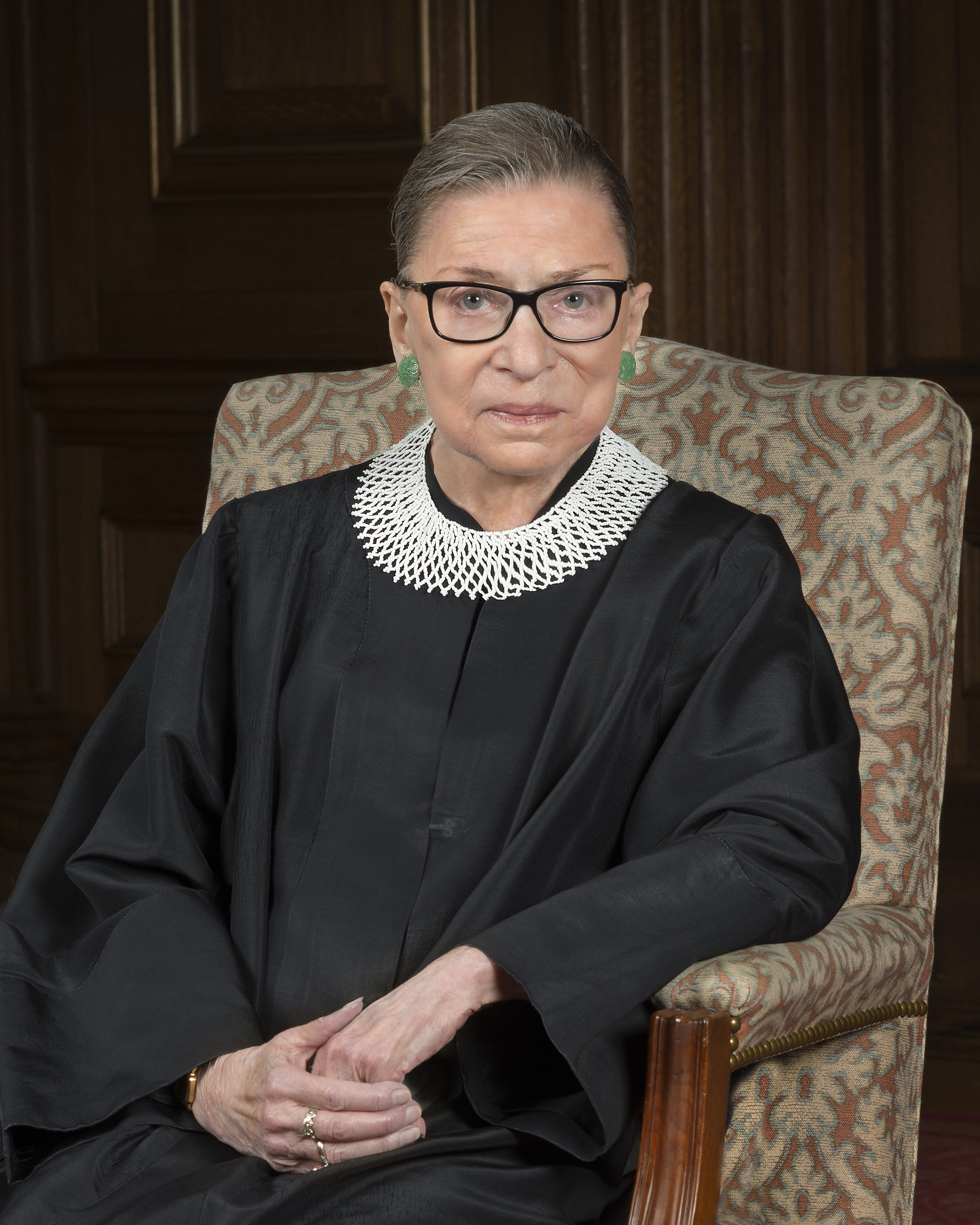
Ruth Bader Ginsburg

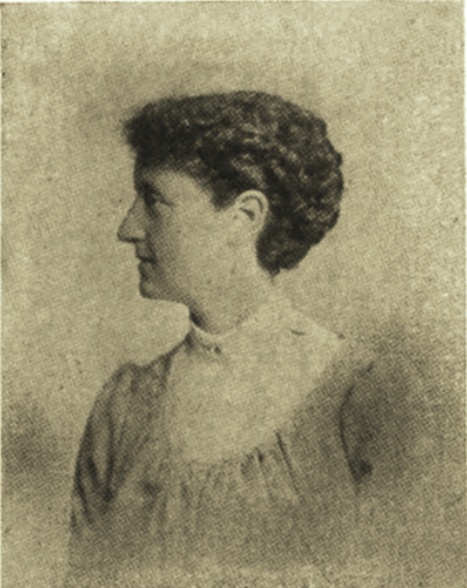
Edith Julia Griswold

- Nicholas Allard (born 1952), dean and president of Brooklyn Law School
- Benjamin N. Cardozo (1870–1938), associate justice of the Supreme Court of the United States
- Alan Dershowitz (born 1938), Harvard Law School professor and scholar of United States constitutional law and criminal law
- Linda Fairstein (born 1947), prosecutor and author
- Gerrit Forbes (1836–1906), justice of the Supreme Court of New York
- Felix Frankfurter (1882–1965), associate justice of the Supreme Court of the United States
- Henry Friendly (1903–1986), judge on the United States Court of Appeals for the Second Circuit
- Kumiki Gibson, lawyer
- Ruth Bader Ginsburg (1933–2020), associate justice of the Supreme Court of the United States
- Arthur Goldberg (1908–1990), United States Secretary of Labor, associate justice of the Supreme Court of the United States, and United States ambassador to the United Nations
- Edith Julia Griswold (1863–1926), in her day, the only female patent expert
- Alvin Hellerstein (1933–2026), United States federal judge
- John Jay (1745–1829), first chief justice of the United States
- Elena Kagan (born 1960), associate justice of the Supreme Court of the United States
- A. Leo Levin (1919–2015), law professor at the University of Pennsylvania Law School
- John Roberts (born 1955), chief justice of the United States
- Antonin Scalia (1936–2016), associate justice of the Supreme Court of the United States
- Sonia Sotomayor (born 1954), associate justice of the Supreme Court of the United States
- Amy Wax (born 1953), Robert Mundheim Professor of Law at the University of Pennsylvania Law School

== Religious leaders ==
- Marilla Baker Ingalls (1828–1902), missionary to Burma for 51 years
- Ella May Bennett (1855–1932), American Universalist minister; first woman to be ordained to the ministry on Long Island
- Mary E. Norton (1833–1916), Congregational minister and home missionary worker
- Avraham Qanaï, leader of one of the first Karaite Jewish congregations in the United States
- Emanuel Rackman (1910–2008), Modern Orthodox rabbi; president of Bar-Ilan University
- Menachem Mendel Schneerson (1902–1994), Orthodox Jewish rabbi

== Science and medicine ==
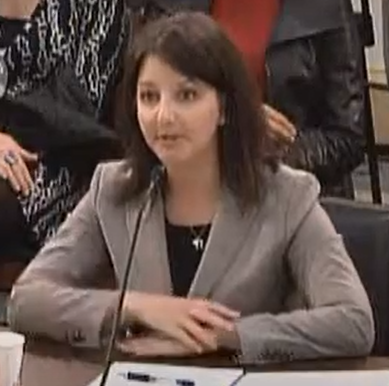
Mandy Cohen

Richard Feynman

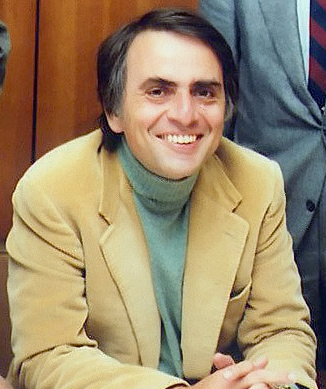
Carl Sagan

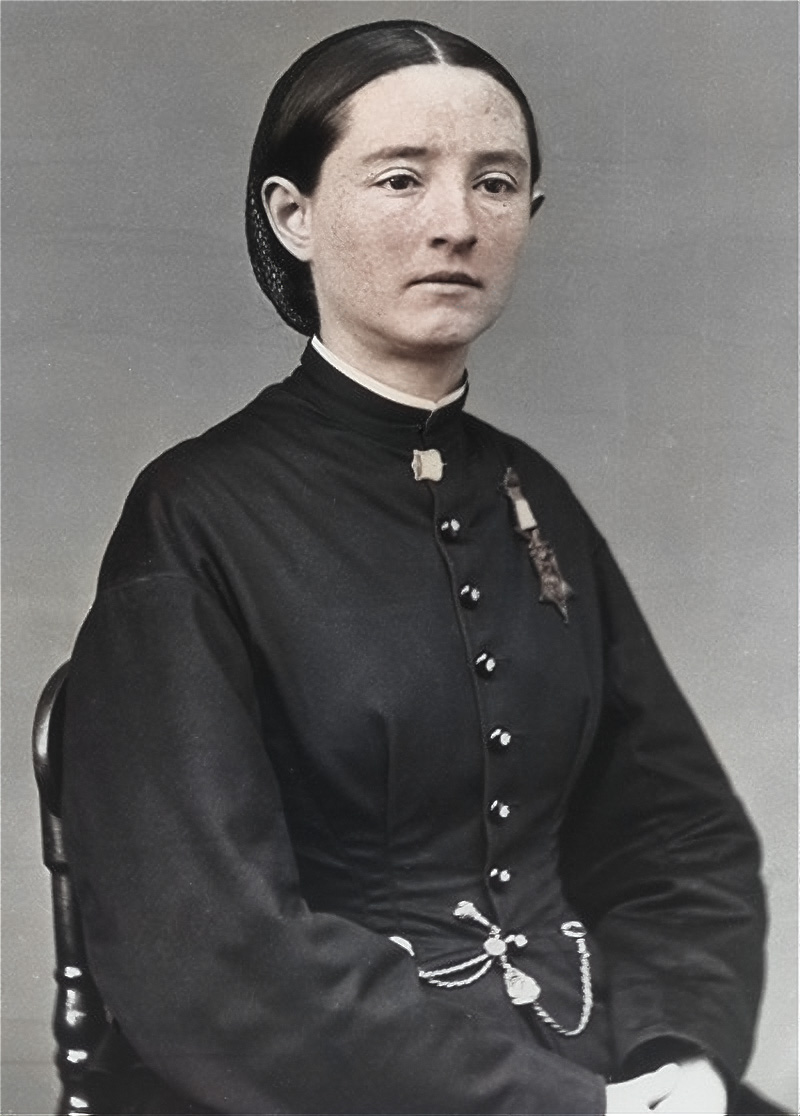
Mary Edwards Walker

- Richard Axel (born 1946), scientist and Nobel Prize winner
- Cora Belle Brewster (1859–1937), physician, surgeon, medical writer, editor
- Flora A. Brewster (1852–1919), physician, surgeon, editor
- Mandy Cohen, physician and Director of the U.S. Centers for Disease Control and Prevention
- Anna Manning Comfort (1845–1931), physician
- Mary Gage Day (1857–1935), physician, medical writer
- Gertrude B. Elion (1918–1999), biochemist, pharmacologist and Nobel Prize winner
- Richard P. Feynman (1918–1988), physicist and Nobel prize winner
- Ruth A. Gerry (1828–1876) – suffragist, 19th-century female physician, lobbied University of Michigan to admit female medical students.
- Murray Gerstenhaber (1927–2024), mathematician and lawyer
- Carl Sagan (1934–1996), astronomer
- Jonas Salk (1914–1995), scientist, developed first polio vaccine
- George Herman Babcock (1832–1893), inventor
- William Martin Beauchamp, ethnologist and clergyman – Orange County
- Dr. Elizabeth Blackwell, abolitionist, women's rights activist, first female doctor in the United States, studied medicine at Geneva College
- Willis Carrier, inventor
- Cornelius Cooper, African-American physician, famous for his lawsuit to separate from the U.S. Army as an objector to the war while attending West Point Military Academy
- Asa Fitch of Salem, first occupational entomologist in the United States; first professional wntomologist of New York State Agricultural Society, commissioned by the State of New York
- Dr. George Franklin Grant, first African-American professor at Harvard; dentist; inventor of the golf tee – Oswego
- James Hall
- Joseph Henry, scientist who advanced the understanding of electricity, and who served as the first Secretary of the Smithsonian Institution
- Franklin B. Hough
- Irving Langmuir, chemist and physicist, Nobel laureate – Schenectady
- Eben Jenks Loomis, astronomer – Oppenheim
- Lewis Henry Morgan, ethnologist, anthropologist, writer, and attorney – Aurora and Rochester
- Roger Tory Peterson, naturalist, ornithologist, writer, and educator – Jamestown
- Henry Rowe Schoolcraft, geographer, geologist, and ethnologist – Guilderland
- Edward Livingston Trudeau, established the Adirondack Cottage Sanitarium at Saranac Lake for treatment of tuberculosis
- Charles Doolittle Walcott, paleontologist
- Mary Edwards Walker, feminist, abolitionist, prohibitionist, suffragist, alleged spy, prisoner of war, surgeon; only woman to receive the Medal of Honor – Oswego
- Henry Augustus Ward

== Foreign-born New Yorkers ==
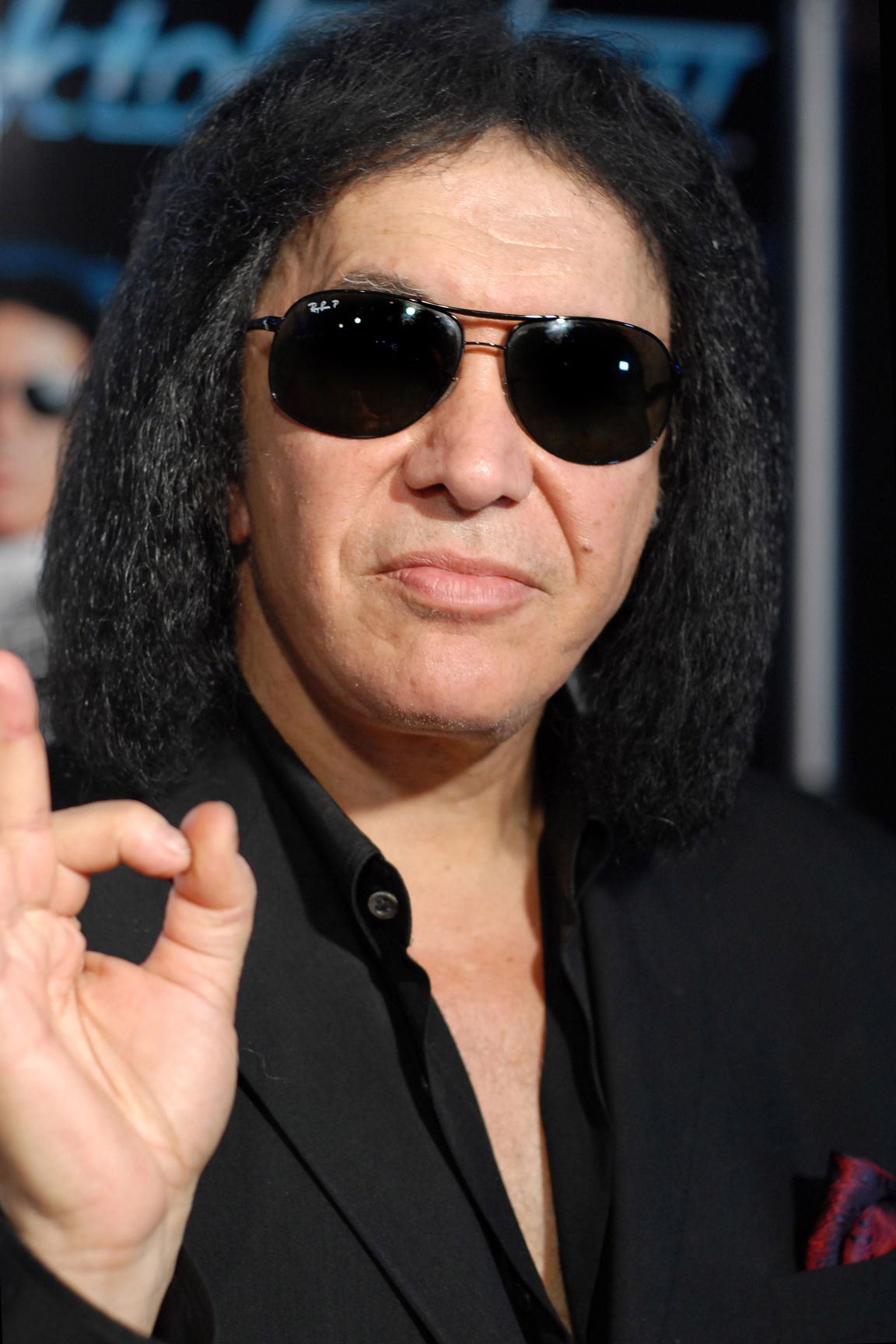
Gene Simmons

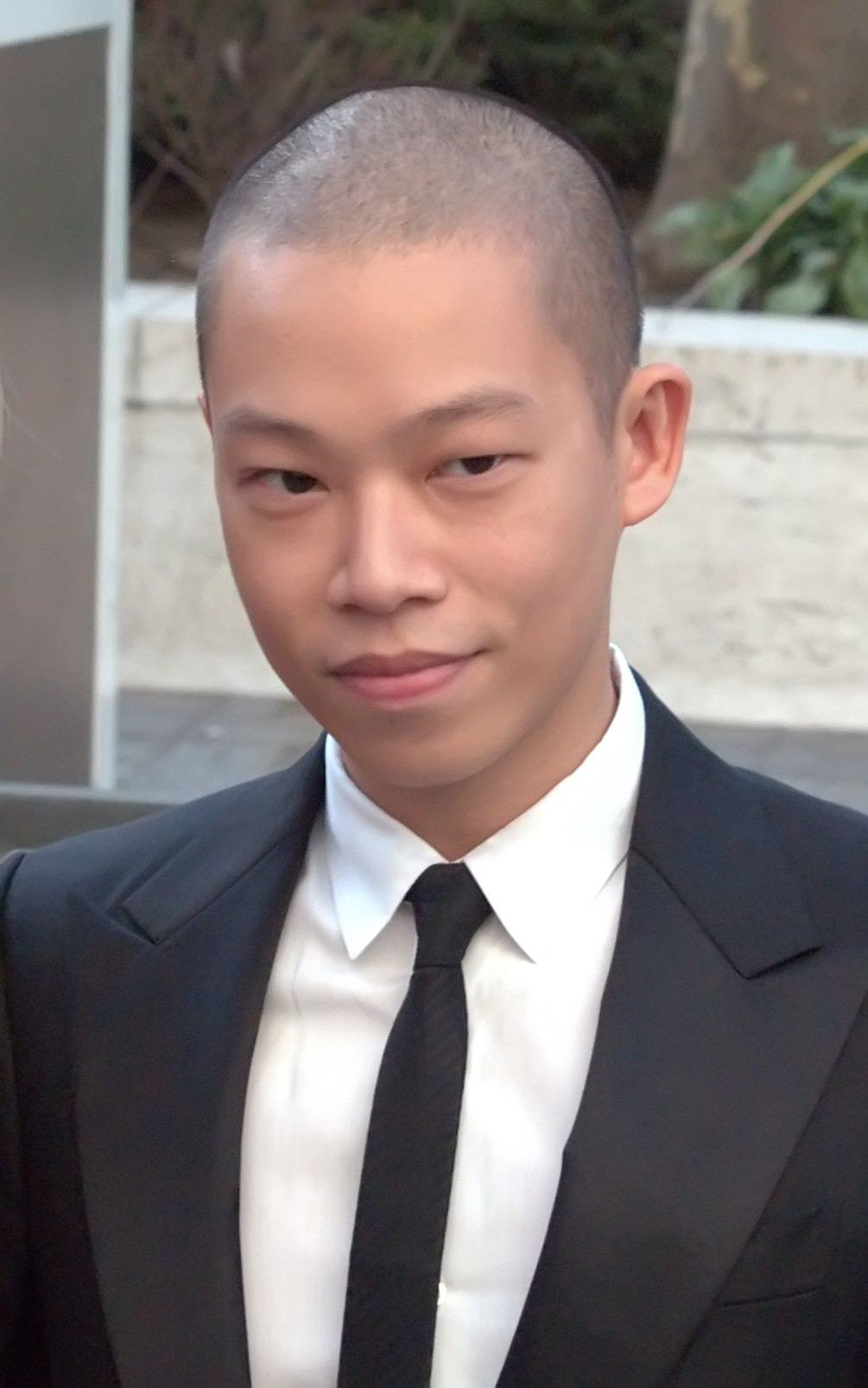
Jason Wu

- Moses Michael Levi Barrow (born Jamal Michael Barrow; 1978), better known by his stage name Shyne, Belizean rapper and politician
- Andrulla Blanchette (born 1966), British-born professional bodybuilder
- Maksim Chmerkovskiy (born 1980), Ukrainian-born Latin ballroom dancer, choreographer, and instructor from ABC's Dancing with the Stars; brother of Val
- Valentin Chmerkovskiy (born 1986), Ukrainian-born professional dancer from ABC's Dancing with the Stars; brother of Maks
- Laura Creavalle (born 1959), Guyanese-born Canadian/American professional bodybuilder
- Lisa Cross (born 1978), British-born professional bodybuilder
- Steven Derounian (1918–2007), Bulgarian-born politician and former United States Representative of New York (1953–1963, 1963–65)
- Heather Foster (born 1966), Jamaican-born American professional bodybuilder
- Bev Francis (born 1955), Australian-born professional bodybuilder, powerlifter, and national shot put champion
- Carolina Herrera (born 1939), Venezuelan-born fashion designer; dress designer of First Ladies from Jacqueline Kennedy Onassis to Michelle Obama
- Kyrie Irving (born 1992), Australian-born American professional basketball player for the Brooklyn Nets (formerly for the Cleveland Cavaliers)
- John Kneller (1916–2009), English-American professor and fifth president of Brooklyn College
- John Leguizamo (born 1964), Colombian-born actor, voice actor, producer, and stand-up comedian
- Sean Patrick Maloney (born 1966), Canadian-born politician and U.S. representative of New York since 2013
- Joel McHale (born 1971), Italian-born actor, comedian, writer, television producer, and television host
- Nicki Minaj (born 1982), Trinidadian-born rapper and singer
- Edward Mosberg (1926–2022), Polish-American Holocaust survivor, educator, and philanthropist
- Pelé (real name Edson Arantes do Nascimento) (born 1940), Brazilian-born iconic soccer player and honorary president of the New York Cosmos; considered the best soccer player of all time
- Keanu Reeves (born 1964), Lebanese-born Canadian/American actor, producer, and musician
- Alana Shipp (born 1982), Barbadian-born Israeli/American professional bodybuilder
- Gene Simmons (real name Chaim Weitz) (born 1949), Israeli-born musician, singer-songwriter, record producer, entrepreneur, actor, television personality, and lead singer of the band Kiss
- Albio Sires (born 1951), Cuban-born politician and United States Representative of New Jersey since 2006
- Snooki (real name Nicole Polizzi) (born 1987), Chilean-born reality television personality from Jersey Shore
- Amelie Veiller Van Norman (1844–1920), French-born American educator and civic reformer
- Bruce Willis (born 1955), German-born American actor, producer, and singer
- Jason Wu (born 1982), Taiwanese-born Canadian/American fashion designer and designer of First Lady Michelle Obama's dresses

== Infamous New Yorkers ==
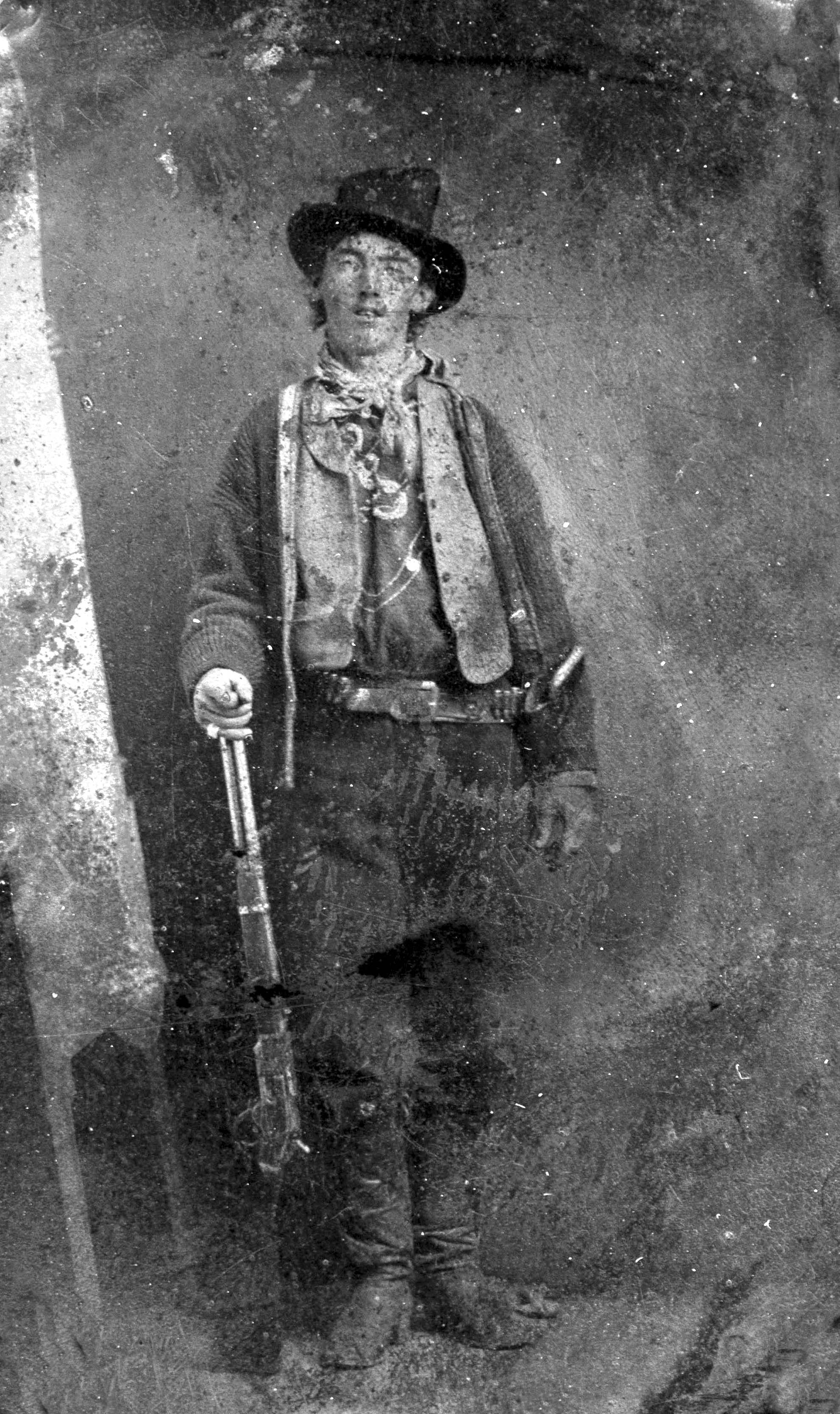
Billy the Kid

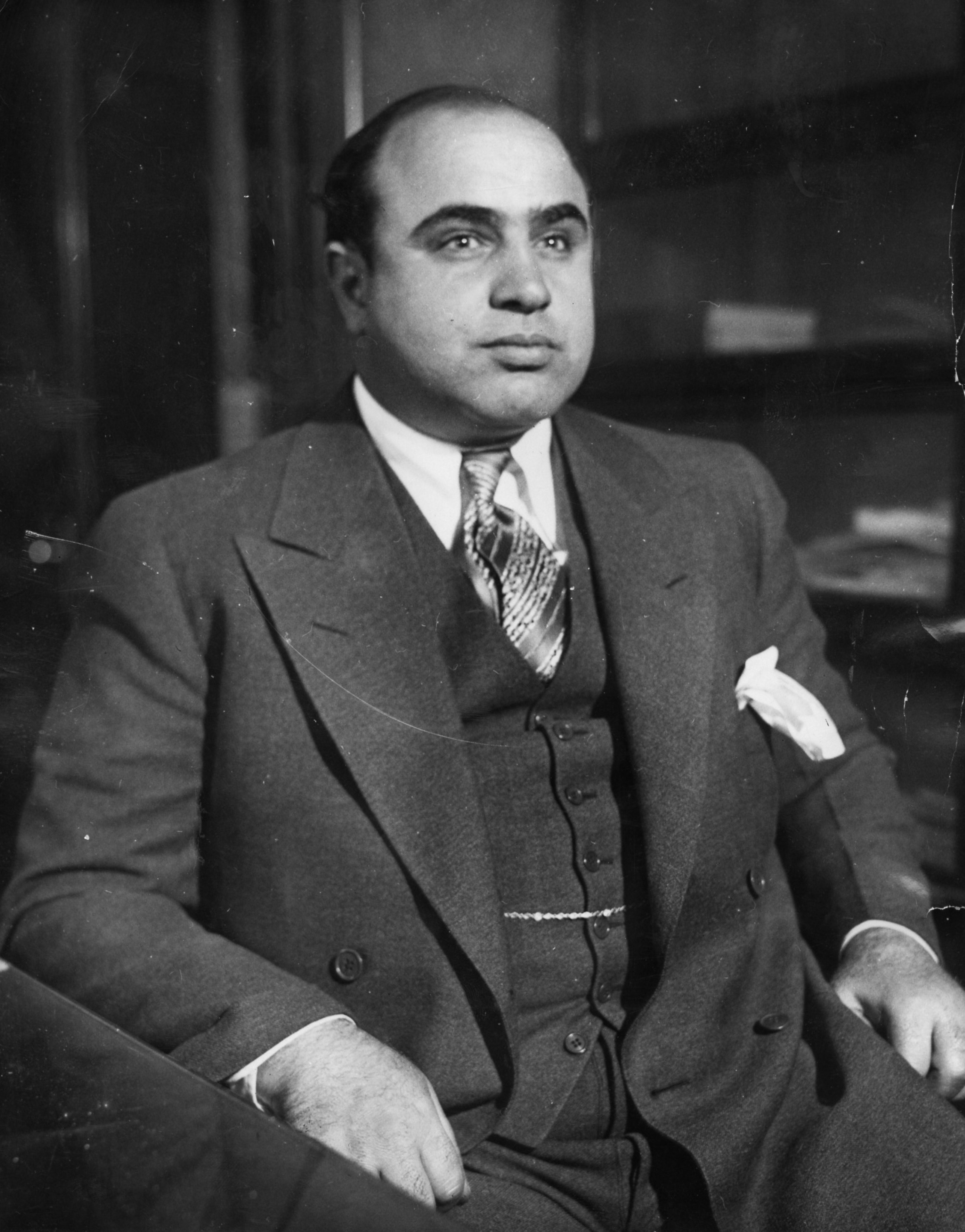
Al Capone

- David Berkowitz (born 1953), serial killer (also known as "Son of Sam" and ".44 Caliber Killer")
- Billy the Kid (1859–1881), notorious wild west criminal
- Al Capone (1899–1947), gangster; co-founder and boss of the Chicago Outfit
- Frank Costello (1891–1973), Italian-American Mafia gangster
- Robert Garrow (1936–1978), spree killer
- David Hampton (1964–2003), actor and impostor; posed as Poitier's son "David" in 1983, which inspired a play and film
- Steven Hoffenberg (1945–2022), CEO and fraudster
- GypsyCrusader (born 1988), far-right political commentator, streamer, white supremacist, former Muay Thai fighter and convicted felon
- Lucky Luciano (1897–1962), mobster; considered the father of modern organized crime in the United States
- Timothy McVeigh (1968–2001), convicted terrorist responsible for the Oklahoma City bombing
- Eugene Palmer (born 1939), fugitive
- Larry Ray (born 1959), criminal convicted of sex trafficking, extortion, forced labor, and other offenses, sentenced to 60 years in prison
- Theodore Rinaldo (1944–2000), convicted child sex offender
- Shirley Winters (born 1948), convicted arsonist and accused serial killer
- Joseph James DeAngelo (born 1945) serial killer (also known as the "Golden State Killer")

== Other ==
- Mary Jane Aldrich (1833–1909), social reformer
- Elnora Monroe Babcock (1852–1934), suffragist
- Helen Morton Barker (1834–1910), social reformer
- Emily Montague Mulkin Bishop (1858–1916), suffragist, writer
- Catharine Paine Blaine (1829–1908), suffragist, teacher
- Lina Beecher (1841–1915), roller coaster designer and inventor
- Margaret McDonald Bottome (1827–1906), reformer, author
- William Boylan (1869–1940), first president of Brooklyn College
- Grace Brown (1886–1906), murder victim
- Kai Cenat (born 2001), streamer
- Lucinda Banister Chandler (1828–1911), social reformer
- Cordelia Throop Cole (1833–1900), social reformer, writer, editor
- Emily Parmely Collins (1814–1909), suffragist, activist, writer
- Julia Colman (1828–1909), social reformer
- Daniel Daly (1873–1937), United States Marine, received Medal of Honor twice
- Rhoda A. Esmond (1819–1894), philanthropist, temperance leader
- Frances Elizabeth Fryatt, specialist in household applied arts
- Mary Ninde Gamewell (1858–1947), missionary, author
- Harry Gideonse (1901–1985), president of Brooklyn College, and chancellor of the New School for Social Research
- Harriet Newell Kneeland Goff (1828–1901), reformer, author
- Wilson Greatbatch (1919–2011), inventor
- Katherine Van Allen Grinnell (1839–1917), social reformer, author
- Ada Van Stone Harris (1866–1923), educator
- Annabel Morris Holvey (1855–1910), social reformer, writer
- Cornelia Collins Hussey (1827–1902), philanthropist, suffragist
- Clarissa Caldwell Lathrop (1847–1892), social reformer
- Annie Le (1985–2009), murdered victim at Yale University
- Maude B. Perkins (1874–1932), educator and temperance reformer
- Jennie Phelps Purvis (1831–1924), suffragist, reformer, writer
- Ellen Sergeant Rude (1838–1916), writer, poet, and temperance reformer
- Frances Shimer (1826–1901), founder of Shimer College
- Jane Slocum (1842–1924), educator, lecturer
- Richard Stallman (born 1953), programmer of Emacs and founder of GNU
- Emily Pitts Stevens (1841–1906), activist, editor
- Katharine Lent Stevenson (1853–1919), reformer, missionary
- Josephine Terranova (1889–1981), criminal defendant
- Mary Evalin Warren (1829–1904), social reformer, author
- Charlotte Fowler Wells (1814–1901), phrenologist
- Mary Traffarn Whitney (1852–1942), minister, reformer, philanthropist
- Margaret E. Winslow (1836–1936), activist, editor, writer

== See also ==
- List of New York (state) suffragists
- List of people associated with Albany County, New York
