= Rohlfs =

Rohlfs is the surname of

- Anna Katharine Rohlfs (Green) (1846–1935), American author
- Charles Rohlfs (1853–1936), American furniture artist
- Christian Rohlfs (1849–1938), German artist
- Eva Ahnert-Rohlfs (1912–1954), German astronomer
- Ewald Rohlfs (1911–?), German test pilot
- Friedrich Gerhard Rohlfs (1831–1896), German explorer in Africa
- Gerhard Rohlfs (1892–1986), German linguist, researcher on Italian and other Romance languages
- Kristen Rohlfs (1930–2017), German astrophysicist
- Nicolaus Rohlfs (18th century), German astronomer
- Roland Rohlfs (1892–1974), American test pilot
