= The Leavenworth Case (1923 film) =

1923 film

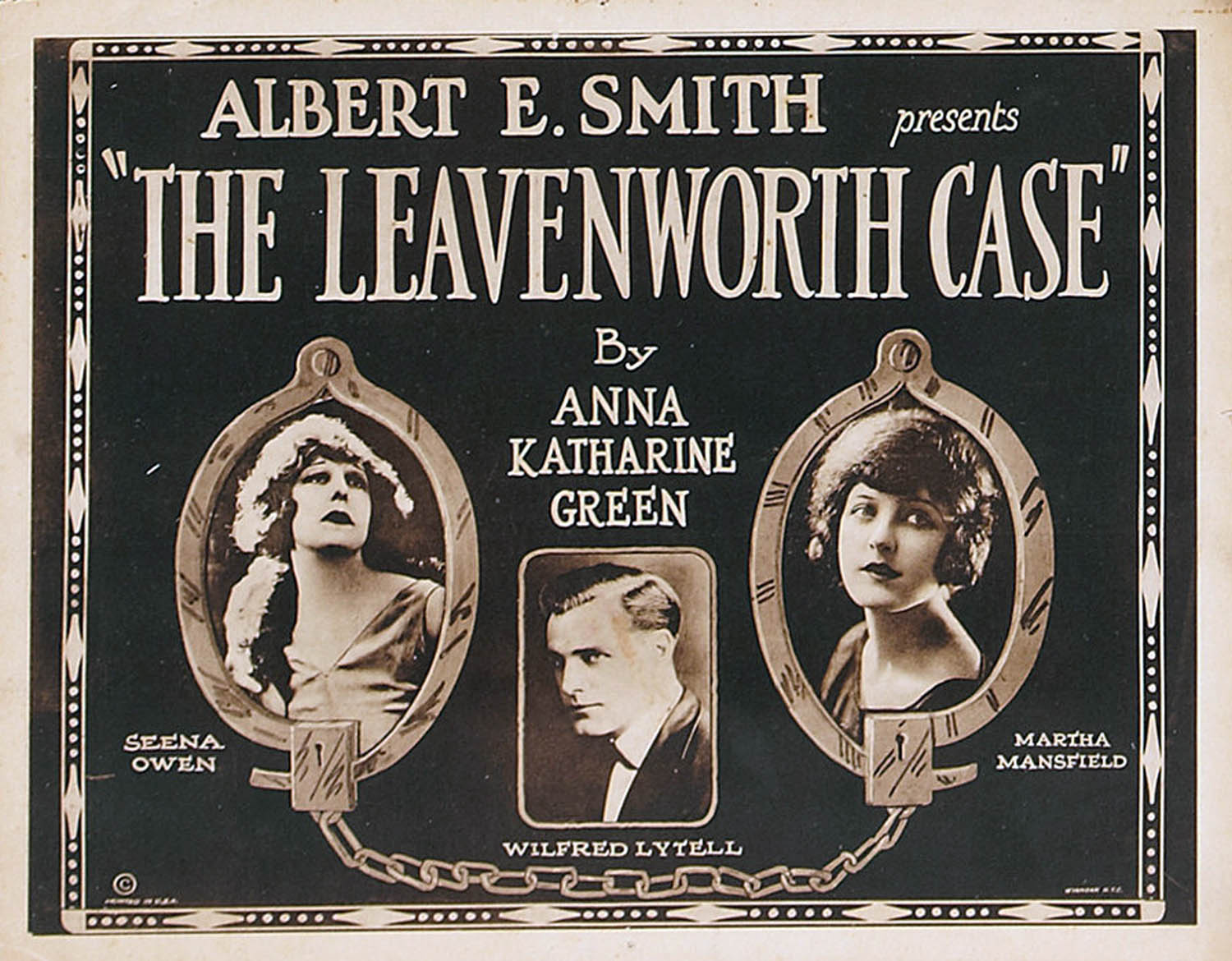
- Directed by: Charles Giblyn
- Written by: Eve Stuyvesant
- Based on: The Leavenworth Case by Anna Katharine Green
- Produced by: Whitman Bennett
- Starring: Seena Owen; Martha Mansfield; Wilfred Lytell
- Cinematography: Edward Paul
- Production company: Whitman Bennett Productions
- Distributed by: Vitagraph Company of America
- Release date: November 4, 1923
- Running time: 60 minutes
- Country: United States
- Language: Silent (English intertitles)

The Leavenworth Case is a 1923 American silent mystery film directed by Charles Giblyn and starring Seena Owen, Martha Mansfield, and Wilfred Lytell. It is based on the 1878 novel The Leavenworth Case by Anna Katharine Green, which was later also adapted into a 1936 sound film of the same title.

== Cast ==
- Seena Owen as Eleanor Leavenworth
- Martha Mansfield as Mary Leavenworth
- Wilfred Lytell as Anderson
- Bradley Barker as Raymond
- Paul Doucet as Harwell
- William Walcott as Leavenworth
- Frances Miller as Dinah
- Fred Miller as Thomas

== Bibliography ==
- Connelly, Robert B. The Silents: Silent Feature Films, 1910-36, Volume 40, Issue 2. December Press, 1998.
- Goble, Alan. The Complete Index to Literary Sources in Film. Walter de Gruyter, 1999. ISBN 3598114923
- Munden, Kenneth White. The American Film Institute Catalog of Motion Pictures Produced in the United States, Part 1. University of California Press, 1997.
