= The Common Law (1923 film) =

1923 film directed by George Archainbaud

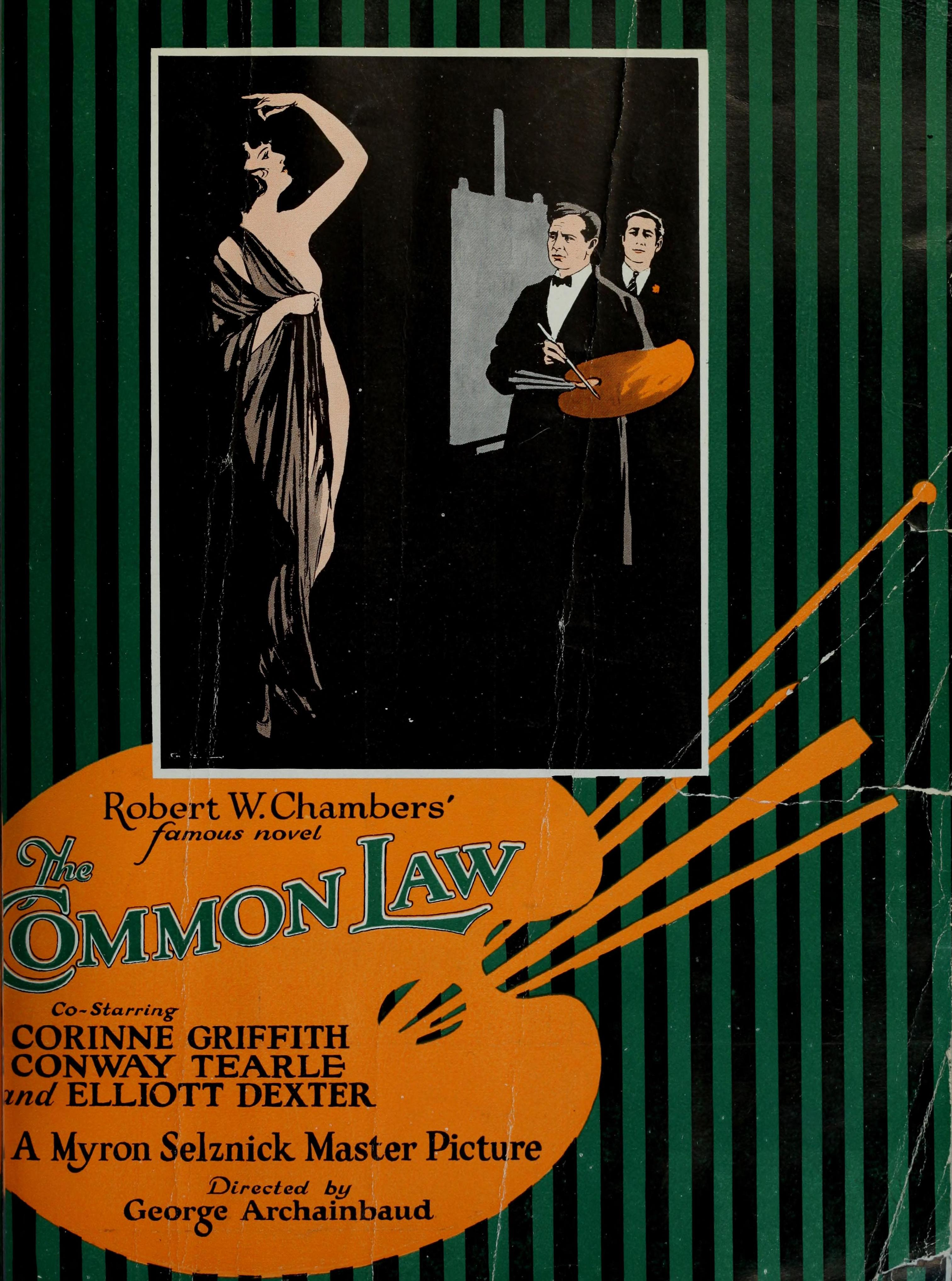
- Directed by: George Archainbaud
- Written by: Edward J. Montagne
- Based on: The Common Law; 1911 novel by Robert William Chambers
- Produced by: Selznick Pictures
- Edited by: Harold McCord
- Distributed by: Selznick Pictures
- Release date: August 30, 1923
- Running time: 80 minutes
- Country: United States
- Language: Silent (English intertitles)

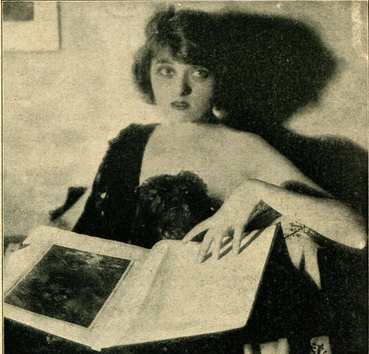
Corinne Griffith in the film.

The Common Law is a 1923 American lost silent drama film directed by George Archainbaud and starring Corinne Griffith and Conway Tearle. Based upon the novel of the same name by Robert William Chambers, the film was produced and released by Selznick Pictures Corporation.

The novel was first filmed as The Common Law in 1916 with Clara Kimball Young as Valerie West. Conway Tearle played the role of Neville in both the 1916 and 1923 films. It was later remade as the talkie The Common Law in 1931 with Constance Bennett and Joel McCrea in the lead roles.

== Plot ==
Valerie West, hungry and tired, presents herself as a model at the studio of painter Louis Neville, which he shares with two other artists. When she is asked whether she poses draped or undraped, she replies that she will do whatever is expected of models. After some time and several daring poses, Louis realizes that he is in love with her. However, the wealthy Neville family opposes any marriage between the two. Valerie makes a sacrifice by agreeing to not marry Louis, but promises him that she will become his common law wife. When Cardemon tries to kiss the model, she lashes him with a whip. In the end, a satisfactory resolution is reached regarding Valerie and Henry.

== Cast ==
- Corinne Griffith as Valerie West
- Conway Tearle as Louis Neville
- Elliott Dexter as Jose Querida
- Hobart Bosworth as Henry Neville
- Lillian Lawrence as Martha Neville
- Bryant Washburn as John Buleson
- Doris May as Stephanie
- Harry Myers as Cardemon
- Miss DuPont as Lily Neville
- Phyllis Haver as Rita Terris
- Wally Van as Samuel Ogilvy
- Dagmar Godowsky as Mazie
- Phyllis Dare

== Preservation ==
With no copies of The Common Law located in any film archives, it is a lost film.
