= Eve Stuyvesant =

- Occupation: Screenwriter

Eve Stuyvesant was an American screenwriter who worked in New York City in the early 1920s.

== Biography ==
Eve was reported to be a direct descendant of Peter Stuyvesant. She originally planned on studying law before she sold her first scenario to Universal. Her earliest work was on the Judge Brown series of films. In 1924, she told reporters that the motion picture industry was ideal for women because it was one of the few fields where they could have the same opportunities as men.

== Selected filmography ==
- Virtuous Liars (1924)
- The Hoosier Schoolmaster (1924)
- The Leavenworth Case (1923)
- The Purple Highway (1923)
