= Marked "Personal" =

1893 detective novel by Anna Katharine Green

First softcover edition published by Putnam (at same time as hardcover)

Marked "Personal" (1893) is a detective novel by American author Anna Katharine Green.

== Synopsis ==
On the evening of July 13, 1863, two men from Washington and Boston, respectively, leave their homes after showing signs of agitation and distress throughout the day. That morning, each one had received a mysterious letter marked 'personal', which they both quickly destroyed.
