= Dagmar Godowsky =

American actress

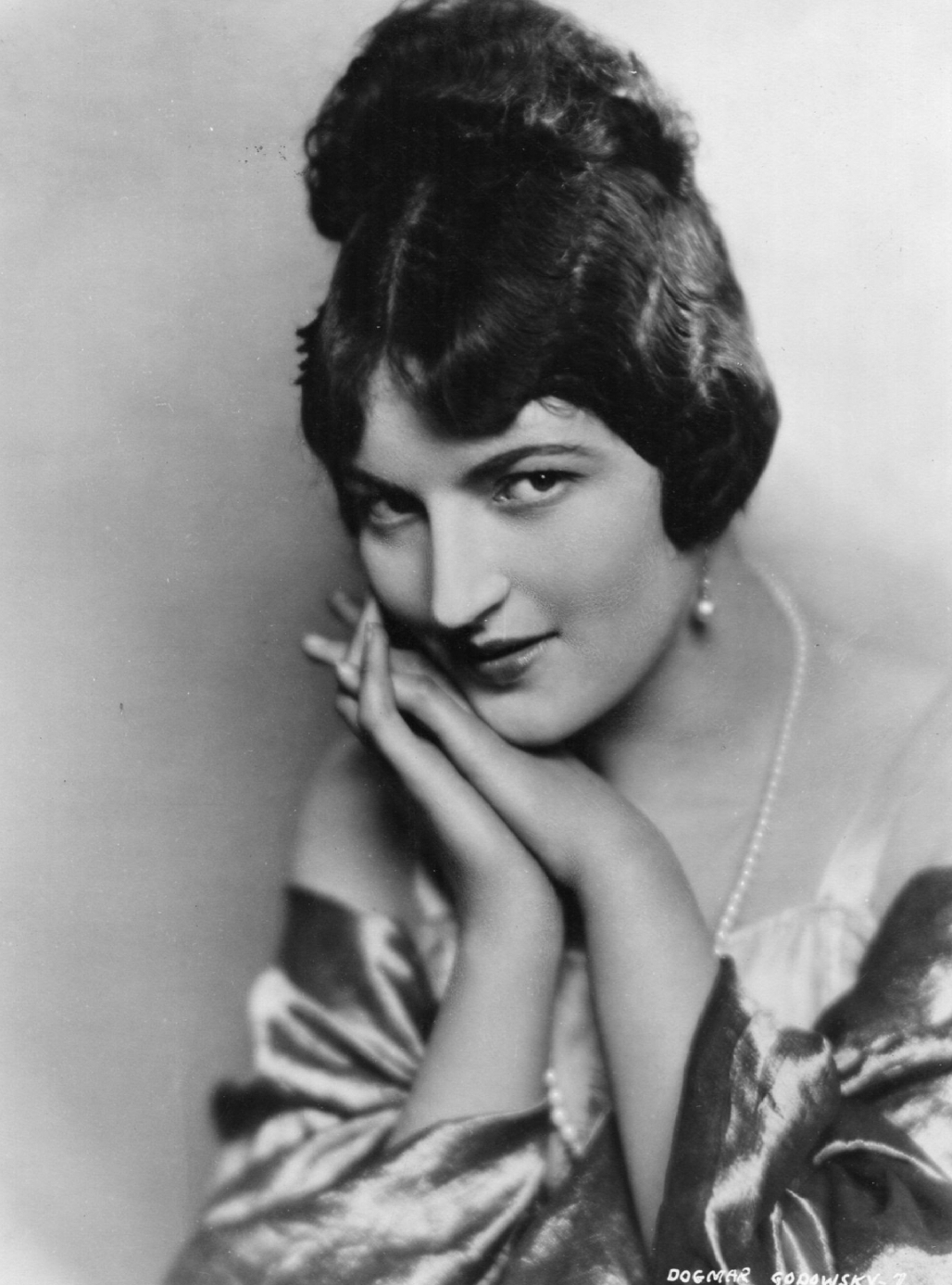
- Godowsky in 1920
- Born: Mercedes Dagmar Godowsky; November 24, 1897; Chicago, Illinois, U.S.
- Died: February 13, 1975 (aged 77); New York City, U.S.
- Occupation: Actress
- Years active: 1919–1926
- Spouses: Frank Mayo (m. 1921; ann. 1926) James D. Sloan (m. 1926, divorced)
- Parent: Leopold Godowsky
- Relatives: Leopold Godowsky Jr. (brother)

Mercedes Dagmar Godowsky (November 24, 1897 – February 13, 1975) was an American silent film actress.

== Biography ==
Godowsky was born in Chicago, Illinois, on November 24, 1897, the daughter of Polish-Jewish composer Leopold Godowsky and Frederica "Frieda" Saxe (1870–1933), who was of German descent, although she later claimed she was born in Vilna, Russian Empire (present-day Vilnius, Lithuania) in her autobiography, First Person Plural. She had an older sister, Vanita Hedwig (1892–1961), and two younger brothers, Leopold Godowsky Jr. and Gutram "Gordon" (1905–1932), who was born in Berlin. In November 1914, the family immigrated from Liverpool, England, to Montreal, Quebec, in Canada.

Her Hollywood film career spanned the years from 1919 through 1926. She played in A Sainted Devil (1924) with Rudolph Valentino and The Story Without a Name (1924). The latter co-starred Tyrone Power Sr. and Louis Wolheim. Among her other film credits are Red Lights (1923), The Common Law (1923), Virtuous Liars (1924), and The Price of a Party (1924).

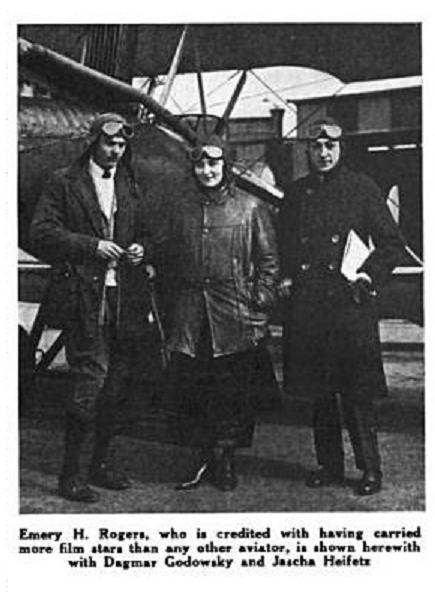
Left to right, Hollywood studio pilot Emery H. Rogers, actress Dagmar Godowsky and violinist Jascha Heifetz (1920)

== Personal life ==
Godowsky wed silent screen actor Frank Mayo in Tijuana, Mexico, on October 2, 1921. The marriage was annulled on August 28, 1926, on the grounds that Mayo had not divorced his previous wife. On June 24, 1926, Godowsky remarried to James D. Sloan.

In 1958, Godowsky published a thoroughly candid (disputed; according to the Arthur Rubinstein biography by Harvey Sachs, Godowsky's memoirs were "apparently uninhibited but in fact heavily self-censored") autobiography titled First Person Plural. She wrote, "I lived only for pleasure and I spoiled my own fun. Where was I running? From whom? Little feet running around the globe. Nothing but circles, and I never once bumped into myself."

In the book, she named Enrico Caruso, Arthur Rubinstein, Jascha Heifetz, Charles Chaplin, Igor Stravinsky, and Valentino among her "great loves." When queried about the number of husbands she had, Godowsky responded, "Two of my own, my dear, and several of my friends'."

In her later years, she made frequent appearances in London and on television talk shows in New York City.

== Death ==
Godowsky died aged 77 in Lenox Hill Hospital in Manhattan on February 13, 1975. It was the anniversary of her father's birth. Her funeral was held at Riverside Chapel. She was buried at Mount Hope Cemetery in Westchester, New York. She was survived by her brother, Leopold. He was married to Frances Gershwin, sister of George Gershwin.

== Partial filmography ==
- The Red Lantern (1919)
- Bonds of Honor (1919)
- The Kid and the Cowboy (1919)
- Stronger Than Death (1920)
- Hitchin' Posts (1920)
- The Forged Bride (1920)
- The Path She Chose (1920)
- The Trap (1922)
- The Strangers' Banquet (1922)
- The Altar Stairs (1922)
- Red Lights (1923)
- The Common Law (1923)
- The Story Without a Name (1924)
- Meddling Women (1924)
- A Sainted Devil (1924)
- Virtuous Liars (1924)
- Roulette (1924)
- Greater Than Marriage (1924)
- Playthings of Desire (1924)
- The Lost Chord (1925)
- Camille of the Barbary Coast (1925)
- The Price of a Party (1926)
- In Borrowed Plumes (1926)
