= The Story Without a Name =

1924 film by Irvin Willat

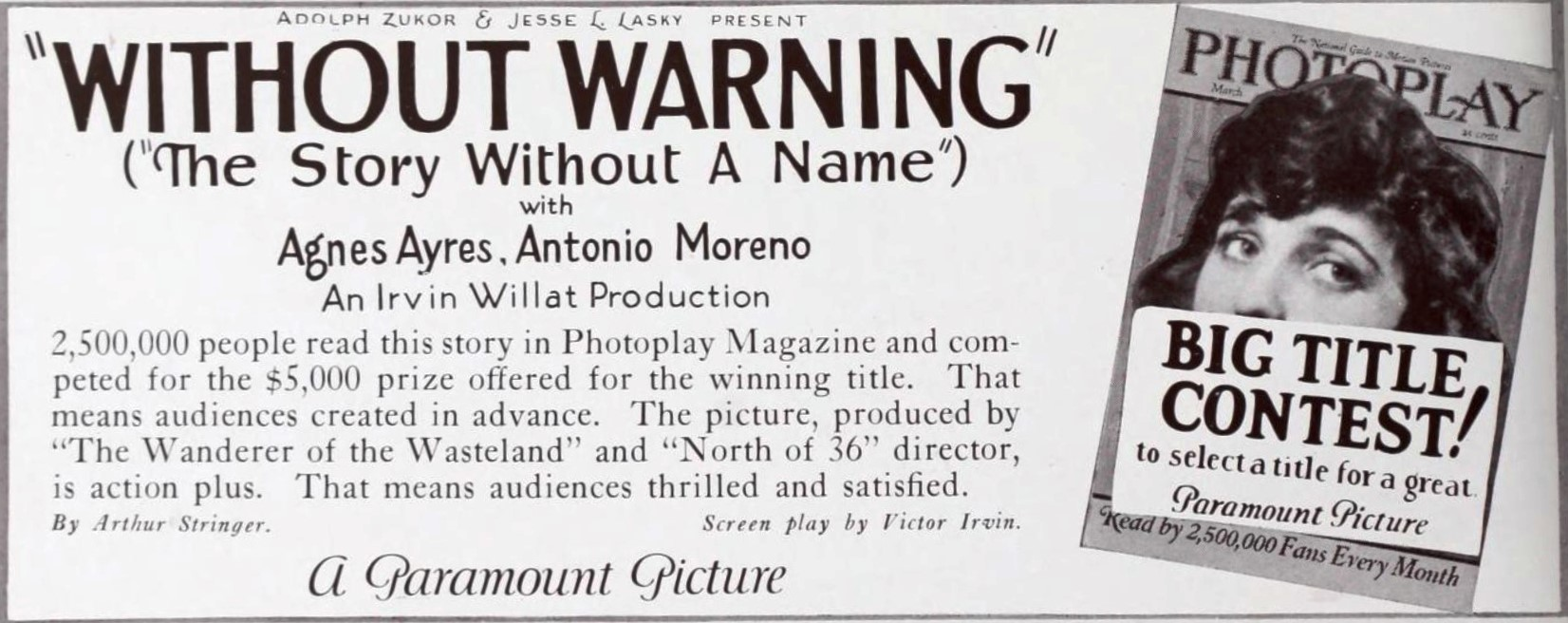
- Advertisement using the alternative title
- Directed by: Irvin Willat
- Written by: Victor Irvin (scenario)
- Based on: The Story Without a Name by Arthur Stringer
- Produced by: Adolph Zukor; Jesse Lasky
- Starring: Agnes Ayres
- Cinematography: Harold Rosson
- Distributed by: Paramount Pictures
- Release date: October 27, 1924 (U.S.)
- Running time: 6 reels
- Country: United States
- Language: Silent (English intertitles)

The Story Without a Name is a 1924 American silent melodrama film directed by Irvin Willat and based on a novel by Arthur Stringer, which was published in conjunction with the film. It was produced by Famous Players–Lasky and distributed by Paramount Pictures and stars Agnes Ayres. A contest run by Photoplay magazine asked viewers to select a title for the film for a prize of $5,000, with the alternative title Without Warning selected as the winning entry.

A 1952 film noir with the title Without Warning! had a working title of The Story Without a Name, but the plots of the two films are quite different.

== Cast ==
- Agnes Ayres as Mary Walsworth
- Antonio Moreno as Alan Holt
- Tyrone Power Sr. as Drakma (credited as Tyrone Power)
- Louis Wolheim as Kurder
- Dagmar Godowsky as Claire
- Jack Lionel Bohm as Don Powell
- Maurice Costello as The Cripple
- Frank Currier as Admiral Walsworth
- Ivan Linow as Lab assistant

== Preservation ==
With no prints of The Story Without a Name located in any film archives, it is a lost film.
