= The Leavenworth Case (1936 film) =

1936 film by Lewis D. Collins

- Theatrical release poster
- Directed by: Lewis D. Collins
- Screenplay by: Albert DeMond; Sidney Sutherland
- Based on: The Leavenworth Case by Anna Katharine Green
- Starring: Donald Cook; Jean Rouverol; Norman Foster; Erin O'Brien-Moore; Maude Eburne; Warren Hymer
- Cinematography: Jack A. Marta; Ernest Miller
- Edited by: Dan Milner
- Production company: Republic Pictures
- Distributed by: Republic Pictures
- Release date: January 20, 1936
- Running time: 66 minutes
- Country: United States
- Language: English

The Leavenworth Case is a 1936 American mystery film directed by Lewis D. Collins and written by Albert DeMond and Sidney Sutherland. It is based on the 1878 novel The Leavenworth Case by Anna Katharine Green. The film stars Donald Cook, Jean Rouverol, Norman Foster, Erin O'Brien-Moore, Maude Eburne and Warren Hymer. The film was released on January 20, 1936, by Republic Pictures.

== Cast ==
- Donald Cook as Dr. Truman Harwell
- Jean Rouverol as Eleanore Leavenworth
- Norman Foster as Detective Bob Grice
- Erin O'Brien-Moore as Mrs. Silas (Gloria) Leavenworth
- Maude Eburne as Phoebe Leavenworth
- Warren Hymer as Detective O'Malley
- Frank Sheridan as Silas Leavenworth
- Gavin Gordon as Henry Clavering
- Clay Clement as Inspector Holmes
- Ian Wolfe as Hudson
- Peggy Stratford as Miss Owens
- Archie Robbins as Duke
- Bess Staffor as The Bulldog Woman
- Lucille Ward as The Pekingese Woman
- Belle Mitchell as The Cat Woman
- Marie Rice as Sarah
- Carl Stockdale as Leavenworth-Clavering Bookkeeper

== Production ==
On November 26, 1935, it was reported Arthur Lubin was directing the film.

== Critical reception ==
Variety offered a negative review and wrote, "What should have been an intriguing sleuth-murder mystery film wobbles badly though inept casting and slovenly direction." Norman Foster was described as "entirely unsuited for such a role", but "bright moments are contributed by Maude Eburne … and Warren Hymer."
