= The Price of a Party =

1924 film by Charles Giblyn

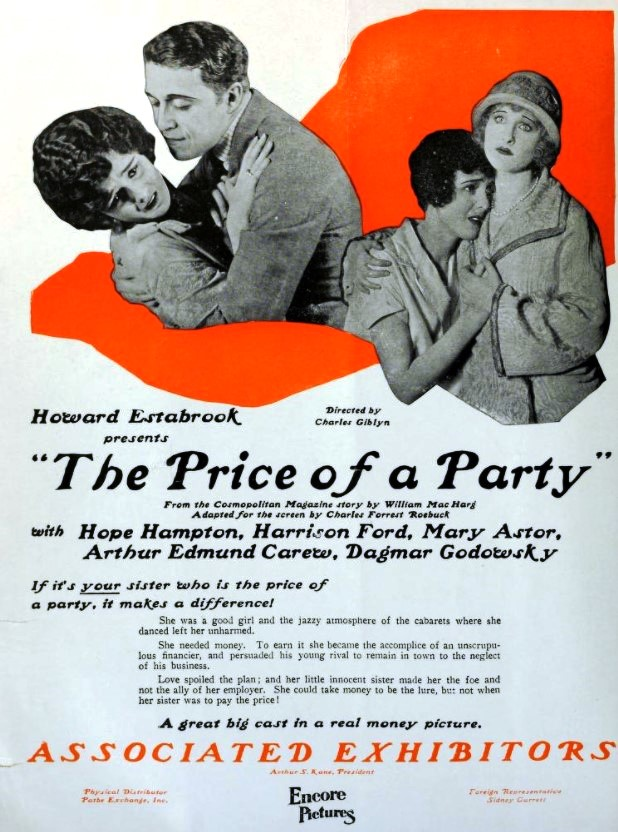
- Advertisement
- Directed by: Charles Giblyn
- Written by: Charles F. Roebuck (scenario)
- Based on: "The Price of the Party" by William Briggs MacHarg
- Produced by: Howard Estabrook
- Starring: Hope Hampton; Harrison Ford; Arthur Edmund Carewe; Mary Astor
- Cinematography: John F. Seitz
- Production company: Howard Estabrook Productions
- Distributed by: Associated Exhibitors
- Release date: December 23, 1924
- Running time: 60 mins.
- Country: United States
- Language: Silent (English intertitles)

The Price of a Party is a 1924 American silent melodrama film produced by Howard Estabrook and distributed by Associated Exhibitors. The film is based on a short story of the same name by William Briggs MacHarg published in Cosmopolitan magazine, with the film's scenario written by Charles F. Roebuck. It was directed by Charles Giblyn and stars Hope Hampton and Harrison Ford. The film was shot in Tec Art Studios.

In 2014, it was reported that an incomplete copy of the film was found in Navarre, Spain.

== Cast ==
- Hope Hampton as Grace Barrows
- Harrison Ford as Robert Casson
- Arthur Edmund Carewe as Kenneth Bellwood
- Mary Astor as Alice Barrows
- Dagmar Godowsky as Evelyn Dolores
- Fred Hadley as Stephen Durrell
- Edna Richmond as Evelyn's Maid
- Donald Lashey as Hall Boy
- Florence Richardson as Jazz Queen
- Daniel Pennell
- J. Moy Bennett

== Preservation ==
A print of The Price of a Party has now been located and is now not considered a lost film.
