= Virtuous Liars =

1924 film

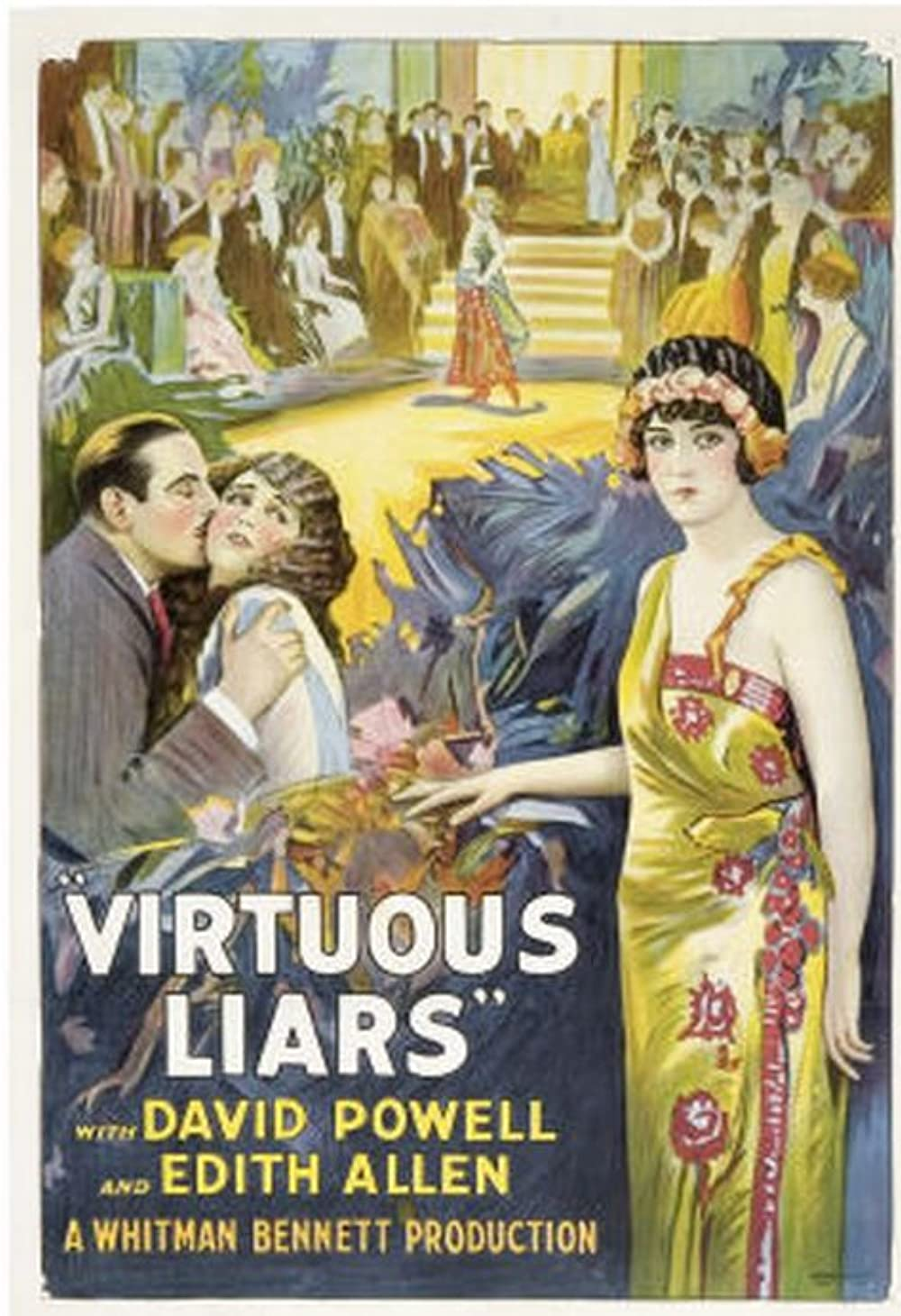
- Poster
- Directed by: Whitman Bennett
- Written by: E.C. Holland; Eve Stuyvesant
- Produced by: Whitman Bennett
- Starring: David Powell; Maurice Costello; Dagmar Godowsky
- Cinematography: Edward Paul
- Production company: Whitman Bennett Productions
- Distributed by: Vitagraph Company of America
- Release date: May 18, 1924
- Running time: 60 minutes
- Country: United States
- Language: Silent (English intertitles)

Virtuous Liars is a 1924 American silent drama film directed by Whitman Bennett and starring David Powell, Edith Allen, Maurice Costello, and Dagmar Godowsky. A man abandons his wife and child and goes to live in Havana with another woman. His wife makes a success of herself, but he then returns and attempts to blackmail her.

== Plot ==
As described in a film magazine review, Jack Banton deserts his wife Edith and their three-year-old child, goes to Havana, and becomes involved with Juanita, a young Cuban woman. Edith pursues an art career, aided by Josiah Wright, a wealthy man, whose nephew, Dr. Norman Wright, is engaged to Julia Livingston. Josiah dies, leaving Edith a fortune. She loves Dr. Wright. Jack returns, blackmails his wife and abducts the child. Juanita follows Jack. Edith buys her freedom from Jack, who is slain by a Cuban who is infatuated with Juanita. Julia breaks her engagement with Dr. Wright, who weds Edith.

== Cast ==
- David Powell as Norman Wright
- Edith Allen as Edith Banton
- Maurice Costello as Josiah Wright
- Dagmar Godowsky as Juanita
- Ralph Kellard as Jack Banton
- Naomi Childers as Julia Livingston
- Burr McIntosh as Livingston

== Preservation ==
A print is preserved in the Library of Congress collection.

== Bibliography ==
- Munden, Kenneth White. The American Film Institute Catalog of Motion Pictures Produced in the United States, Part 1. University of California Press, 1997.
