= The Forged Bride =

1920 film

- Directed by: Douglas Gerrard
- Screenplay by: Hal Hoadley
- Story by: J.G. Hawks
- Starring: Thomas Jefferson; Mary MacLaren; Harold Miller; Dorothy Hagan; J. Barney Sherry; Dagmar Godowsky
- Production company: Universal Film Manufacturing Company
- Distributed by: Universal Film Manufacturing Company
- Release date: March 8, 1920
- Running time: 50 minutes
- Country: United States
- Language: English

The Forged Bride is a 1920 American silent drama film directed by Douglas Gerrard and written by Hal Hoadley. The film stars Thomas Jefferson, Mary MacLaren, Harold Miller, Dorothy Hagan, J. Barney Sherry and Dagmar Godowsky. The film was released on March 8, 1920, by Universal Film Manufacturing Company.

== Cast ==
- Thomas Jefferson as Bill Butters
- Mary MacLaren as Peggy
- Harold Miller as Dick Van Courtland
- Dorothy Hagan as Dick's Mother
- J. Barney Sherry as Clark Farrell
- Dagmar Godowsky as Clara Ramerez

== Preservation ==
With no holdings located in archives, The Forged Bride is considered a lost film.
