= Roland Rohlfs =

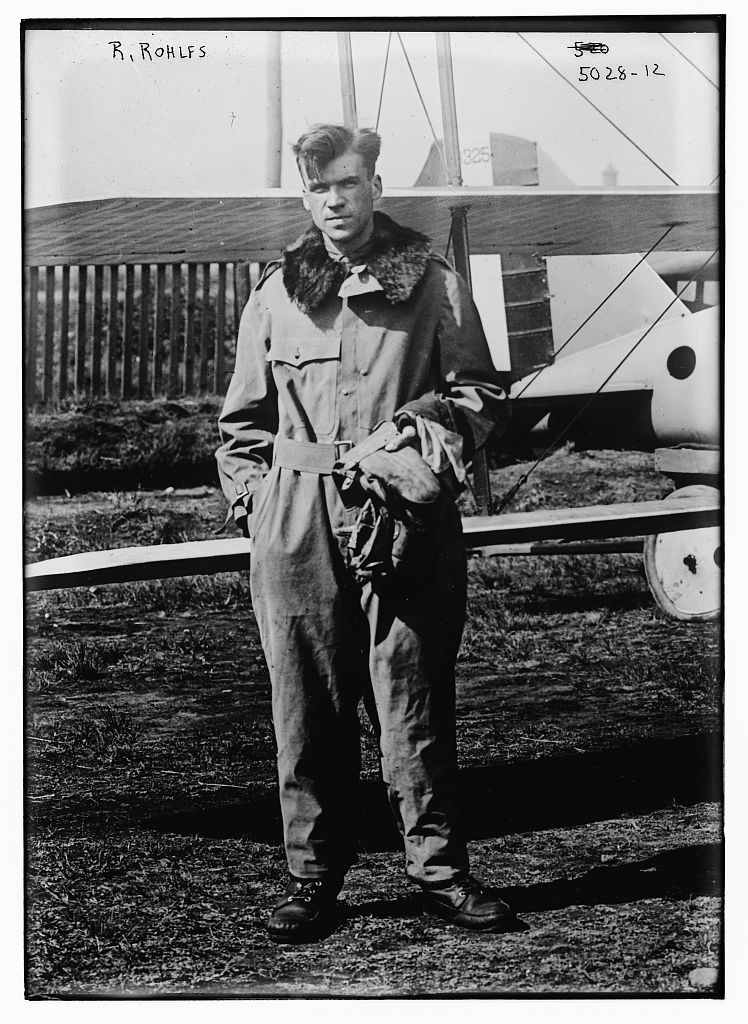
- Roland Rohlfs on September 18, 1919
- Born: February 10, 1892; Buffalo, New York, U.S.
- Died: February 28, 1974 (aged 82)
- Occupation: Aviator
- Employer: Curtiss Aeroplane and Motor Company
- Known for: Aviation speed and altitude records
- Parent: Anna Katharine Green (mother) Charles Rohlfs (father)

Roland Rohlfs (February 10, 1892 – February 28, 1974) was an American aviator.

== Biography ==
Roland Rohlfs was born in Buffalo, New York on February 10, 1892, the son of Anna Katharine Green, the crime novelist; and Charles Rohlfs, the actor and furniture craftsman.

Rohlfs flew a hydro-aeroplane called the "Dunkirk Fighter" for Curtiss Aeroplane and Motor Company in 1918. Later that year he broke the flight airspeed record while flying a Curtiss Wasp, his speed was clocked at 163.1 mph (262.4 km/h).

In 1919 he broke another world record when he flew to an altitude of 34,610 feet in a Curtiss L-3 triplane (at - 47 degrees Fahrenheit).

He died on February 28, 1974.

== See also ==
- History of aviation
