= Charles Rohlfs =

American furniture maker (1853–1936)

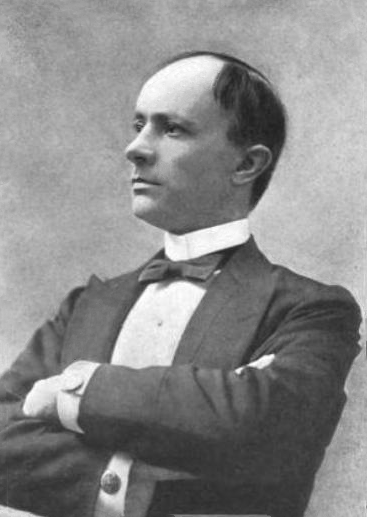
- Rohlfs circa 1903
- Born: February 15, 1853; New York City
- Died: June 30, 1936 (aged 83)
- Spouse: Anna Katharine Green (m. 1884; died 1935)
- Children: 3, including Roland

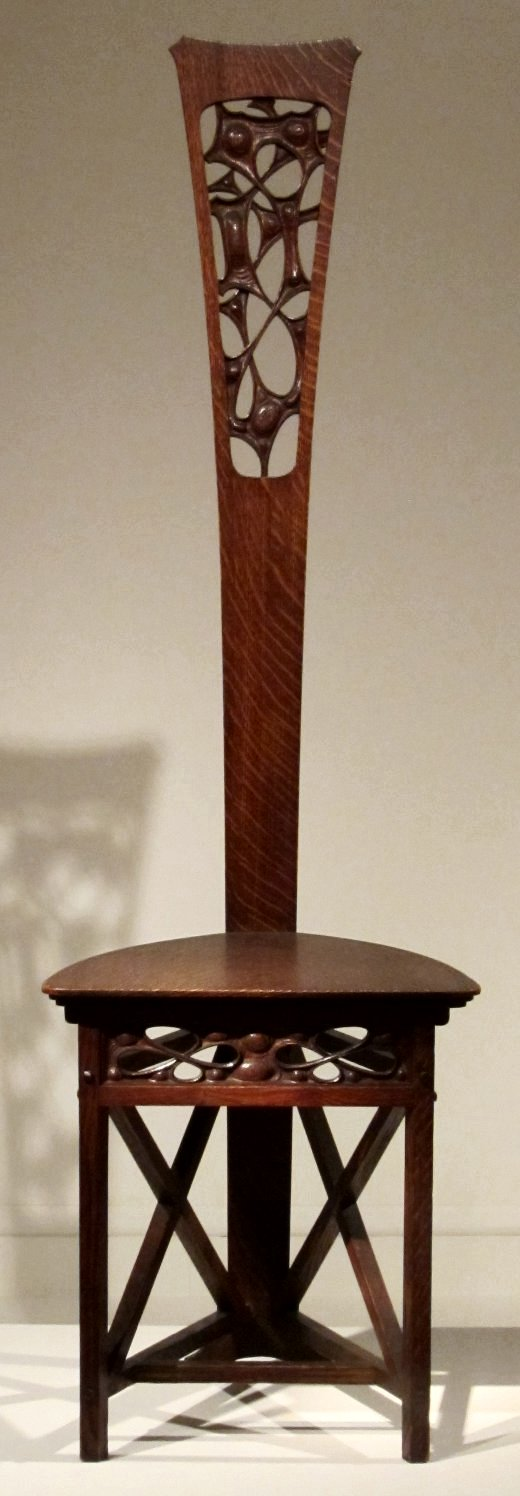
Oak Chair, Rohlfs, early 1900s, Metropolitan Museum of Art.

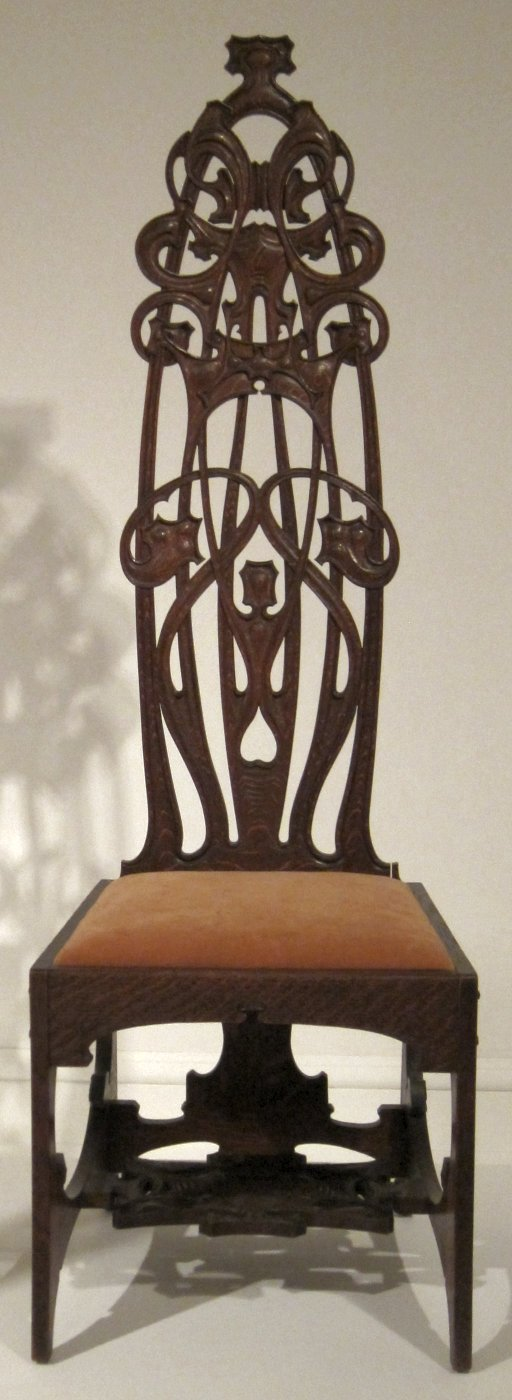
Oak Chair, Rohlfs, 1898-9, Princeton University Art Museum.

Charles Rohlfs (February 15, 1853 – June 30, 1936), was an American actor, patternmaker, stove designer and furniture maker. Rohlfs was a representative of the Arts and Crafts Movement, and was most famous for his skill as a furniture designer and maker.

== Life and career ==
Rohlfs was born in Brooklyn and studied at the Cooper Union in Manhattan. As a young man, he worked as a stove pattern-maker while pursuing his career as an actor. He received several patents for stove designs, but had limited success as an actor. (Reading a review in 1895 in which a Chicago critic wrote, "His face is comedy, his spindling legs are comedy, and those ponderous double-jointed, floppy hands of his would be two separate and distinct boons to any eccentric comedian" - and Rohlfs was performing a serious role - may have been a turning point in his choice of careers.) He married the successful crime novelist Anna Katharine Green in 1884. After their marriage, he continued his career in the stove industry, and later made another attempt to establish his reputation as an actor. Rohlfs's father-in-law had been prominent in the Republican Party in New York City, and in 1896, Rohlfs participated in public debates in support of William McKinley's presidential campaign.

Rohlfs designed and made furniture for his family's use as early as 1888, but he did not commence his decade-long career as a professional furniture maker until 1897. Rohlfs had no professional training as a furniture maker. By century's end, Rohlfs had set up a shop on Washington Street in downtown Buffalo and began producing examples of what he called "artistic furniture" or the "Rohlfs style." Starting in 1899, Chicago retailer Marshall Field advertised and offered furniture and other decorative objects by Rohlfs, but sales fell short of expectations.

Rohlfs participated at the Arts and Crafts Exhibition at the National Arts Club in New York in December 1900. The next year, he participated both as an exhibitor and as an organizer of the Pan-American Exposition in his hometown of Buffalo. The Exposition brought him fame. "So far as furniture is concerned, Buffalo can claim to hold the most original man in America," one enthusiastic Berlin commentator wrote about Rohlfs' work. Rohlfs is the only American furniture maker known to have participated in the International Exposition of Decorative Art in Turin in 1902. Perhaps as a result of the exposure he received there, Rohlfs became a member of the Royal Society of Arts in London.

After he retired from furniture making around 1907, Rohlfs became a leader of the Chamber of Commerce in Buffalo. He actively campaigned for child labor reform and was an advocate of the metric system.

An art critic writes, "The photographs in the exhibition of the house that the Rohlfs designed and build [i.e., built] at 156 Park St. (still extant) in 1912 reveal a sense of structural harmony between woodwork and furniture that sidesteps typical Victorian clutter."

He died on June 30, 1936, in Buffalo, New York. He was widowed a year earlier.

== Family ==
Rohlfs and Anna Katharine Green had one daughter and two sons. Sterling Rohlfs, a ranch manager, died piloting a private plane over Mexico in 1928. After World War I, Roland Rohlfs was a record-holding test pilot.

== Works ==
An exhibition, entitled The Artistic Furniture of Charles Rohlfs, was organized by the Milwaukee Art Museum, Chipstone Foundation and American Decorative Art 1900 Foundation. From 2009 to 2011, the exhibition was presented at the Milwaukee Art Museum, Dallas Museum of Art, Carnegie Museum of Art, Huntington Art Collections and Metropolitan Museum of Art.

Works by Charles Rohlfs are included in the collections of the Art Institute of Chicago, Brooklyn Museum, Carnegie Museum of Art, Dallas Museum of Art, Detroit Institute of Arts, High Museum of Art, Huntington Art Collections, Los Angeles County Museum of Art, Metropolitan Museum of Art, Milwaukee Art Museum, Munson-Williams-Proctor Arts Institute, Museum of Fine Arts-Boston, Nelson-Atkins Museum of Art, Princeton University Art Museum, Saint Louis Art Museum, Toledo Museum of Art, Two Red Roses Foundation, Virginia Museum of Fine Art and Wolfsonian-FIU.

During the Philadelphia edition of Antiques Roadshow in November 2007, a mahogany chair designed by Rohlfs was appraised for between $80,0000 - $120,000 (updated in 2020- valued at $220,000).

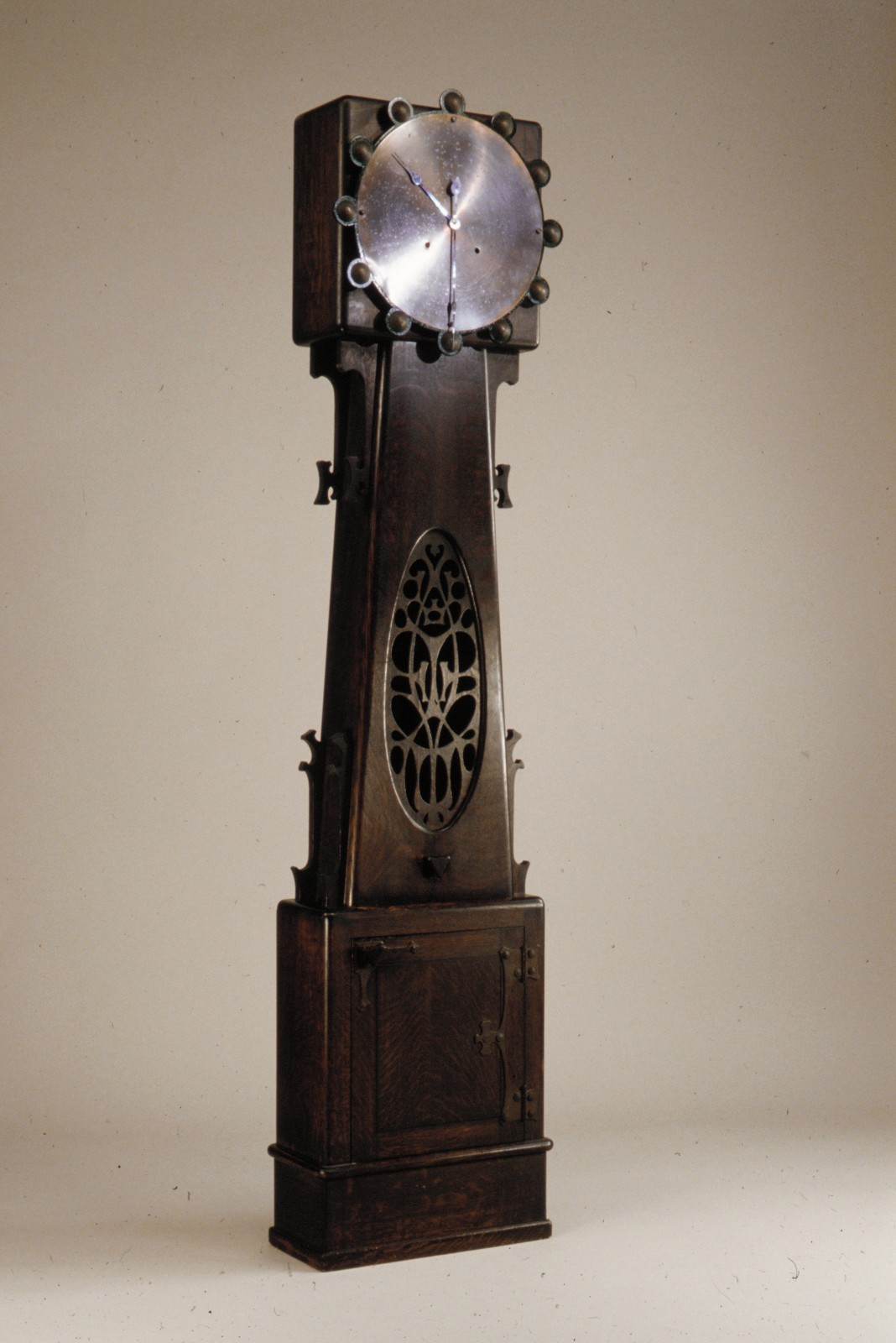
Tall Clock, Rohlfs, ca.1900, Metropolitan Museum of Art

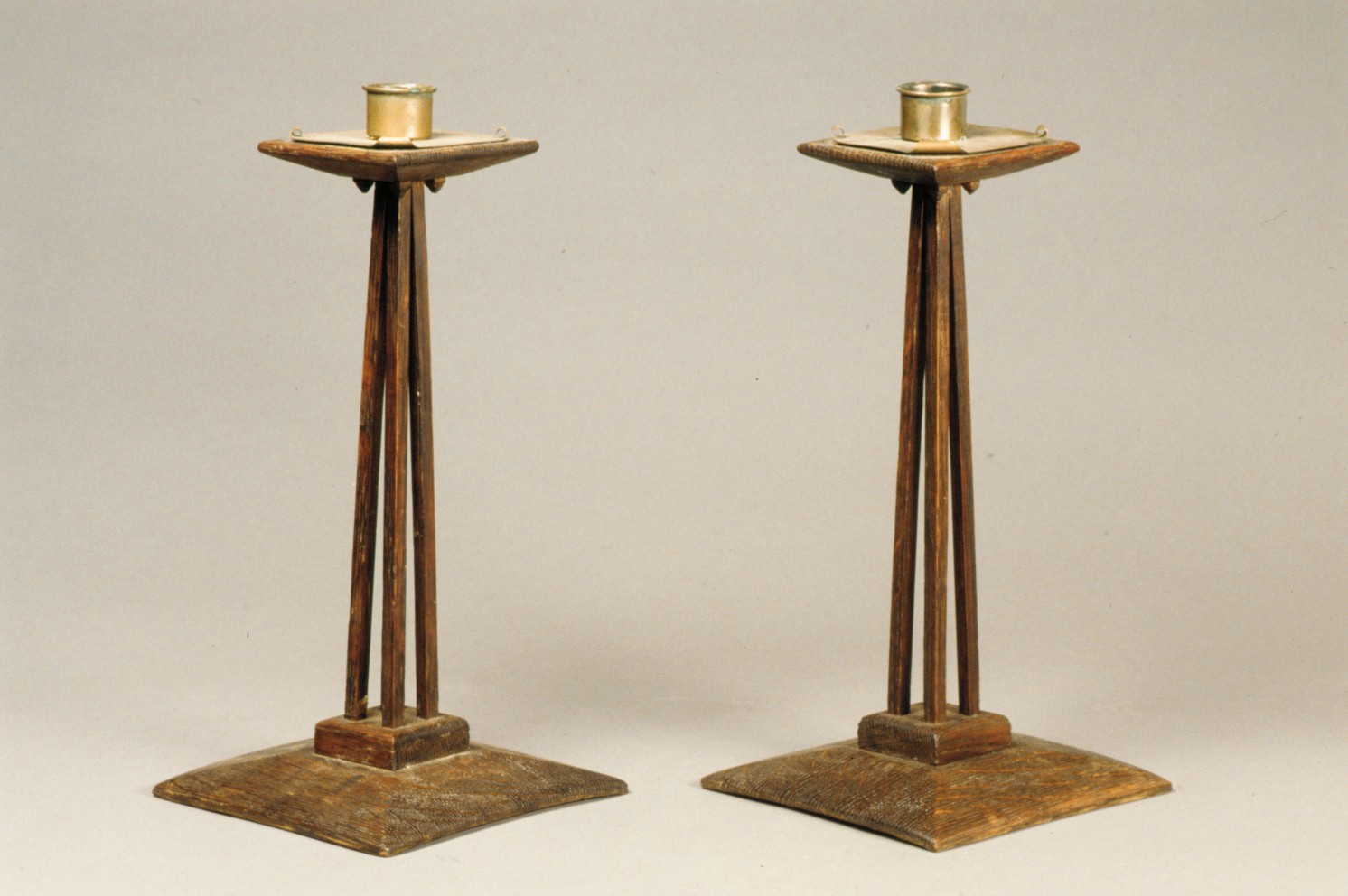
Candlesticks, Rohlfs, 1904, Metropolitan Museum of Art

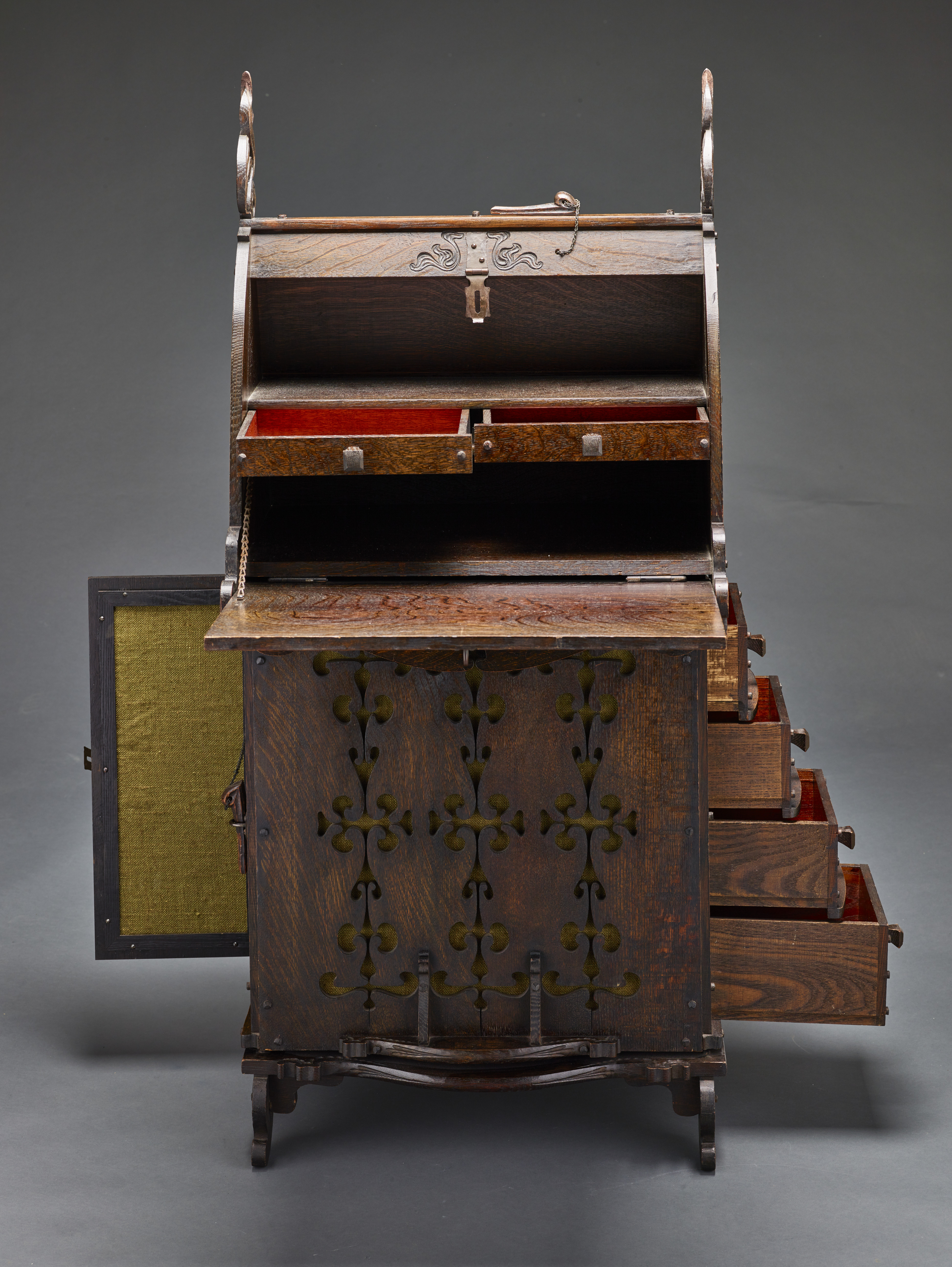
Desk (Model #500), Rohlfs, 1899-1901, Dallas Museum of Art

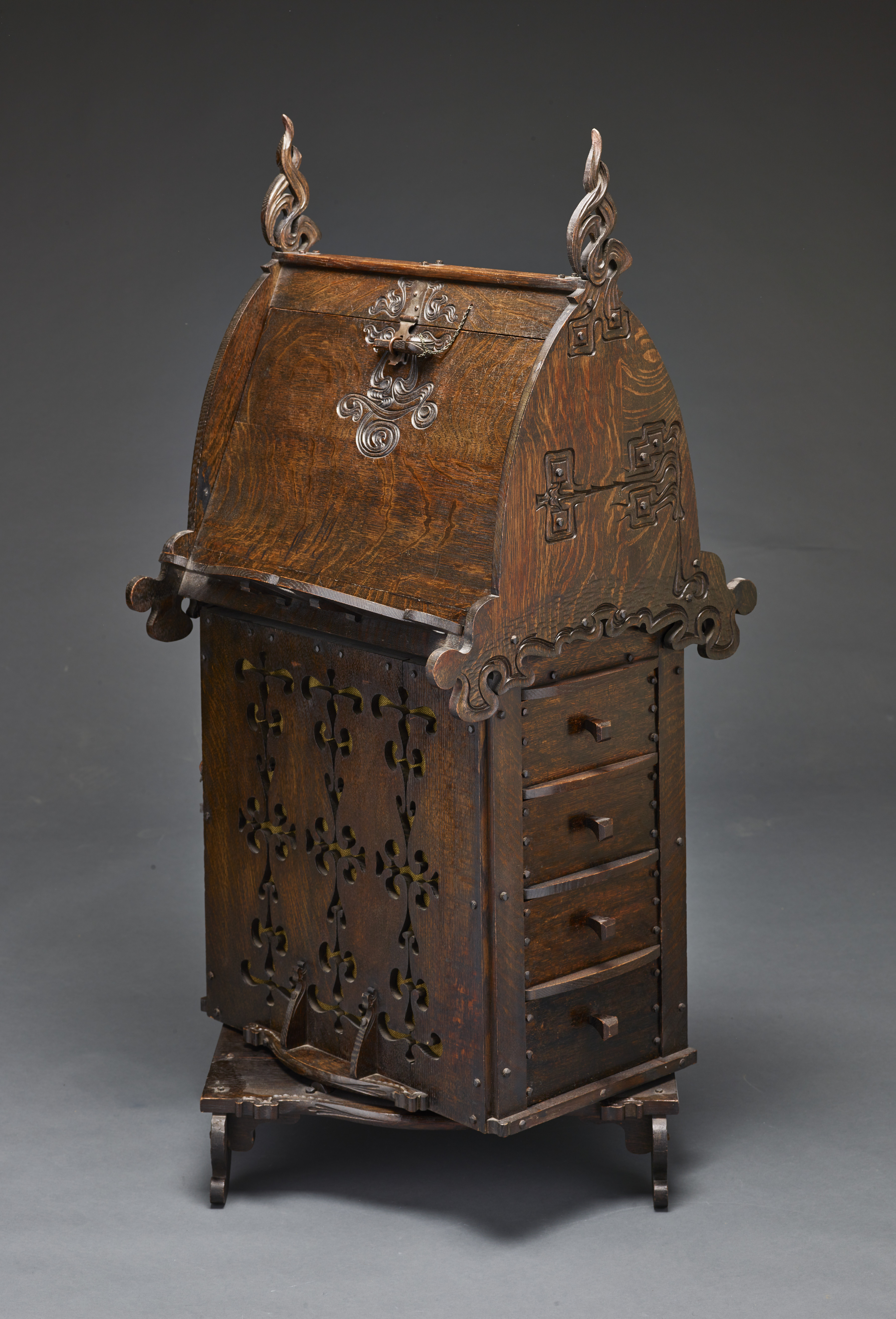
Desk (Model #500), Rohlfs, 1899-1901, Dallas Museum of Art

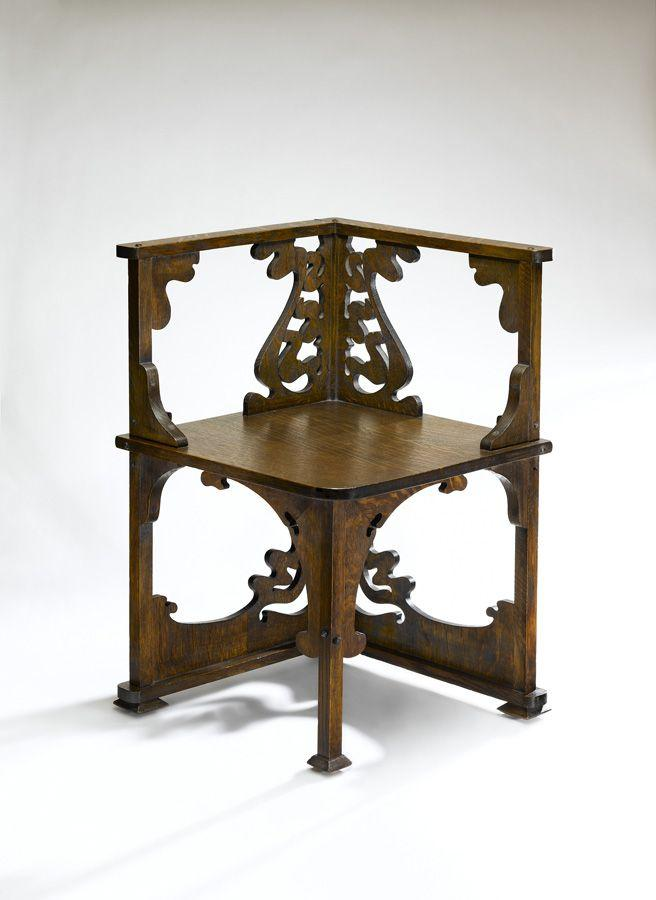
Corner chair, Rohlfs, 1898-1899, Dallas Museum of Art

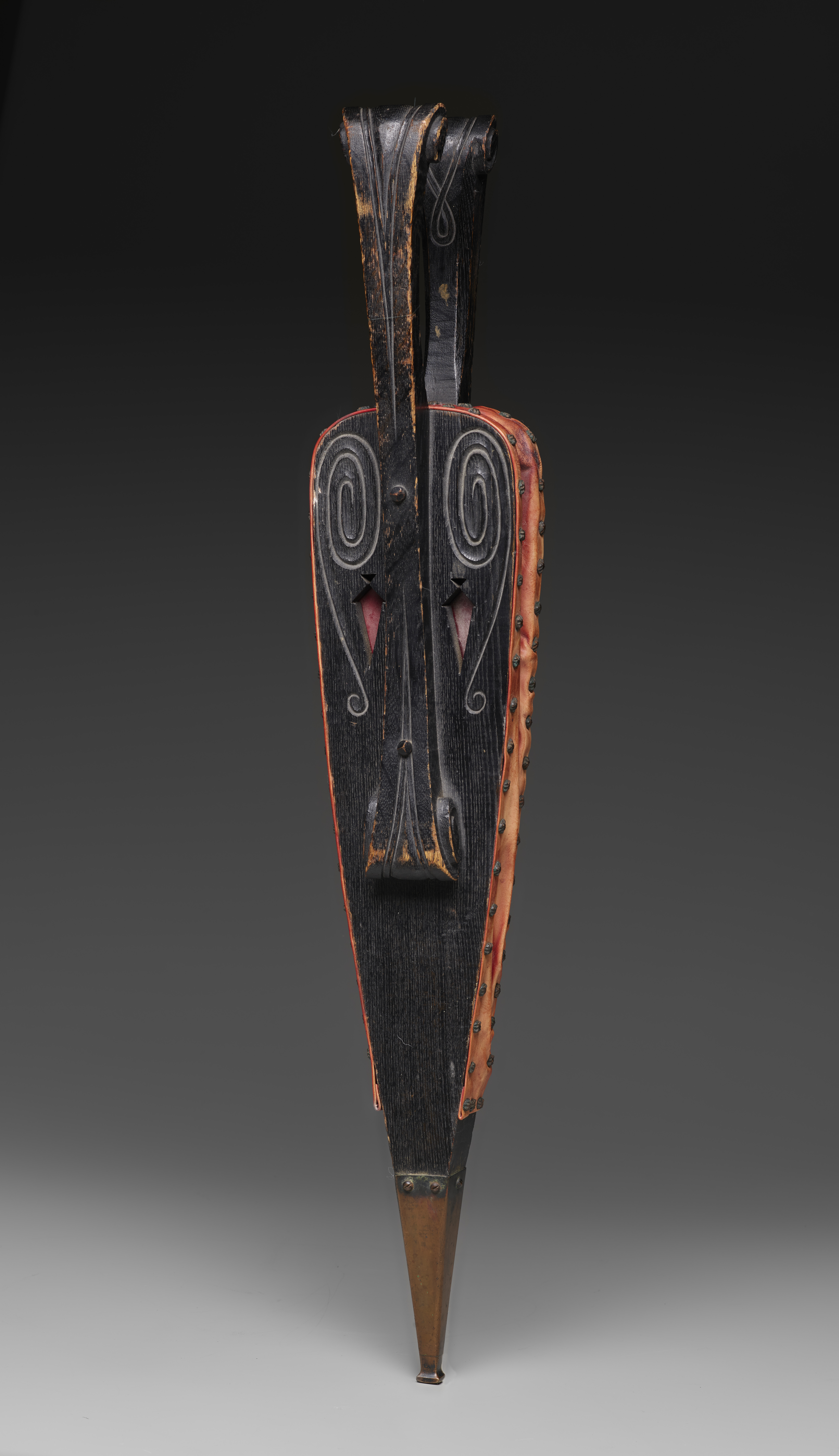
Oak and leather bellows, Rohlfs, 1899-1900, Dallas Museum of Art

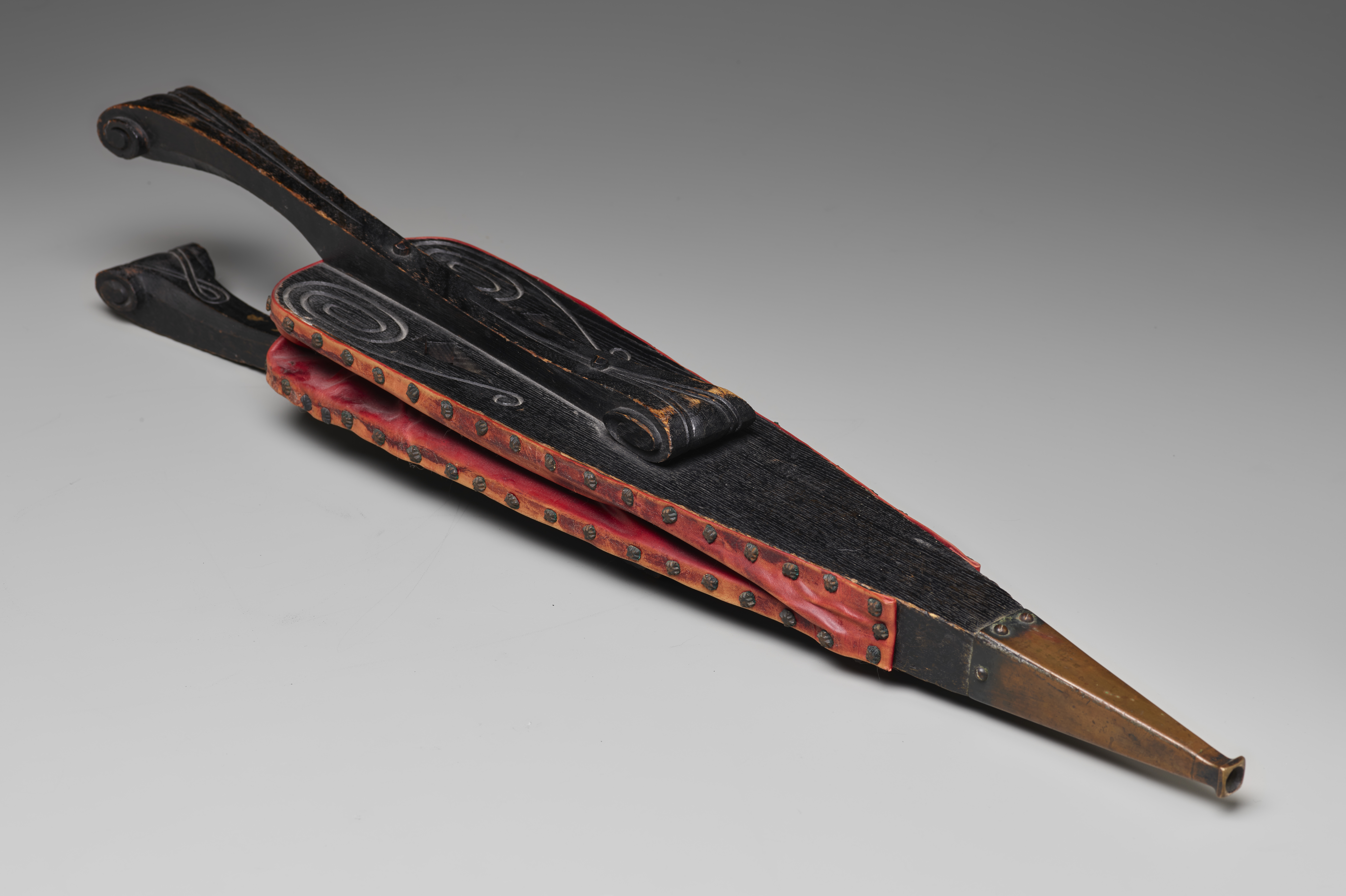
Oak and leather bellows, Rohlfs, 1899-1900, Dallas Museum of Art

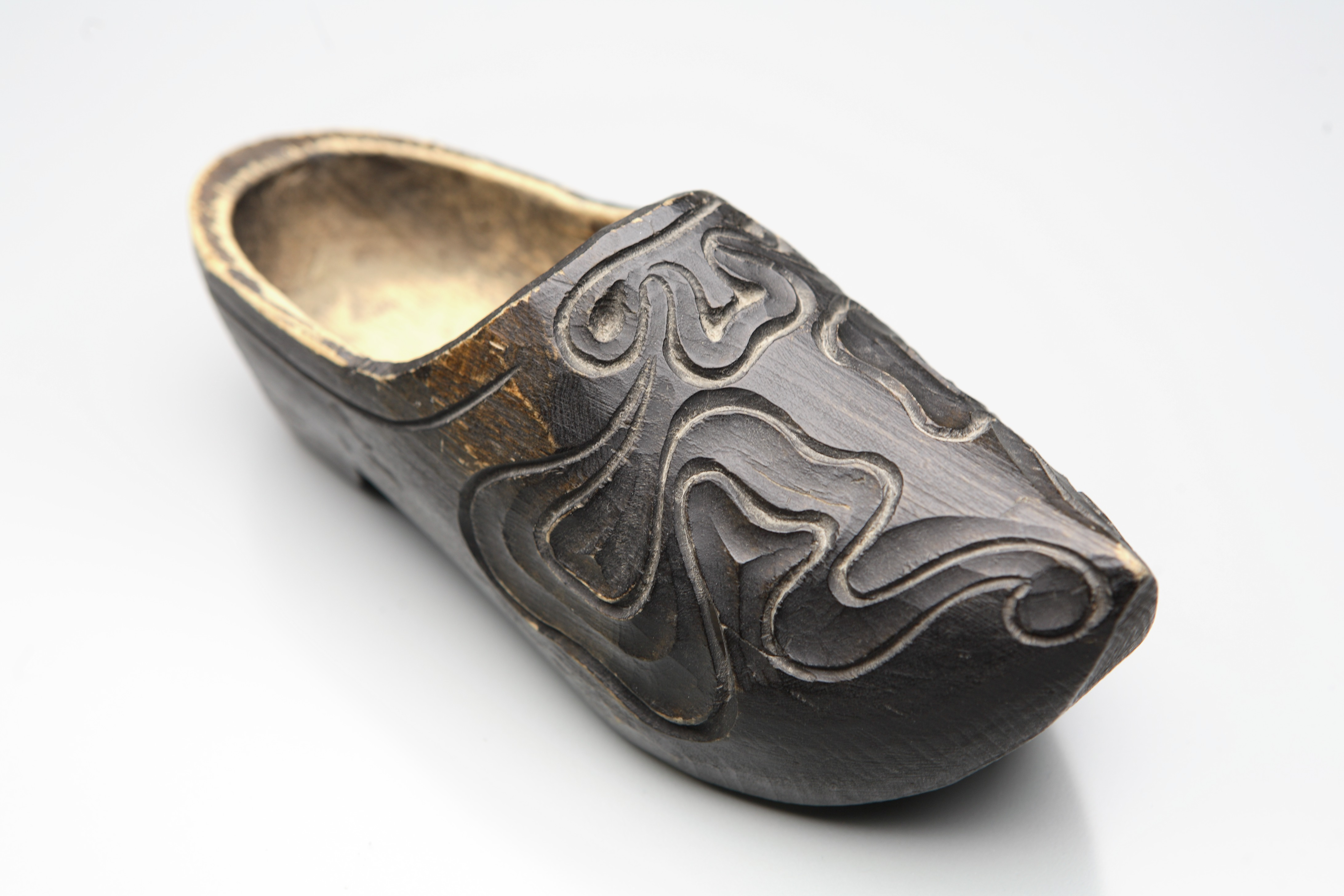
Dutch Shoe (Pencil Holder), Rohlfs, 1899-1901, Dallas Museum of Art

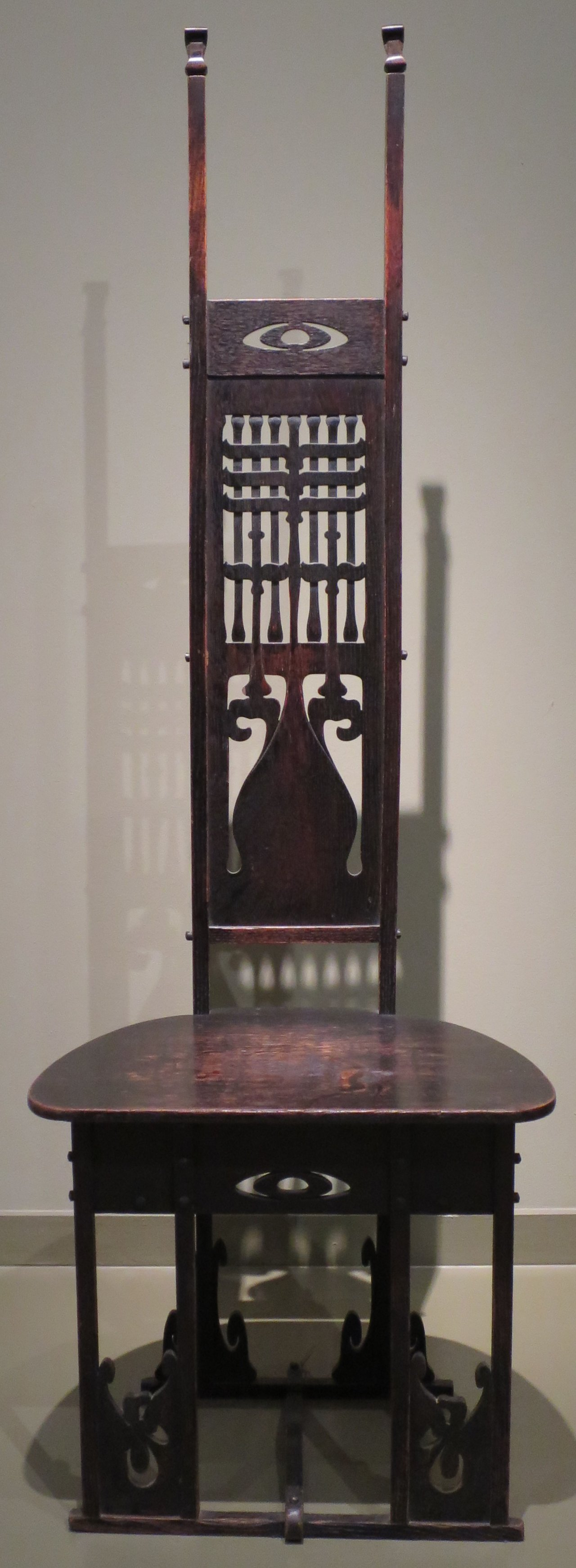
Hall chair, Rohlfs, c.1900, Los Angeles County Museum of Art

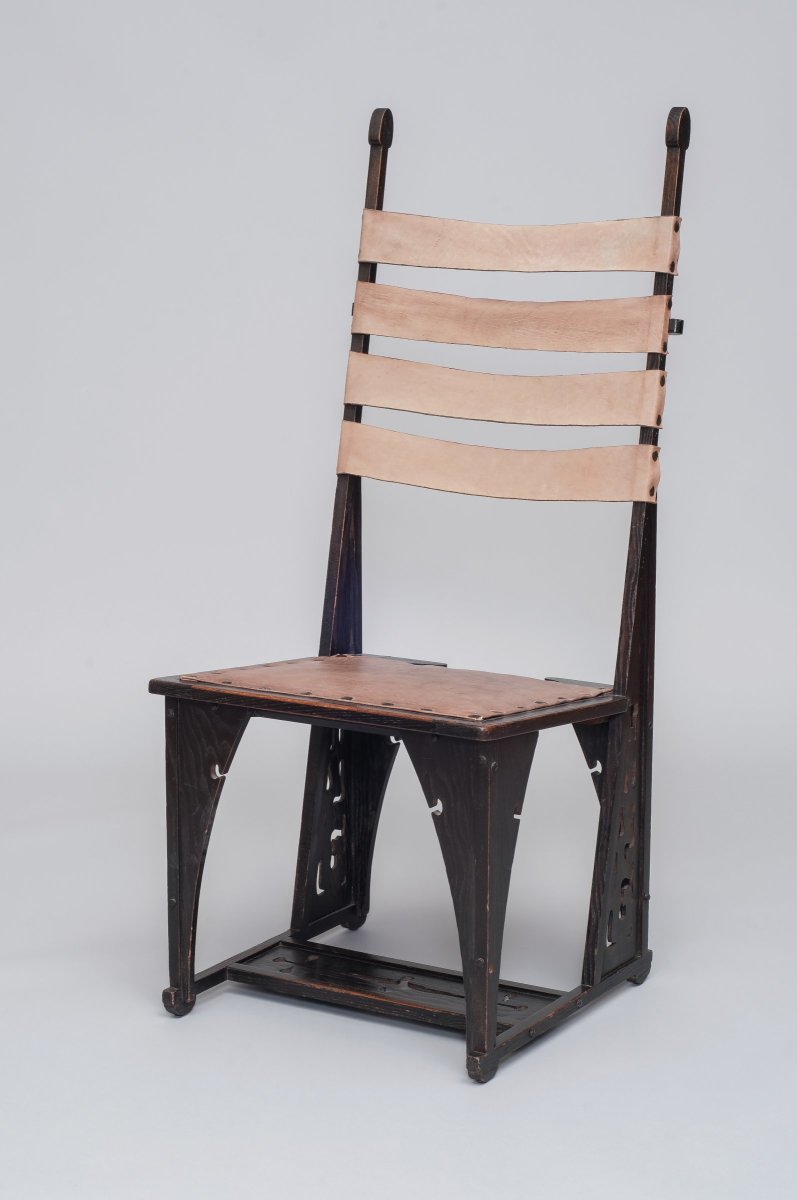
Side chair, Rohlfs, 1905, High Museum of Art

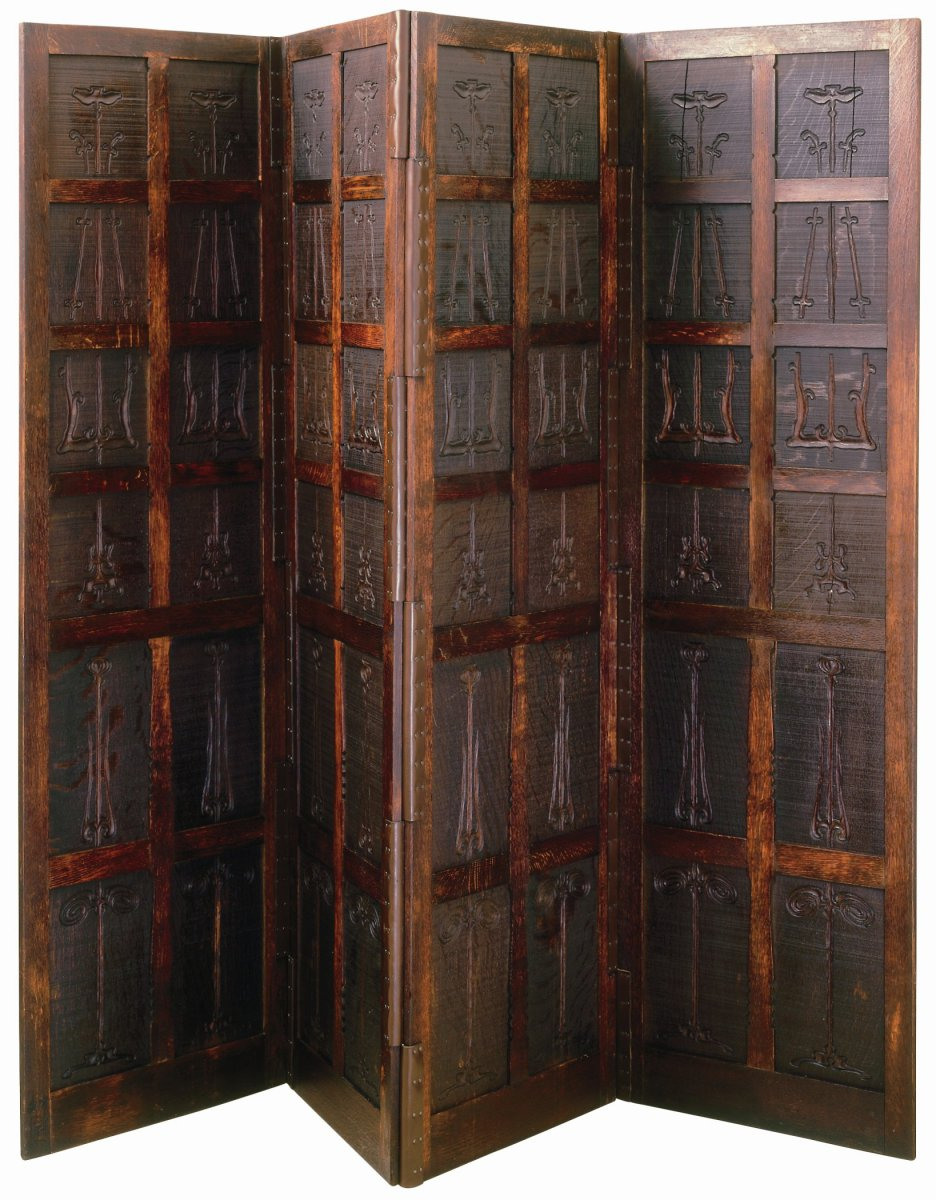
Folding screen, Rohlfs, 1900, High Museum of Art

== Books ==
Charles Rohlfs's life and work are covered in the monographic book The Artistic Furniture of Charles Rohlfs (Yale University Press, ISBN 978-0-300-13909-9), which received three book awards.

The same topics fill the book Drama in Design: The Life and Craft of Charles Rohlfs, by Michael L. James, published on the occasion of the Burchfield Art Center's exhibition "The Craftsmanship of Charles Rohlfs."
