= Anna Katharine Green =

American detective author (1846–1935)

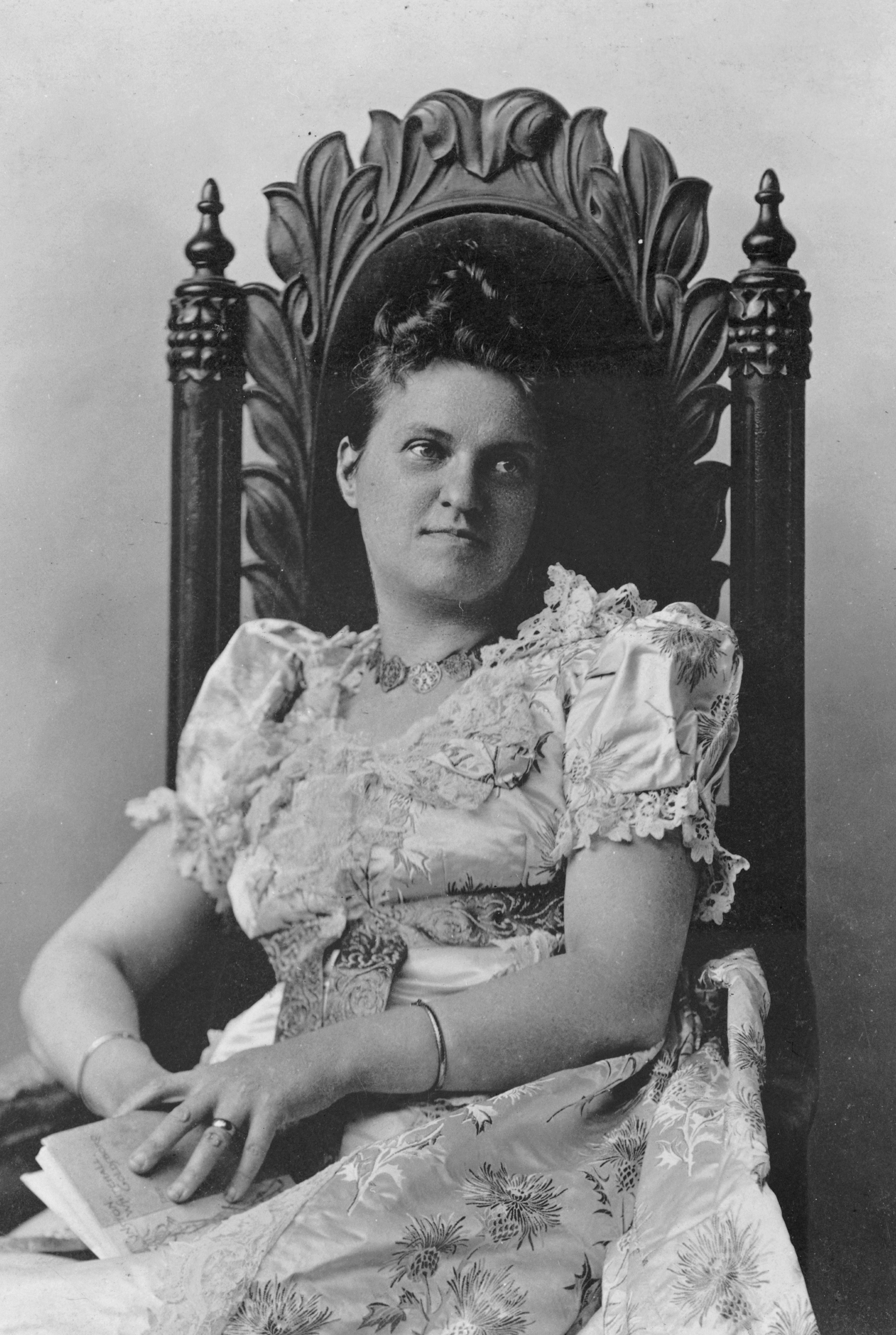
- Born: November 11, 1846; Brooklyn, New York City, U.S.
- Died: April 11, 1935 (aged 88); Buffalo, New York, U.S.
- Spouse: Charles Rohlfs (m. 1884)
- Children: 3, including Roland
- Writing career
- Genres: poetry, detective fiction

Anna Katharine Green (November 11, 1846 – April 11, 1935) was an American poet and novelist. She was one of the first authors of detective fiction in the United States and distinguished herself by writing well plotted, legally accurate stories. Green has been called "the mother of the detective novel".

== Life and work ==
Green was born in Brooklyn, New York, on November 11, 1846. She had an early ambition to write romantic verse and corresponded with Ralph Waldo Emerson. When her poetry failed to gain recognition, she produced her first and best known novel, The Leavenworth Case (1878), praised by Wilkie Collins. She became a bestselling author, eventually publishing 37 books over 40 years.

On November 25, 1884, Green married the actor and later noted furniture maker, Charles Rohlfs. Rohlfs toured in a dramatization of Green's The Leavenworth Case. After his theater career faltered, he became a furniture maker in 1897, and Green collaborated with him on some of his designs. Together they had one daughter and two sons: Rosamund Rohlfs, Roland Rohlfs, and Sterling Rohlfs.

Green died on April 11, 1935, in Buffalo, New York, at the age of 88. Her husband died the following year.

== Critical response ==
Though Green's book The Leavenworth Case is frequently cited as the first mystery written by an American woman, The Dead Letter by Seeley Regester was published earlier (1866).

In a discussion of women writers of detective fiction, scholar Ellen Higgins in 1994 chronicled the work of Green as popularizing the genre a decade before Arthur Conan Doyle brought out his first Sherlock Holmes story. "I only found out afterward that some people were a little upset with it because they don't want to hear about women competing with the master", Higgins said.

Green is credited with shaping detective fiction into its classic form, and developing the series detective. Her main character was detective Ebenezer Gryce of the New York Metropolitan Police Force, but in three novels he is assisted by the nosy society spinster Amelia Butterworth, the prototype for Miss Marple, Miss Silver and other creations. She also invented the 'girl detective': in the character of Violet Strange, a debutante with a secret life as a sleuth. Indeed, as journalist Kathy Hickman writes, Green "stamped the mystery genre with the distinctive features that would influence writers from Agatha Christie and Conan Doyle to contemporary authors of suspenseful "whodunits". In addition to creating elderly spinster and young female sleuths, Green's innovative plot devices included dead bodies in libraries, newspaper clippings as "clews", the coroner's inquest, and expert witnesses. Yale Law School once used her books to demonstrate how damaging it can be to rely on circumstantial evidence. Written in 1878, her first book, The Leavenworth Case: A Lawyer's Story, sparked a debate in the Pennsylvania State Senate over whether the book could "really have been written by a woman".

== Legacy ==
In 2002, Buffalo Literary Walking Tours began an annual series of weekend walking tours highlighting authors with local connections. Green is included along with Mark Twain, F. Scott Fitzgerald, Herman Melville, Taylor Caldwell, and others.

Green's short story "The Intangible Clue" featuring Violet Strange was adapted by Chris Harrald for the second series of BBC Radio 4's drama series The Rivals and starred Jeany Spark as Violet Strange.

== Selected works ==
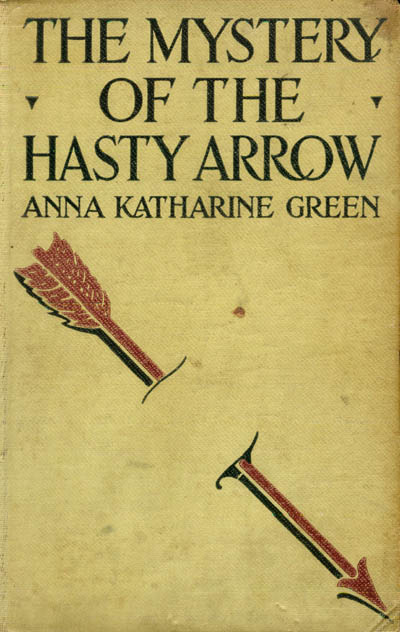
Cover of The Mystery of the Hasty Arrow by Anna Katharine Green

Detective and mystery novels

- The Leavenworth Case (1878) Mr. Gryce #1
- A Strange Disappearance (1880) Mr. Gryce #2
- The Sword of Damocles: A Story of New York Life (1881) Mr. Gryce #3
- Hand and Ring (1883) Mr. Gryce #4
- Behind Closed Doors (1888) Mr. Gryce #5
- A Matter of Millions (1891) Mr. Gryce #6
- The Doctor, His Wife, and the Clock (1895) Mr. Gryce #7. Novellette, shorter than the others
- That Affair Next Door (1897) (Amelia Butterworth I). Also Mr. Gryce #8
- Lost Man's Lane: a Second Episode in the Life of Amelia Butterworth (1898) Also Mr. Gryce #9
- The Circular Study (1900) (Amelia Butterworth III) Also Mr. Gryce #10
- One of my Sons (1901) Mr. Gryce #11
- Initials Only (color frontispiece by Arthur Keller) (1911) Mr. Gryce #12
- The Mystery of the Hasty Arrow (1917) Mr. Gryce #13
- X Y Z: A Detective Story (1883)
- The Mill Mystery (1886)
- 7 to 12: A Detective Story (1887)
- One Hour More (1887)
- Forsaken Inn (1890)
- Cynthia Wakeham's Money (1892)
- Miss Hurd: An Enigma (1894)
- Doctor Izard (1895)
- Agatha Webb (1899) Caleb Sweetwater #1
- The Filigree Ball: Being a Full and True Account of the Solution of the Mystery Concerning the Jeffrey-Moore Affair (1903)
- The Millionaire Baby (illustrations by Arthur I. Keller) (1905)
- The Chief Legatee (1906)
- The Woman in the Alcove (illustrations by Arthur I. Keller) (1906) Caleb Sweetwater #2
- The Mayor's Wife (illustrations by Alice Barber Stephens (1907)
- The House of the Whispering Pines (1910) Caleb Sweetwater #3
- Three Thousand Dollars (1910)
- Dark Hollow (1914)
- The Step on the Stair (1923)

Other novels

- The Defence of the Bride, and other Poems (1882)
- Risifi's Daughter, a Drama (1887)
- Marked "Personal", A Drama Within a Drama. (1893)
- To the Minute; Scarlet and Black: Two Tales of Life's Perplexities (1916)

Short novels and short stories

- The Old Stone House and Other Stories (1891) featuring:
  - "The Old Stone House"
  - "A Memorable Night"
  - "The Black Cross"
  - "A Mysterious Case"
  - "Shall He Wed Her?"
- A Difficult Problem: The Staircase at the Heart's Delight, and Other Stories (1900) featuring:
  - "A Difficult Problem" (1900)
  - "The Grey Madam" (1899)
  - "The Bronze Hand" (1897)
  - "Midnight in Beauchamp Row" (1895)
  - "The Staircase at the Hearts delight" (1894)
  - "The Hermit of ― Street" (1898)
- Room Number 3, and Other Detective stories (1913) featuring:
  - "Room Number 3"
  - "Midnight in Beauchamp Row"
  - "The Ruby and the Caldron"
  - "The Little Steel Coils"
  - "The Staircase at Heart's Delight"
  - "The Amethyst Box"
  - "The Grey Lady"
  - "The Thief"
  - "The House in the Mist"
- Masterpieces of Mystery (1913)
  - Short story collection. The stories are also collected in Room number 3 and A Difficult Problem.
- The Golden Slipper, and Other Problems for Violet Strange (1915) featuring:
  - "The Golden Slipper"
  - "The Second Bullet"
  - "The Intangible Clew"
  - "The Grotto Spectre"
  - "The Dreaming Lady"
  - "The House of Clocks"
  - "The Doctor, His Wife, and the Clock" *shorter version of the novella.
  - "Missing: Page Thirteen"
  - "Violet's Own"
