= Brockhoff =

Brockhoff is a surname. Notable people with the surname include:

- Belle Brockhoff (born 1993), Australian snowboarder
- David Brockhoff (1928–2011), Australian rugby union identity, a state and national representative
- Klaus Brockhoff (born 1939), German economist and organizational theorist
- Stefan Brockhoff, pseudonym that was used collectively by a group of three German co-authors of several detective novels
  - Dieter Cunz (1910–1969)
  - Richard Plant (1910–1998)
  - Oskar Seidlin (1911–1984)
