= Oskar Seidlin =

German-American academic (1911 – 1984)

- Born: Salo Oskar Koplowitz; February 17, 1911; Königshütte, Prussian Silesia; German Empire
- Died: December 11, 1984 (aged 73); Bloomington, Indiana; United States
- Resting place: Walnut Grove Cemetery, Worthington, Ohio
- Education: University of Basel
- Occupations: Professor of German, author
- Years active: 1939–1979
- Partner(s): Dieter Cunz; Hans Høgel
- Awards: Goethe Medal in Gold (1963); Friedrich Gundolf Prize (1976); Georg Dehio Prize (1983)

External image
- Portrait photograph of Oskar Seidlin as a Guggenheim Fellow, c. 1976.

Oskar Seidlin (February 17, 1911 – December 11, 1984) was a Jewish emigre from Nazi Germany first to Switzerland and then to the U.S. He taught German language and literature as a professor at Smith College, Middlebury College, Ohio State University, and Indiana University from 1939 to 1979. He authored a number of fictional and non-fictional works.

== Early years and education ==
He was born Salo Oskar Koplowitz to Johanna (1885–1943?) and Heinrich Koplowitz (1872–1938), a lumber dealer in Königshütte in the Upper Silesia Basin of Germany (now Chorzów in southwestern Poland) who served for many years as a city council alderman and was an active Zionist and member of the Jewish community. After completing secondary schooling at the humanities-focused Realgymnasium in Beuthen (now Bytom) in 1929, he enrolled for one semester at the University of Freiburg and then transferred to the recently founded University of Frankfurt, which enjoyed a reputation as Germany's most progressive university and also had the highest percentage of Jewish students and professors. Here he was joined by his sister Ruth, five years his senior, and attended courses on German literature (taught by Wolfgang Pfeiffer-Belli, Julius Schwietering, Franz Schultz, Max Herrmann), French literature, philosophy (Paul Tillich), and history. He also audited courses in sociology (Theodor Adorno, Norbert Elias, Karl Mannheim). In a seminar on baroque literature taught by Martin Sommerfeld, he made the acquaintance of the gay Jewish student Richard Plaut, beginning a friendship they maintained when they later emigrated to Switzerland and the U.S. In the fall of 1930, he transferred with Plaut for one semester to the University of Berlin, where they became acquainted with the Kattowitz editor Franz Goldstein and through him with Klaus Mann, both of whom were infatuated with Koplowitz. Upon returning to Frankfurt in 1931, he met the history student Dieter Cunz, who became his lifetime partner. He also met the students Wilhelm Rey (1911–2007) and Wilhelm Emrich (1909–1998) who became lifelong friends and eventually colleagues, despite their later accommodation with the Nazi regime; Rey served in the Wehrmacht, and Emrich authored a doctrinaire anti-Semitic essay in 1943. In the closing years of the Weimar Republic, Koplowitz, Cunz, Plaut, Rey, and Emrich sympathized with Frankfurt's leftist student political group that was increasingly on the defensive when the growing Nazi Students League felt emboldened to disrupt courses taught by Jewish professors, including Sommerfeld. Koplowitz's primary interest was theater directing, and in 1932 he mounted a production of John Gay's The Beggar's Opera with student friends.

== Studies in Switzerland ==
In February 1933, following Hitler's rise to power, Plaut left Germany for Switzerland, where he was joined in April by Koplowitz. They initially regarded the move as a temporary transfer, not a permanent emigration, and expected to return to Frankfurt once the Nazis had been turned out of office. While Plaut and Koplowitz enrolled at the University of Basel in 1933, Cunz, a gentile, remained in Frankfurt but after completing his Ph.D. in 1934 also relocated to Switzerland. Hard pressed financially and constrained in employment by their Swiss student visas, Koplowitz and Plaut relied on writing under pseudonyms as their primary source of income. Together with Cunz, they coauthored three detective novels under the collective pen name Stefan Brockhoff that were published in Nazi Germany. Contemporaries of Friedrich Glauser, Koplowitz et al. are recognized as pioneers of the Swiss crime story genre (distinguished by setting and the occasional use of Helvetisms).

In 1936, Koplowitz completed a Ph.D. with a summa cum laude dissertation on the Naturalistic theater work of the leftist German Jewish director Otto Brahm, written under the supervision first of Franz Zinkernagel, who died in 1935, and then Eduard Hoffmann-Krayer. He then relocated with Cunz to Lausanne, where he pursued postgraduate studies in French language and literature. One year later Plaut also finished his doctorate. Since their student visas were no longer extended following the completion of the Ph.D., Plaut and Koplowitz were under increasing pressure to leave Switzerland. In 1937, Koplowitz used the pen name Oskar Seidlin (possibly devised because of its similarity both to his mother's maiden name, Seidler, and to Hölderlin) for his young readers' tale Pedronis muss geholfen werden! A collection of his poems entitled Mein Bilderbuch was published under the same nom de plume in 1938. Together with Plaut, Koplowitz and Cunz decided to emigrate to the U.S.

== Emigration to the U.S. ==
In 1938, the three left Switzerland for New York, where within a year their paths diverged. Koplowitz worked briefly as a dishwasher before finding employment as an amanuensis for the emigres Thomas Mann and Erika Mann. In 1939, he obtained a lecturership in German language and literature at Smith College in Northampton, Massachusetts, where he advanced to an assistant professorship in 1941. Cunz was awarded a grant to conduct historical research in Maryland, and in 1939 he received a teaching appointment at the University of Maryland, where he rose through the ranks and long chaired the Department of German. Plaut remained in New York City, where he officially changed his name to Plant and worked for the emigre Klaus Mann. Koplowitz would officially change his name to Seidlin in 1943, when he was naturalized as a U.S. citizen. With Plant, he coauthored S.O.S. Geneva, a young readers' book with a cosmopolitan and pacifistic theme that was published in English in October 1939, just before the outbreak of World War II. Under the title Der goldene Apfel, an abridged and annotated version of Seidlin's Pedronis muss geholfen werden! was published in 1942 for use in German language instruction. Between 1942 and 1946, he was granted an extended wartime leave from his teaching position at Smith to serve with the "Ritchie Boys" (Military Intelligence Service). A second lieutenant, he served under Hans Habe in Germany, and he coauthored the screenplay of Death Mills (Die Todesmühlen), a documentary film about Nazi concentration camps that was directed by Billy Wilder. While his father died in 1938 and his sister Ruth was imprisoned at hard labor from 1935 to 1940 for political activities before emigrating first to the Shanghai Ghetto and then to Australia, his mother was killed in Auschwitz, probably in 1943. In 1946, Seidlin recorded his religion as Lutheran on a personnel information form.

== Ohio State University ==
Following World War II, Seidlin made the acquaintance of Bernhard Blume while teaching at the German Summer School of Middlebury College in Vermont. Also an emigre who had left Nazi Germany in 1936, Blume chaired the Department of German at Ohio State University beginning in 1945, and he offered Seidlin an assistant professorship there. Seidlin moved to Columbus in the autumn of 1946, and he solidified his credentials with an essay on Goethe's Faust that appeared in the Publications of the Modern Language Association (1947). This signaled a growing shift in Seidlin's scholarly focus from the politically and socially informed studies of his Frankfurt and Basel years to the canonical works of Weimar Classicism and German Romanticism favored in Germanistics during the Cold War period. He collaborated on An Outline‑History of German Literature (1948) with the prominent Swiss-American comparatist Werner Paul Friederich (1905–1993), professor at the University of North Carolina, and Philip Allison Shelley (1907–1974), head of the German Department at Pennsylvania State University. In rapid order, Seidlin was promoted to an associate professorship in 1948 and to a full professorship in 1950. He revisited the subject of his doctoral dissertation by editing the correspondence of Otto Brahm with Arthur Schnitzler (1953). To escape the summer heat in Columbus, Seidlin regularly taught at the Middlebury Summer School up to 1957, and he often spent the remaining summer weeks with Cunz and Plant on holiday at the beach of Manomet, Massachusetts, where they hobnobbed with the vacationing Hannah Arendt. In the following years, Seidlin's political outlook shifted strongly to the right under the influence of Arendt's concept of totalitarianism yoking together Nazism and Stalinism.

Starting in 1954, Seidlin traveled frequently to West Germany to give guest lectures. In 1957, following Blume's departure from Ohio State for a position at Harvard University, Cunz was tapped to chair the German Department in Columbus. He and Seidlin contracted to have a house built in the suburb Worthington that was completed in 1958, and in 1961 both were relieved by the addition of central air conditioning. These were the happiest and most productive years in Seidlin's career. In quick succession, he published Essays in German and Comparative Literature (1961), followed by Von Goethe zu Thomas Mann. Zwölf Versuche (1963) and Versuche über Eichendorff (1965), which he personally regarded as his most heartfelt work, in part because he and Eichendorff shared a Silesian upbringing. He also authored the essay collection Klassische und moderne Klassiker. Goethe, Brentano, Eichendorff, Gerhart Hauptmann, Thomas Mann (1972). In 1966, he was named a Regents' Professor at Ohio State University, and he served on the Advisory Council of Princeton University for several terms.

== The final years ==
Seidlin was alarmed by the leftist turn of literary studies in West Germany and the U.S. in the late 1960s and 1970s and vehemently declined professorships proffered by the University of Mainz in 1966 and LMU Munich in 1968 because of widespread student unrest at West German universities, which he found reminiscent of the events one generation earlier, leading up to totalitarian dictatorship in Nazi Germany. He was criticized by some within the profession as an ivory tower conservative at pains to conceal both his gay and Jewish identities, and he resigned from the Modern Language Association, regarding it as overly politicized. Following the death of Cunz at age 58 in 1969, Seidlin felt isolated in the Worthington house they had shared and found himself increasingly at odds with the chair of the German Department at Ohio State University, Cunz's successor. In 1972, he accepted an offer from Indiana University, where he taught as Distinguished Professor of Germanic languages and literatures until his retirement in May 1979. He published a second, expanded edition of the Brahm-Schnitzler correspondence, and he also reissued his doctoral dissertation on Brahm in a new printing. His final book publication was the essay collection Von erwachendem Bewusstsein und vom Sündenfall. Brentano, Schiller, Kleist, Goethe (1979).

A selection of Seidlin's correspondence with Wilhelm Rey, who taught alongside Seidlin at Ohio State University in 1947–48, was published posthumously under the title "Bete für mich, mein Lieber..." in 2001. Written between 1947 and 1984, these letters document that Seidlin was increasingly tormented by self-doubts about his teaching performance and needed the tranquilizers Miltown and Valium to enter the classroom. Deeply depressed by the passing of Dieter Cunz, he chose to undergo electroshock treatment in 1970. In 1972, he found a new partner in the 35-year-old Hans Høgel, whom he visited regularly in Denmark and with whom he vacationed in the Great Smoky Mountains and the Caribbean. In 1982, he moved into the newly built Indiana University Retirement Community, an independent senior living facility. A heavy smoker, he suffered a heart attack in June 1984 and was diagnosed with a malignant tumor at the beginning of October; he died nine weeks later and his body was buried at the Walnut Grove Cemetery in Worthington.

== Achievements and awards ==
Internationally acclaimed for his adeptness at close reading and text-immanent literary interpretation, Seidlin lectured widely in the U.S. and West Germany. His broadly informed and thorough essays cunningly revealed how seemingly minor details and apparent coincidences meld seamlessly into the higher order of a literary artwork, and his writing aspired to an expository virtuosity that matched the dignified elegance of his public presentations. He wrote over 200 contributions to scholarly journals. In 1958, he chaired the Germanic Section of the Modern Language Association. In the summer of 1959, he was named Ford Professor-in-Residence at the Free University of Berlin. In 1961, he received the Eichendorff Medal conferred by the Eichendorff Museum in Wangen im Allgäu. He was twice the recipient of Guggenheim Fellowships, in 1962 and 1976. In 1963, the Goethe Institute awarded him the Goethe Medal in Gold for meritorious work in the service of German culture in a foreign country. In 1965, he was elected first vice-president of the Modern Language Association. In 1968, he was conferred an honorary doctorate by the University of Michigan and awarded the Prize for Germanic Studies Abroad by the Deutsche Akademie für Sprache und Dichtung. In 1973, he was elected to the Göttingen Academy of Sciences as a corresponding member. In 1974, he received the Eichendorff Medal of the Eichendorff Society. In 1975, he received the Culture Prize of Upper Silesia awarded by the state of North Rhine-Westphalia and on this occasion delivered an address describing his Silesian boyhood, including the everyday anti-Semitism he had experienced there. On his sixty-fifth birthday in 1976, he was honored with a Festschrift. That year, he also received the Friedrich Gundolf Prize for Conveying German Culture Abroad from the Deutsche Akademie für Sprache und Dichtung. In 1983, he was awarded the Georg Dehio Prize for Cultural and Intellectual History.

== Books ==
- Stefan Brockhoff (i.e., Oskar Koplowitz, Dieter Cunz, and Richard Plaut). 1935. Schuß auf die Bühne. Detektiv-Roman. Goldmanns Detektiv-Romane. Leipzig: Wilhelm Goldmann. 244 pages. 2nd ed.: Schuß auf die Bühne. Kriminal-Roman. Goldmanns Kriminal-Romane, no. 79. Munich: Wilhelm Goldmann, 1965. 214 pages.
- Stefan Brockhoff (i.e., Oskar Koplowitz, Dieter Cunz, and Richard Plaut). 1936. Musik im Totengässlein. Detektiv-Roman. Goldmanns Roman-Bibliothek, no. 29. Leipzig: Wilhelm Goldmann. 217 pages. 2nd ed.: Musik im Totengässlein. Kriminal-Roman. Goldmanns Kriminal-Romane, no. 69. Munich: Wilhelm Goldmann, 1965. 203 pages. 3rd ed.: Musik im Totengässlein. Detektiv-Roman, ed. Paul Ott and Kurt Stadelmann. Schweizer Texte, Neue Folge, no. 25. Zurich: Chronos, 2007. 205 pages.
- Oskar Koplowitz. 1936. Otto Brahm als Theaterkritiker. Mit Berücksichtigung seiner literarhistorischen Arbeiten. Doctoral dissertation, University of Basel. Zurich: Max Niehans. viii + 218 pages.
  - Oskar Seidlin. 1978. Der Theaterkritiker Otto Brahm. Bonn: Bouvier. viii + 216 pages.
- Stefan Brockhoff (i.e., Oskar Koplowitz, Dieter Cunz, and Richard Plaut). 1937. Drei Kioske am See. Goldmanns Roman-Bibliothek. Leipzig: Wilhelm Goldmann. 217 pages. 2nd ed.: Drei Kioske am See. Kriminal-Roman. Goldmanns Kriminal-Romane, no. 73. Munich: Wilhelm Goldmann, 1964. 204 pages.
- Oskar Seidlin. 1937. Pedronis muss geholfen werden! Eine Erzählung für die Jugend, with illustrations by Felix Hoffmann. Aarau: H. R. Sauerländer. 232 pages.
  - Oskar Seidlin. 1942. Der goldene Apfel. Eine Erzählung für die Jugend, abridged ed. with questions, exercises, and vocabulary by Ann Elizabeth Mensel. New York: F. S. Crofts. x + 189 pages. London: George G. Harrap, 1948. x + 189 pages.
  - Oskar Seidlin. 1943. Green Wagons, trans. Senta Jonas Rypins and illustrations by Barbara Cooney. Boston: Houghton Mifflin. 130 pages. Special ed.: Cadmus Books. Eau Claire: E. M. Hale, 1943. 130 pages.
  - Oskar Seidlin. 1969. Waldwyl und die Theaterleute. Kleine Bücherei für schreib-leseschwache Kinder (Legastheniker). Aarau: H. R. Sauerländer. 47 pages.
- Oskar Seidlin. 1938. Mein Bilderbuch. Gedichte. Zurich: Oprecht. 72 pages.
- Oskar Seidlin and Richard Plaut. [1939]. S.O.S. Genf. Ein Friedensbuch für Kinder, with 40 illustrations by Susel Bischoff. Zurich: Humanitas. 256 pages.
  - Oskar Seidlin and Richard Plant. 1939. S.O.S. Geneva, with 29 illustrations by William Pène du Bois. Adapted into English by Ralph Manheim. New York: Viking Press. 246 pages.
- Werner Paul Friedrich, Oskar Seidlin, and Philip Allison Shelley. 1948. An Outline‑History of German Literature. College Outline Series, no. 65. New York: Barnes & Noble. 396 pages. 2nd rev. ed. 1963. viii + 356 pages.
  - Werner Paul Friedrich, Oskar Seidlin, and Philip Allison Shelley. 1961. Historia de la literatura alemana, trans. Aníbal Leal. México: Hermes. 321 pages.
- Oskar Seidlin, ed. 1953. Der Briefwechsel Arthur Schnitzler—Otto Brahm. Berlin: Gesellschaft für Theatergeschichte. 266 pages.
  - Oskar Seidlin, ed. 1975. Briefwechsel Arthur Schnitzler—Otto Brahm. Tübingen: Max Niemeyer. 362 pages.
- Stefan Brockhoff (i.e., Oskar Seidlin, Dieter Cunz, and Richard Plant). 1955. Begegnung in Zermatt. Kriminal-Roman. Goldmanns Taschen-Krimi, no. 61. Munich: Goldmann, 1955. 182 pages.
- Oskar Seidlin. 1961. Essays in German and Comparative Literature. Chapel Hill: University of North Carolina Press. 254 pages. 2nd ed., New York: Johnson Reprint, 1966. 254 pages.
- Oskar Seidlin. 1963. Von Goethe zu Thomas Mann. Zwölf Versuche. Kleine Vandenhoeck-Reihe, no. 1705. Göttingen: Vandenhoeck & Ruprecht. 246 pages. 2nd, rev. ed., Göttingen: Vandenhoeck & Ruprecht, 1969. 246 pages.
- Oskar Seidlin. 1965. Versuche über Eichendorff. Göttingen: Vandenhoeck & Ruprecht. 303 pages. 2nd printing, 1978. 3rd printing, 1985.
- Oskar Seidlin. 1972. Klassische und moderne Klassiker. Goethe, Brentano, Eichendorff, Gerhart Hauptmann, Thomas Mann. Göttingen: Vandenhoeck & Ruprecht. 154 pages.
- Oskar Seidlin. 1979. Von erwachendem Bewusstsein und vom Sündenfall. Brentano, Schiller, Kleist, Goethe. Stuttgart: E. Klett–J. G. Cotta. 171 pages.

== Bibliography ==
- "Seidlin, Oskar". In Archiv Bibliographia Judaica, ed., Lexikon deutsch-jüdischer Autoren, vol. 19: Sand–Stri, pp. 212–218. Berlin: de Gruyter, 2012.
- "Seidlin, Oskar". In Franz Heiduk, Oberschlesisches Literatur-Lexikon, part 3, pp. 95–96. Heidelberg: Palatina, 2000.
- Peter Boerner, "Oskar Seidlin". In John M. Spalek et al., eds, Deutschsprachige Exilliteratur seit 1933, vol. 3: USA, supplement 1, pp. 307–315. Berlin: Walter de Gruyter, 2010.
- "Seidlin, Oskar". In Werner Röder and Herbert A. Strauss, eds., International Biographical Dictionary of Central European Emigrés 1933–1945, vol. 2, part 2, p. 1071. Munich: Saur, 1983.
