= Gregor Thum =

German-American historian

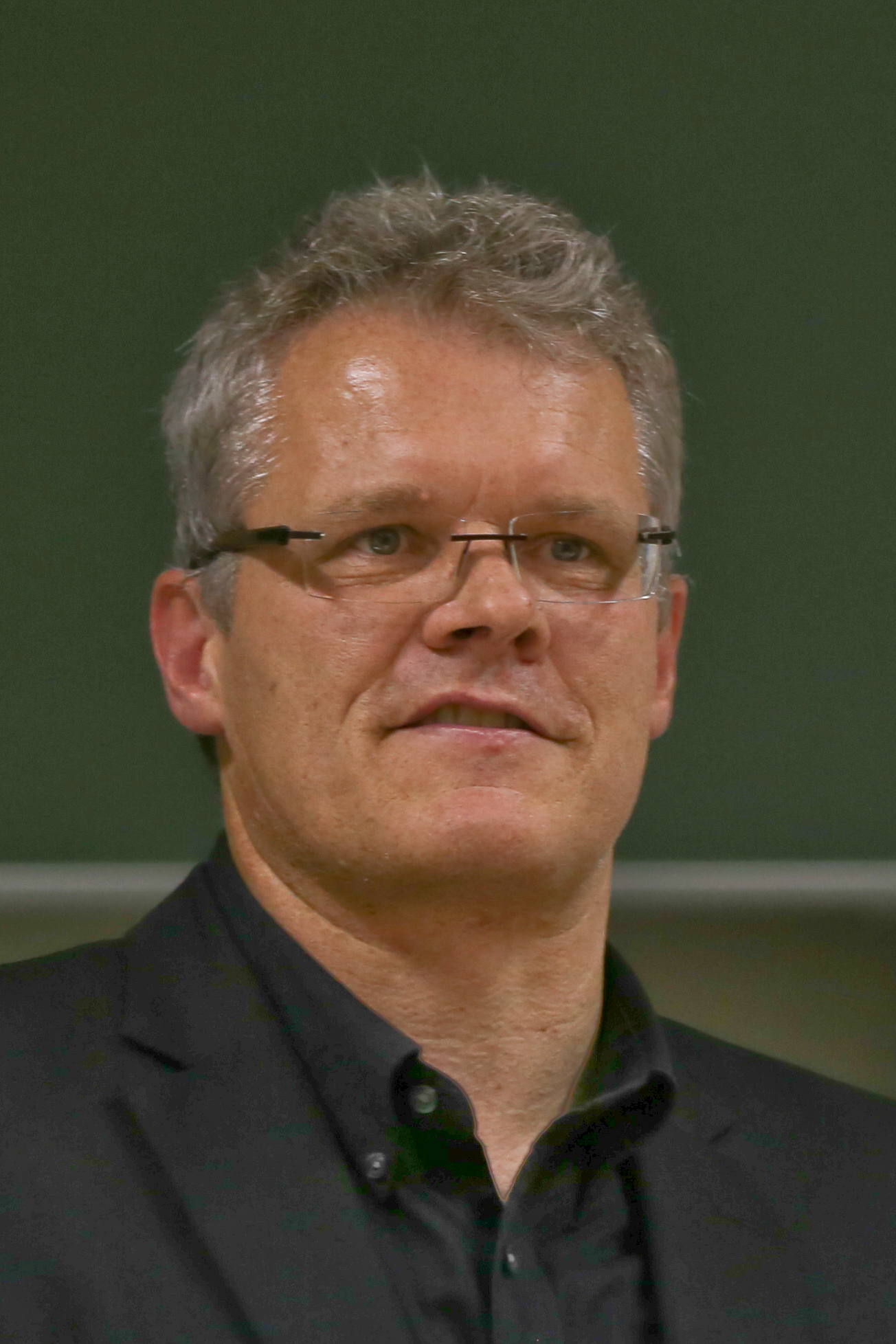
- Portrait of Thum during a conference at MLU, 2016
- Born: 1967 (age 58–59); Munich, Bavaria, West Germany
- Title: Ambassador of Wrocław
- Awards: Georg Dehio Book Prize

Academic background
- Education: European University Viadrina
- Thesis: Die fremde Stadt: Breslau nach 1945 (2002)

Academic work
- Discipline: History
- Sub-discipline: European history
- Main interests: 19th–20th century Central European history
- Website: Gregor Thum publications indexed by Google Scholar

Gregor Thum (born 1967) is a German-American historian of Central and Eastern Europe from Munich, Bavaria.

== Biography ==
From 1988 through to 1995, Thum studied history and Slavic studies at the Free University of Berlin. From 1995 to 2001, he was a lecturer at professor Karl Schlögel's chair for East European history at Viadrina European University in Frankfurt an der Oder. There, he worked on a PhD thesis concerning the transformation of German Breslau into Polish Wrocław from 1945 onward. Completed in 2002 and published as a book the following year, the thesis achieved notable success for a historical monograph. Thum received several awards in both Germany and Poland. Thum was a German Academic Exchange Service (DAAD) visiting assistant professor at the University of Pittsburgh (2003–2008) and a DAAD associate professor at the University of Washington (2010–2011). From 2008 to 2010, he was a Junior Fellow at the University of Freiburg's Institute for Advanced Studies. Since 2012, he has been an assistant professor at the University of Pittsburgh. Since 2014, he has served as the History Department's Director of Graduate Studies. He is currently working on a research project titled "Mastering the East. The German Frontier from 1800 to the Present".

In 2007 Thum was awarded the honorary title "Ambassador of Wrocław" by the local edition of Gazeta Wyborcza, prevailing over prominent nominees including Lech Janerka, Marek Krajewski, Maciej Łagiewski, Jan Miodek, and Bogdan Zdrojewski.

== Bibliography ==
- 1998 (ed. with Katharina Kucher, Karl Schlögel, Bernhard Suchy): Chronik russischen Lebens in Deutschland, 1918–1941 [A Chronicle of Russian Life in Germany, 1918–1941]. Berlin: Akademie Verlag, ISBN 3-050-03297-9
- 2003: Die fremde Stadt. Breslau nach 1945, Berlin: Siedler, ISBN 978-3-88680-795-6 (Polish ed. Obce miasto: Wrocław 1945 i potem, Wrocław: Via Nova; English ed.: Uprooted: How Breslau became Wroclaw, Princeton University Press, 2011, ISBN 978-0-691-14024-7)
- 2006 (ed.): Traumland Osten. Deutsche Bilder vom östlichen Europa im 20. Jahrhundert [Dreamland East. German Images of Eastern Europe in the 20th century], Göttingen: Vandenhoeck & Ruprecht, ISBN 3-525-36295-1
- 2012 (ed. with Maurus Reinkowski): Helpless Imperialists. Imperial Failure, Fear, and Radicalization, Göttingen: Vandenhoeck & Ruprecht, ISBN 978-3525310441
- 2013 (ed. with Katharina Kucher, Sören Urbansky): Stille Revolutionen. Die Neuformierung der Welt seit 1989, Frankfurt a.M.: Campus, ISBN 978-3593398518
