= Bernhard Blume =

Bernhard Blume may refer to:

- Bernhard Blume (writer) (1901–1978), German American author and professor
- Bernhard Blume (photographer) (1937–2011), German art photographer
