= Richard Plant (writer) =

German-American academic (1910 – 1998)

External image
- Richard Plant in 1989, holding a 1932 photo of himself. Portrait photograph by Robert Giard.

Richard Plant (July 22, 1910 – March 10, 1998) was a gay Jewish emigre from Nazi Germany, first to Switzerland and then to the U.S., who became a professor at the City College of New York, where he taught German language and literature from 1947 to 1973. He authored an opera scenario as well a number of fictional and non-fictional works, notably The Pink Triangle: The Nazi War Against Homosexuals (1986).

== The early years in Frankfurt (1910–1933) ==
Richard Plant was born Richard Plaut in Frankfurt am Main to Meta and Theodor Plaut, a practicing physician who served for many years as a Social Democratic city council alderman. While his parents were religiously non-observant and largely assimilated, his paternal grandfather, Dr. Rudolf Plaut, was a Reform rabbi. (Note: Of Sephardic heritage, the Plaut family lived in Hesse for centuries. Plant's paternal grandfather Ruben Plaut (1843–1914), who Germanized his first name to Rudolf, was born in the village of Mackenzell (incorporated within Hünfeld since 1971). He studied philosophy and Oriental languages (i.e., Hebrew) at Leipzig University, where he completed a Ph.D. in 1867 with a dissertation on Flavius Josephus and the bible. He served as a rabbi first in Schwersenz, received additional rabbinical training in Hamburg and Mainz, and then served in Karlsbad, where his skill as a pulpit orator impressed Baroness Louise von Rothschild, who in 1883 brought him to Frankfurt with its centuries-old Jewish tradition. With his wife Rosa (1851–1900), he fathered fourteen children before she suffered a stroke in 1893; he also had numerous children out of wedlock. See Paul Arnsberg, Die Geschichte der Frankfurter Juden seit der Französischen Revolution, vol. 3 (Darmstadt: E. Roether, 1983), pp. 347–348. Born in Karlsbad, Plant's father Theodor Plaut (1874–1938), whose wife Meta née Plaut (1875-1934) was his first cousin once removed (i.e., they shared one great-grandparent), studied medicine at the Friedrich Wilhelm University of Berlin, the University of Würzburg, the University of Freiburg, and the Ludwig-Maximilians-Universität München, where he received his approbation (physician's license) in 1897. He then continued his studies in residency at the university clinics Berlin Charité, the University Hospital of Giessen and Marburg, and the University Hospital of Zurich prior to returning to Frankfurt in 1899 and setting up his own practice in Frankfurt's Opera quarter, specializing in digestive health.) Despite his parents' secular outlook, he was briefly involved as a 16-year-old with Kadimah, a Zionist youth organization, where he experienced his first sexual encounters. His godfather was Kurt Goldstein, a professor of neurology at the recently founded University of Frankfurt, which had a reputation as Germany's most left-wing university and also had the highest percentage of Jewish students and professors of any German university. Goldstein, a Gestalt therapist, helped the youngster manage his stuttering to a large extent and also counseled his parents to accept his sexual orientation.

Following his secondary schooling at Frankfurt's noted Goethe Gymnasium, where a classmate was the later émigré composer Bernhard Heiden, Plaut enrolled in 1929 at the University of Frankfurt, where he studied German literature and European history. In a seminar on baroque literature taught by Martin Sommerfeld, he made the acquaintance of Oskar Koplowitz, beginning a friendship they maintained when they later emigrated from Germany to Switzerland and the U.S. He attended courses taught by the philosopher and Protestant theologian Paul Tillich and through him became acquainted with the sociologists Theodor Adorno and Norbert Elias. Literature, theater, and the cinema were his primary interests, and his earliest publications, film reviews edited by Siegfried Kracauer, appeared in the left-liberal daily Frankfurter Rundschau. He also appeared on stage as an extra in Schauspielhaus productions of plays by Fritz von Unruh and Carl Zuckmayer. In the fall of 1930, Plaut briefly transferred to the University of Berlin, where in addition to continuing his studies for one semester he wrote cultural commentaries for various newspapers and worked as an extra in UFA films, including The Threepenny Opera. In Berlin he was introduced to Klaus Mann, whose openly gay novel Der fromme Tanz (1925) he greatly admired. Returning to the University of Frankfurt in 1931, he remained active as a journalist and theater extra at a time when courses taught by Jewish professors, including Sommerfeld, were increasingly disrupted by the growing Nazi Students League. Plant hoped to write a doctoral dissertation on the formula novelist Hedwig Courths-Mahler, but when Sommerfeld rejected this thesis proposal, he decided to transfer again, this time to Basel.

== Studies in Switzerland (1933–1938) ==
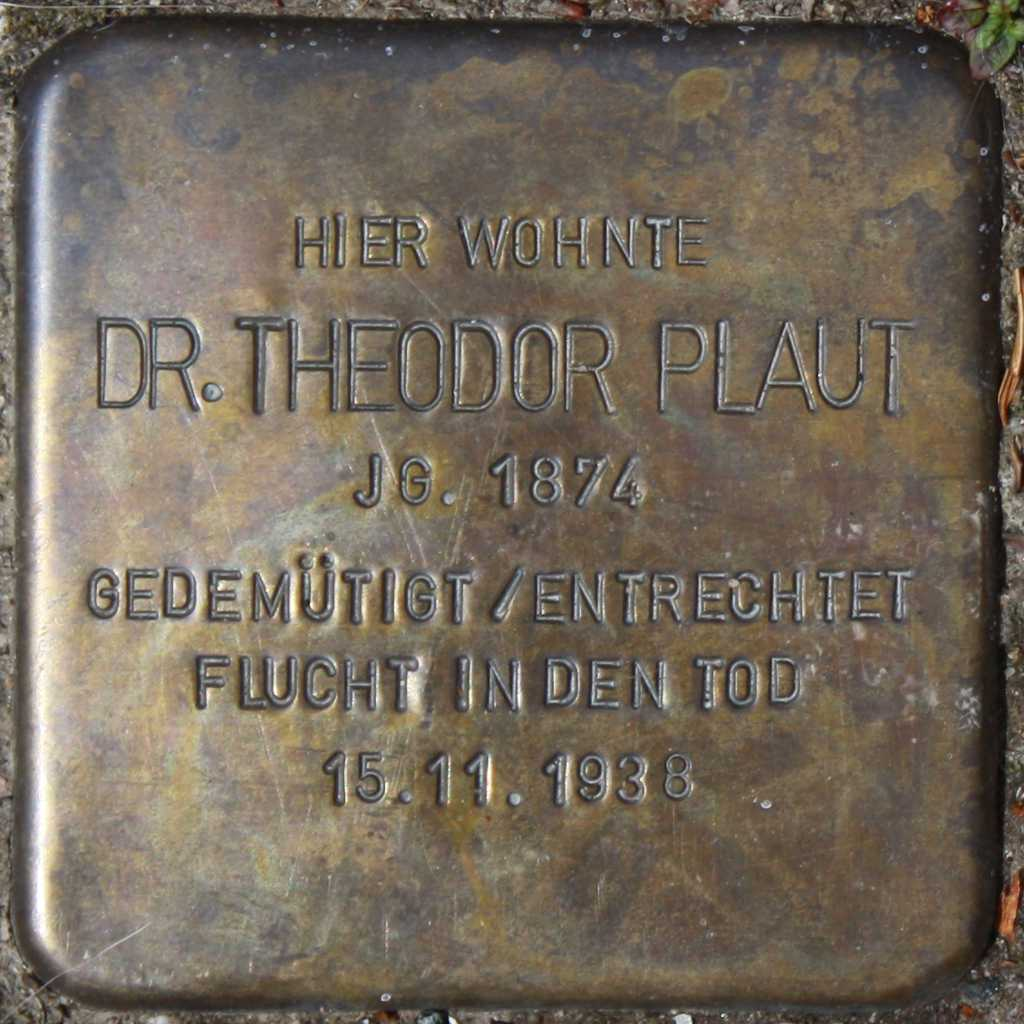
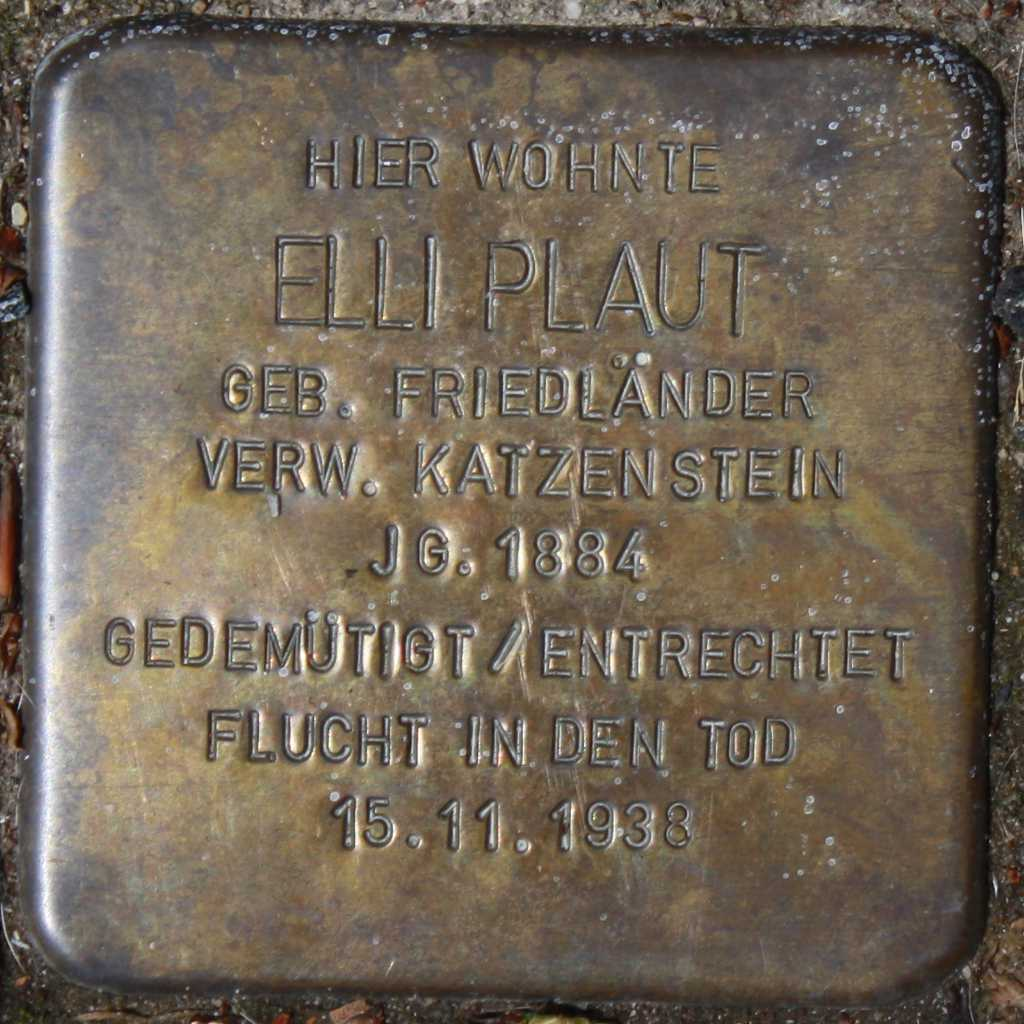
On February 28, 1933, coincidentally the day following the Reichstag fire, Plaut departed by train for Switzerland, where he was joined a few months later by Koplowitz. They initially regarded the move as a temporary transfer, not a permanent emigration, and expected to return to Frankfurt once the Nazis were turned out of office. (Note: Stolperstein memorials for Theodor and Elli Plaut Plaut's father Theodor was arrested as a socialist in February 1933 but soon released from custody, and his parents emigrated to California, where they had relatives. Facing terminal breast cancer, Plaut's mother Meta wished to spend her final days in her homeland, so his parents returned to Frankfurt, where she died in 1934. Plaut's father entered a second marriage with the widow Elli (née Friedländer) Katzenstein (1884–1938) and, reckoning with protection in Nazi Germany from former patients who were now highly placed officials, made the fateful decision to remain in Germany. Theodor and Elli Plaut died shortly after the Kristallnacht in November 1938. Although suicide was entered on their death certificates, they may actually have been killed by a Nazi assault. – During Plaut's Swiss years, his sister Elisabeth (1907–1987), a music teacher, emigrated to the Netherlands, and in 1936 she married the illustrator Leopold Meter (1909–1944), a German socialist and emigre. Since Meter was a gentile, the marriage was dissolved under the terms of the racial laws enforced in the Netherlands following the Nazi occupation in 1940. While Elisabeth managed to survive the Nazi era in various hiding places in the Netherlands, Leopold was arrested by the Gestapo in 1942, forced into military service, and killed on the battlefield at Racewo.) While Plaut and Koplowitz enrolled at the University of Basel in 1933, Koplowitz's partner Dieter Cunz, a gentile, initially remained in Frankfurt but after completing his Ph.D. in 1934 also relocated to Switzerland. Hard pressed financially and constrained in Swiss employment by their student visas, Plaut and Koplowitz, along with Cunz, relied on writing as their primary source of income. Under the collective pen-name Stefan Brockhoff, they coauthored three highly successful detective novels that were published in Nazi Germany. (Note: The detective novels coauthored by Plaut, Koplowitz, and Cunz are Schuss auf die Bühne (Leipzig: Goldmann, 1935), Musik im Totengässlein (Leipzig: Goldmann, 1936), and Drei Kioske am See (Leipzig: Goldmann, 1937). In addition, a fourth novel by "Stefan Brockhoff" appeared in postwar Germany: Begegnung in Zermatt (Munich: Goldmann, 1955). A German-language plot summary of these novels, excerpted from Paul Ott, Mord im Alpenglühen. Der Schweizer Kriminalroman – Geschichte und Gegenwart (Wuppertal: Nordpark, 2005), appears online. A fifth novel, entitled Verwirrung um Veronika, is said to have been serialized in the Zürcher Illustrierte in 1938. Cf. Angelika Jockers and Reinhard Jahn, eds., Lexikon der deutschsprachigen Krimi-Autoren (2nd ed., rev.; Munich: Verlag der Criminale, 2005).) Contemporaries of Friedrich Glauser, Plant et al. are recognized as pioneers of the specifically Swiss crime story genre (distinguished by setting and the occasional use of Helvetisms). In addition, Plaut authored under his own name a young readers’ book, Die Kiste mit dem großen S. (1936), which was published in Switzerland and also appeared in Dutch translation. He wrote numerous film reviews for Basel's National-Zeitung, and using the pseudonym Richard Plant he even authored some articles published in newspapers in Nazi Germany.

Plaut and Koplowitz both completed the Ph.D. in German literature at Basel with dissertations written under the supervision first of Franz Zinkernagel and then, following his death in 1935, Eduard Hoffmann-Krayer. Koplowitz's 1936 dissertation analyzed the Naturalistic theater work of the leftist German Jewish director Otto Brahm, while Plaut's 1937 dissertation examined the sexually charged themes and psychological narrative style of the recently deceased Austrian Jewish physician and author Arthur Schnitzler. Following his dissertation, Plaut's next non-fiction book was a compact introduction to the cinema, including formal analysis as well as an international survey of films, entitled Taschenbuch des Films (1938), based on a course he taught at the Basel Volkshochschule. Since their student visas lapsed with the completion of the Ph.D. and they were not granted work permits or immigrant status, Plaut and Koplowitz found it increasingly untenable to remain in Switzerland. Together with Cunz, they decided to seek to emigrate to the U.S. This required mobilizing all available resources and connections, including affidavits of sponsorship by relatives in the U.S. and letters of recommendation written by Paul Tillich and Martin Sommerfeld, both recent emigres now teaching at U.S. universities.

== Career in New York (1938–1973) ==
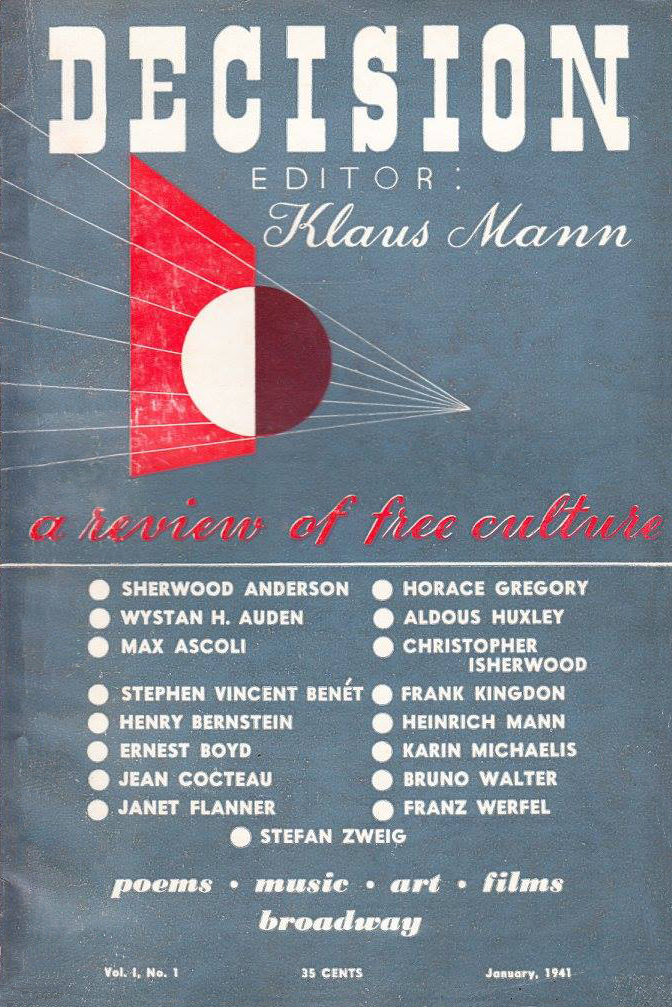
The antifascist journal Decision (1941)

Following their 1938 arrival in New York, Plaut Americanized his name to Richard Rene Plant, and Koplowitz changed his name to Seidlin. They coauthored S.O.S. Geneva, an English-language young readers' book with a cosmopolitan and pacifistic theme published in October 1939, just before the outbreak of World War II. Through the Friendship House, Plant developed first contacts with native New Yorkers, and he also sought employment by networking within New York's burgeoning community of German emigres, some of whom communicated in the pages of the left-wing German Jewish weekly Aufbau. During 1941–42 he was employed by the recently arrived emigre Klaus Mann as an editorial assistant for the antifascist journal Decision, and he also worked for the recently arrived emigre Siegfried Kracauer. Following the American entry into World War II, Plant finally found full-time employment for three years as a propaganda scriptwriter, translator, and broadcaster for the U.S. Office of War Information and for NBC. He enjoyed life as a gay man during the war years, which brought a steady stream of unattached young men in uniform to New York. He was naturalized as a U.S. citizen on January 29, 1945.

Following the end of World War II, Plant and his friends went separate ways when Seidlin and Cunz held professorships in German studies in Massachusetts and Maryland, respectively, and later, together as a gay couple, at Ohio State University, where they rose to considerable prominence (in a signal honor, OSU's building for foreign languages and literatures was posthumously named after Cunz). Plant remained in New York, where in 1947 he was hired by the City College of the City University of New York. To complete work on his highly autobiographical novel The Dragon in the Forest (1948), Plant was awarded a Eugene F. Saxton Memorial Trust Fellowship, (Note: Another recipient of the Saxton Memorial Trust Fellowship in 1945 was James Baldwin, then a 21-year-old author of stories and essays collected ten years later in Notes of a Native Son.) for which he was recommended by Norman Cousins. The book centers on a young man growing up in Frankfurt who is witness to the rise of the Nazis and whose best boyhood friend becomes a victim of Fritz Haarmann. Critical reception was mixed.

From time to time, Plant's book reviews of current German literature, including works by Heinrich Böll, Günter Grass, Marie Luise Kaschnitz, and Luise Rinser, were published in the New York Times, Saturday Review, The Nation, Esquire, and other periodicals. In 1957, he edited a collection of short stories by Böll selected and annotated for use in German language instruction. In 1970, he coedited a second, more widely adopted reader for intermediate-level college instruction. Although he was successful enough as a classroom teacher to be granted tenure in 1957 and promotion to full professor in 1970, Plant struggled with condescending colleagues who disparaged his lack of scholarly publications while pooh-poohing his editorial and journalistic contributions. He resided in Greenwich Village, and summer holidays were spent with his friends Seidlin and Cunz in the mountains at Mallnitz, Austria, or on the beach at Manomet, Massachusetts, where they hobnobbed with the vacationing Hannah Arendt.

In 1956, Plant published (in English) an essay and the first of five short stories under the pseudonym Orlando Gibbons in the Swiss gay periodical Der Kreis. The essay commented on the anti-gay dimension of the McCarthy witch hunt of the preceding years, while the stories "are charming, happy-ending vignettes of gay life in New York City and Massachusetts, two of them with interesting black/white encounters. Especially touching is the story of a white boy who, despite his Southern upbringing, discovers that he can love a black man." The year 1965 saw the premiere of the opera Lizzie Borden, for which Plant had written the scenario. He regarded this as one of his foremost accomplishments.

== The Pink Triangle ==
Following his retirement from university teaching in 1973, Plant was able to devote more time to his own interests, although he continued to offer occasional courses on German literature in translation at the New School for Social Research. Impressed by the formation of the Gay Academic Union and historical studies sparked by the gay liberation movement, he joined Senior Action in a Gay Environment and embarked upon his most ambitious writing project, a history of the persecution of gay men under the Nazi regime. As a gay man driven from Germany by the Nazis, he approached this topic as a matter of honor, and the book opens and closes with an autobiographical prologue and epilogue. In the course of his research, he traveled to Arolsen, Germany, to examine the concentration camp archives assembled there. His magnum opus, The Pink Triangle: The Nazi War Against Homosexuals, was published in 1986, and it was translated into German five years later, leading to a successful book tour in Germany. It has also been translated into Dutch (1987) and Slovenian (1991).

Plant's companion during his final years was Michael Sasse. Plant experienced major depression and was treated with electroshock therapy. He died in New York City on March 10, 1998. His papers are preserved in the Manuscripts and Archives Division of the New York Public Library.

== See also ==
- Persecution of homosexuals in Nazi Germany
