= Witold Krassowski =

Polish photographer (born 1956)

Witold Krassowski (born 10 April 1956 in Warsaw) is a Polish photographer and university teacher. He twice won a prize in the international contest World Press Photo.

== Life ==
Krassowski grew up in Warsaw. After graduating from high school, he studied French literature and applied linguistics at the University of Warsaw from 1975 to 1979. In 1979/80 he completed a year of study at the Institute of General Linguistics at the Sorbonne Nouvelle University Paris 3. After his return, he completed his studies with a diploma in Warsaw.

After his studies, Krassowski turned to photography, the knowledge he had acquired as an autodidact. In 1988 he went to England to earn money for house painting. During this time, he visited the editors of the London daily newspaper The Independent to present his portfolio of photographic work. He immediately received further commissions and for the next six months worked for The Independent. After his return, he worked as a photo reporter for Polish and foreign magazines.

In 2009 he obtained a doctorate with a dissertation submitted to the Institute of Film and Television at the University of Silesia in Katowice. He accepted lectureships at the Academy of Fine Arts in Warsaw. In 2012, he resided at the Academy. He held the post of vice-dean there. In 2017 he became a professor at the Warsaw Academy of Fine Arts.

== Photographic work ==
Krassowski has specialised in black-and-white photography. His photo reportages in black and white from Poland, Russia, countries in Asia, Africa and Latin America were printed by many international newspapers and journals, including The New Yorker, Forbes, The Observer, Libération, Der Spiegel, Stern, Focus.

In 1992 he won third prize in the category "Daily Life – Stories" in the World Press Photo contest with a black-and-white reportage on everyday life in Afghanistan. In 1999 he was appointed to the jury of this contest. In 2003, he again was a prize-winner at World Press Photo: He won third prize in the category Science and Technology for a black-and-white reportage on the operation of the historic steam locomotives of Wolsztyn near Poznan. In 1994, 1995, 1996, 1997, 2000 and 2003 he was one of the winners of the competition Polska Fotografia Prasowa (Polish Press Photography).

His portrait series includes an album of photos of Polish actors who were once very well known throughout the country, but who withdrew from the public eye in old age and have in some cases been forgotten by the public. This photo series became the basis of his habilitation thesis.

Krassowski's work has been shown many times in Polish cities. He has also had solo exhibitions in the USA, several European cities, and the Afghan capital Kabul.

== Solo exhibitions abroad ==
- Freightdoors Gallery, Santa Clara/California, USA 1988
- The Photographers Gallery, London 1989
- Days of Polish Culture, Kabul 1991
- Cologne, 2001
- Munich, Haus des deutschen Ostens, 2001
- Kgaleria, Lizbon 2006
- Polish Institute, Budapest 2007
- Berlaymont Hall, European Commission, Brussels 2009
- KievFotoCom, Kiev 2011
- Gallery of the Society for Arts, Chicago 2016
- Vo vse glaza / All Eyes, Multimedia Art Museum, Moscow 2019

== Awards (selection) ==
- World Press Photo (Third Prize, category: Daily Life — Stories), 1992
- Yellow Pencil. British Design & Art Direction (Silver medal), 2001
- World Press Photo (Third Prize, Category: Science & Technology Stories), 2003
- Art & Worship Award, Niavaran Foundation, Teheran/Iran (First Prize), 2005

== Photo books ==
- Visages de l'Est. Nathan Images, Paris 1991, ISBN 2-09-24008-2-7.
- Afganistan. EKpictures, Warsaw 2006 ISBN 978-83-88814-66-2
- Powidoki z Polski / Afterimages of Poland / Ansichten, Nachsichten. Text: S. Mizerski, T. Urban. EKpictures, Warsaw 2009 ISBN 978-83-910577-1-1
- Pieśń na wyjście. Ostatni mistrzowie sceny. EKpictures, Warsaw 2010 ISBN 978-83-910577-2-8
- Sackcloth And Ashes. GOST Books, London 2020 ISBN 978-19-10401-40-8
