= Altes Brauhaus Dudeldorf =

Coordinates: 49.9745°N 6.6379°E

- Interactive map of the Altes Brauhaus Dudeldorf area

General information
- Type: House
- Location: Dudeldorf, Germany
- Completed: 1700

Design and construction
- Designations: Listed

The Old Brauhaus is a listed building of civil architecture in the Lord alley of Dudeldorf, a local church in the district of Bitburg-Prüm. In the three-storey ensemble is the one built in 1700 to a corner building with mansard roof. In the mid-18th century it was rebuilt and probably also enlarged. A biaxial construction erected on Church Street, probably in the middle of the 18th century, completes the house ensemble.

== History ==
The house was close to the Burg Dudeldorf and built in the immediate vicinity of the church. 1794 the landowner Jacob Goh was mentioned as a host and guest holder documented. To date, the name "Gohs" is commonly referred to as House name in the vernacular. In 1806 the Rotgerber Robert Munich married Anna Caroline Gohs, the daughter of the host. In 1836 the brewer William Joseph Servatius married the daughter that married people and founded the brewery Servatius. He supplied the restaurants in the surrounding villages with beer. Even today, in the house a stone to be found in whipped brewery cellar, which is now used as a wine cellar.

In 1860 William Joseph Servatius died and his son Wilhelm Philipp Servatius carried on the brewing business. After his death in 1884, the brewery ceased operations. Since 1879, the house Servatius was referring beer from the brewery Theobald Simon in Bitburg. One of the ancestors of the Simon family, who founded the now famous Bitburger brewery, learned the brewing trade from Servatius.

1909 was the granary of the house during construction of the Dudeldorfer parish church " Assumption " as a temporary church available. 1911 Edmund Servatius with his wife Elisabeth Fabry took over the inn with the associated farm. In 1917, their son Karl Alois Servatius was born. During World War II the stone cellar served as an air raid shelter for more than 120 people. In 1954, Alois Servatius with his wife Magda Pallien the foundation for today's form. During the fifties and sixties, the house became a meeting point and fixed point in Dudeldorf and its surroundings. Also the American officers from Spangdahlem Air Base were good customers. In 1976 the house was modernized and rebuilt taking into account the old familiar buildings. In 1980, the "Old Brauhaus Servatius" was added to that of the Romantic Hotels Group. In 1990, his son Rudolf Servatius took over the hotel. He was a star chef and bought the property of the parish garden added to his garden plot. After the death of Rudolf Servatius, his Magda Servatius left the hotel. In 2004, the operation was discontinued. The "Old Brewery" is no longer in a quiet country of the Family Servatius.
