= Ludwig Dehio =

German archivist and historian

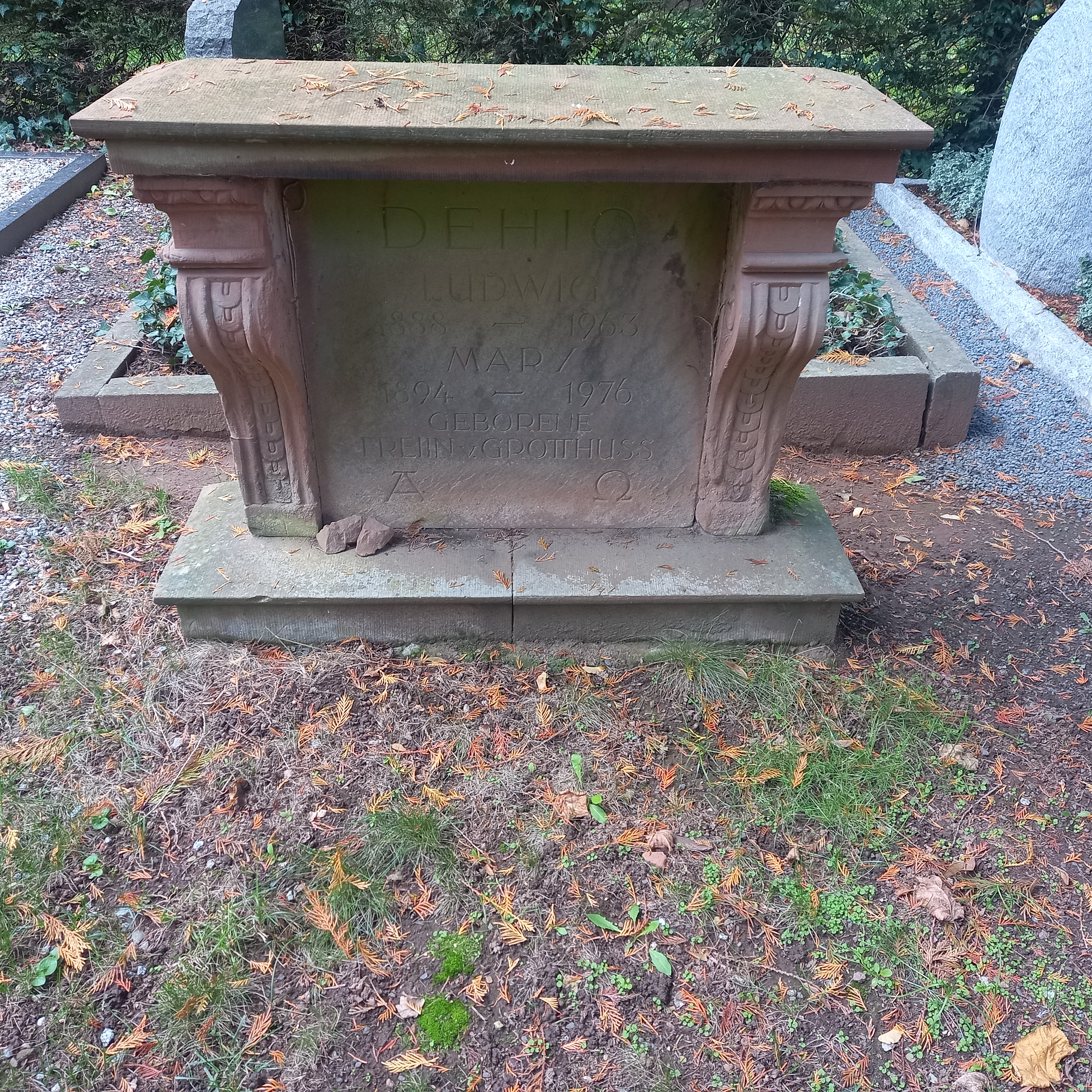
Grave of Ludwig Dehio and his wife Mary in the cemetery in Marburg

Ludwig Dehio (25 August 1888 – 24 November 1963) was a German archivist and historian.

Dehio was born in Königsberg, the son of art historian Georg Dehio. He studied philosophy, philology and history at the University of Strasbourg and received his doctorate in 1912. Later in his career he served as Staatsarchivrat at the Geheimes Staatsarchiv Preußischer Kulturbesitz (Prussian Privy State Archives) in Berlin. From 1945 to 1954 he was director of the Hessian state archives in Marburg. He was catalyst in the founding of the "archives school" in Marburg.

In 1946 he was named an honorary professor of medieval and modern history at the University of Marburg. From 1949 to 1956 he was an editor of the Historische Zeitschrift. He died in Marburg.

The relevance of Dehio's classic work on The precarious balance was highlighted in a commentary in Die Zeit (2003). Historian Volker Ullrich, reflecting on "U.S. hegemony" after the Cold War, called for policymakers to revisit classics like Dehio in the tradition of Leopold von Ranke, whose insights he found echoed in Heinrich August Winkler's works. Ullrich proposed to apply Dehio's balance-of-power thinking to contemporary politics:

This hegemonic power, which has drifted away from its own values, must be restrained—and who is better suited for this task, given its painful historical experiences, than old Europe? England, the classic proponent of the balance of power, has subordinated itself to the U.S. under Tony Blair, but there are also nascent efforts in Europe to form a counterweight. These should be expanded. (...) And they (the classics) hold an important lesson: Every attempt by a power to dominate the world has so far failed. Hubris is followed by nemesis.

== Published works ==
Works by Dehio that have been translated into English:

- "Germany and world politics in the twentieth century" (1959); translated by Dieter Pevsner, Deutschland und die Weltpolitik im 20. Jahrhundert (1955).
- "The precarious balance; four centuries of the European power struggle" (1962); translated by Charles Fullman, Gleichgewicht oder Hegemonie: Betrachtungen über ein Grundproblem der neueren Staatengeschichte (1948).

Works with German titles:

- Innozenz IV. und England, 1913 – Innocent IV and England.
- Historisch-politisches Archiv zur deutschen Geschichte des 19. und 20. Jahrhunderts, 1930 – Historical-political archives of German history in the 19th and 20th centuries.
- Übersicht über die Bestände des Brandenburg-preussischen Hausarchivs zu Berlin-Charlottenburg, 1936.
- Friedrich Meinecke, der Historiker in der Krise: Festrede, 1952 – Friedrich Meinecke, an historian in the crisis.
- Friedrich Wilhelm IV. von Preussen. Ein Baukünstler der Romantik, 1961 – Friedrich Wilhelm IV of Prussia, an architect of Romanticism.

Works About Dehio

Aaron Zack, "Hegemonic War and Grand Strategy: Ludwig Dehio, World History, and the American Future" (Lexington Books, 2017.)
