= Dieter Cunz =

German-American academic (1910 – 1969)

- Born: Hans Dietrich Cunz; August 4, 1910; Höchstenbach, Kingdom of Prussia, German Empire
- Died: February 17, 1969 (aged 58); Columbus, Ohio, USA
- Resting place: Walnut Grove Cemetery, Worthington, Ohio
- Occupation: Professor of German
- Years active: 1939–1969
- Notable work: The Maryland Germans: A History (1948)
- Partner: Oskar Seidlin
- Awards: Officer's Cross of the Federal Republic of Germany (1959); Alfred J. Wright Award of Ohio State University (1964)

External image
- Portrait photo of Dieter Cunz, c. 1965

Dieter Cunz (August 4, 1910 – February 17, 1969) was an émigré from Nazi Germany first to Switzerland and then to the U.S. who taught German language and literature as a professor at the University of Maryland from 1939 to 1957 and at Ohio State University from 1957 until his death in 1969. He authored a number of fictional and non-fictional works.

== Youth in Germany ==
Cunz was born to Hedwig (née Silbersiepe) and Paul Cunz in remote Höchstenbach (in the Westerwald). In 1917 the family moved to Schierstein, adjacent to Wiesbaden, where he attended a humanities-focused gymnasium from 1920 to 1929. As a young man, he was at loggerheads with his father, an Evangelical Lutheran pastor who admired Adolf Hitler and hoisted the swastika flag at his church well prior to the Nazi takeover in 1933. Cunz began his peripatetic university studies at the Ludwig-Maximilians-Universität München for one semester in 1929, before transferring to Leipzig University, where he enrolled for three semesters and studied political and diplomatic history, the history of religion, and German literature, attending courses taught by Erich Brandenburg, Hans Driesch, Theodor Litt, H. A. Korff and Georg Witkowski. He studied next at the University of Königsberg in the spring of 1931 (where he heard the historian Hans Rothfels) before finally transferring to the University of Frankfurt am Main. Here in the fall of 1931, he met two gay Jewish students of German literature, Richard Plaut and Oskar Koplowitz, and Koplowitz became his life partner. In the closing years of the Weimar Republic, Cunz, Koplowitz, and Plaut sympathized with the leftist student political group that was increasingly forced onto the defensive by the growing Nazi Students League.

== Life in Switzerland ==
Shortly after Hitler came to power in 1933, Koplowitz and Plaut left Germany and enrolled at the University of Basel, Switzerland. Cunz chose to remain in Frankfurt to complete his Ph.D. dissertation on Johann Casimir of Simmern, a staunch Calvinist who was a leader of mercenary troops in the religious wars of the sixteenth century, including the Dutch Revolt. His dissertation director was Walter Platzhoff (1881–1969), a Nazi stalwart who advanced to head the entire university from 1934 to 1945. After receiving his Ph.D. in 1934, Cunz moved from Frankfurt to Königshütte, where Koplowitz's parents lived, and then in 1935 to Switzerland to join Koplowitz, who completed a Ph.D. in German literature in 1936. The two soon relocated from Basel to Lausanne. Hard-pressed financially and unable to seek employment under the terms of their Swiss student visas, Koplowitz and Plaut relied on writing under pseudonyms as their primary source of income. Plaut adopted the alias Plant, and Koplowitz made use of the nom de plume Seidlin. In addition, under the collective pen name Stefan Brockhoff, they coauthored with Cunz three detective novels that were published in Nazi Germany. Because he had enrolled in the Reich Chamber of Literature in 1934, Cunz was able to use his name when he published in Germany a study of European constitutional history, Europäische Verfassungsgeschichte der Neuzeit (1936). This was followed a year later by a monograph on the Swiss reformer Ulrich Zwingli, published in Switzerland. His Um uns herum. Märchen aus dem Alltag also appeared in Switzerland in 1938. Whereas Cunz was tolerated by the Swiss authorities and was entitled to work as a freelance journalist, Plaut and Koplowitz found it increasingly difficult to remain in Switzerland after their student visas expired with the completion of their doctorates.

== Career in the United States ==
In 1938, Cunz, Koplowitz, and Plaut immigrated to the U.S., where within a year their paths diverged. While Plaut, who officially changed his name to Plant, remained in New York, Koplowitz, who changed his name to Seidlin, moved to Massachusetts in 1939 to take up a teaching position at Smith College. Cunz, who arrived in New York in August 1938, relocated to Maryland in October 1939 with funding from the Ferdinand Meyer Fund to work up a historical study of the German-Americans settled in the state of Maryland, published in 1940, a precursor to his magisterial The Maryland Germans: A History (1948). His research on the Maryland Germans was also supported by the Oberlaender Trust of the Carl Schurz Memorial Foundation. Cunz was among the early specialists in German-American studies and authored numerous articles on German immigrants between the colonial period and the Civil War, such as the explorer Johann Lederer and the radical abolitionist Karl Follen.

In 1939, Cunz was expelled from the Nazi Writers' Association and appointed to an instructorship at the University of Maryland, College Park, where he advanced to an assistant professorship in 1942. In 1944, he was naturalized as a U.S. citizen. He was promoted to associate professor with tenure in 1947 and to full professor in 1949, and he served as chair of the German Department. In addition to teaching language and literature courses, he taught a historical survey entitled "From Arminius to Adenauer: A Course in German Civilization".

In 1957, Cunz accepted an offer to chair the German Department at Ohio State University following the departure of Bernhard Blume for Harvard University. Here he joined his partner Seidlin, who had been teaching at Ohio State since 1946, and the two contracted to have a house built in the suburb Worthington. Ohio State's German Department burgeoned during the twelve years of Cunz's chairmanship, albeit largely in response to national demographic and political trends (the baby boomer wave paired with the National Defense Education Act), but also in part thanks to Cunz's administrative acumen. He expected all departmental colleagues, including the literature specialists such as Seidlin, to shoulder their fair share of "service" courses, i.e., language instruction. With Curtis C. D. Vail (1903–1957) of the University of Washington, Cunz coauthored German for Beginners (1958), a textbook that was widely adopted throughout the U.S. It advanced beyond the traditional "grammar-translation" approach to the more communicative audio-lingual method and made use of language lab tapes. A second edition (1965) was coauthored with his junior colleague Ulrich A. Groenke (1924–2013), a Scandinavian linguist. Cunz edited an abridged version of Ricarda Huch's Der letzte Sommer, a "novel in letters set during the fight of the Russian anarchists against the Czarist regime", for use in German language instruction. He also edited Heinrich Jung-Stilling's autobiography (1777–78), a canonical precursor of the Bildungsroman and a classic document of German Pietism. To the genre of young readers' literature belongs his They Came from Germany: The Stories of Famous German-Americans, published in 1966.

Cunz and Seidlin enjoyed summer vacations in the company of Richard Plant in Manomet, Massachusetts, and Mallnitz, Austria. Plant described Cunz in these terms:

Dieter awakened trust in almost everyone. He radiated an irresistible friendliness and was not just able to avoid disputes, but also to settle them — a natural mediator and referee. He could win people over, and people believed him when, after carefully thinking things over, he proposed a simple solution that no one else would have ever come up with. When he said he would do something, no one doubted that he would actually do it. At meetings and conferences he would break the ice, establish an atmosphere of collegiality, harmony, even confidentiality. Later they called him a 'topnotch public relations officer'. But that label is not quite correct, because public relations is something you can learn. But Dieter didn't even have to make an effort — he was a natural-born confidante and, to use a term you can encounter in old books, completely guileless.

In 1959, he was awarded the Officer's Cross by the Federal Republic of Germany "in recognition of his efforts on behalf of German language instruction in the United States and his scholarly contributions in the field of German American immigration history". In 1961 the Arts College Student Council of Ohio State University awarded him its Good Teaching Award, and in 1964 he received the Alfred J. Wright Award for "dedicated service to student activities and student organizations". With tongue firmly in cheek, Cunz described himself in these terms in late December 1968, just a few weeks before his death:

I am sceptical by nature; . . . I am the eternal sourpuss — flowers wilt when I enter the room, and the milk of human kindness curdles. . . . Others who know me will say, "An old curmudgeon like you will see to it that all the Christmas spirit is thoroughly demolished. You will keep us aware that there are more difficulties than there are solutions."

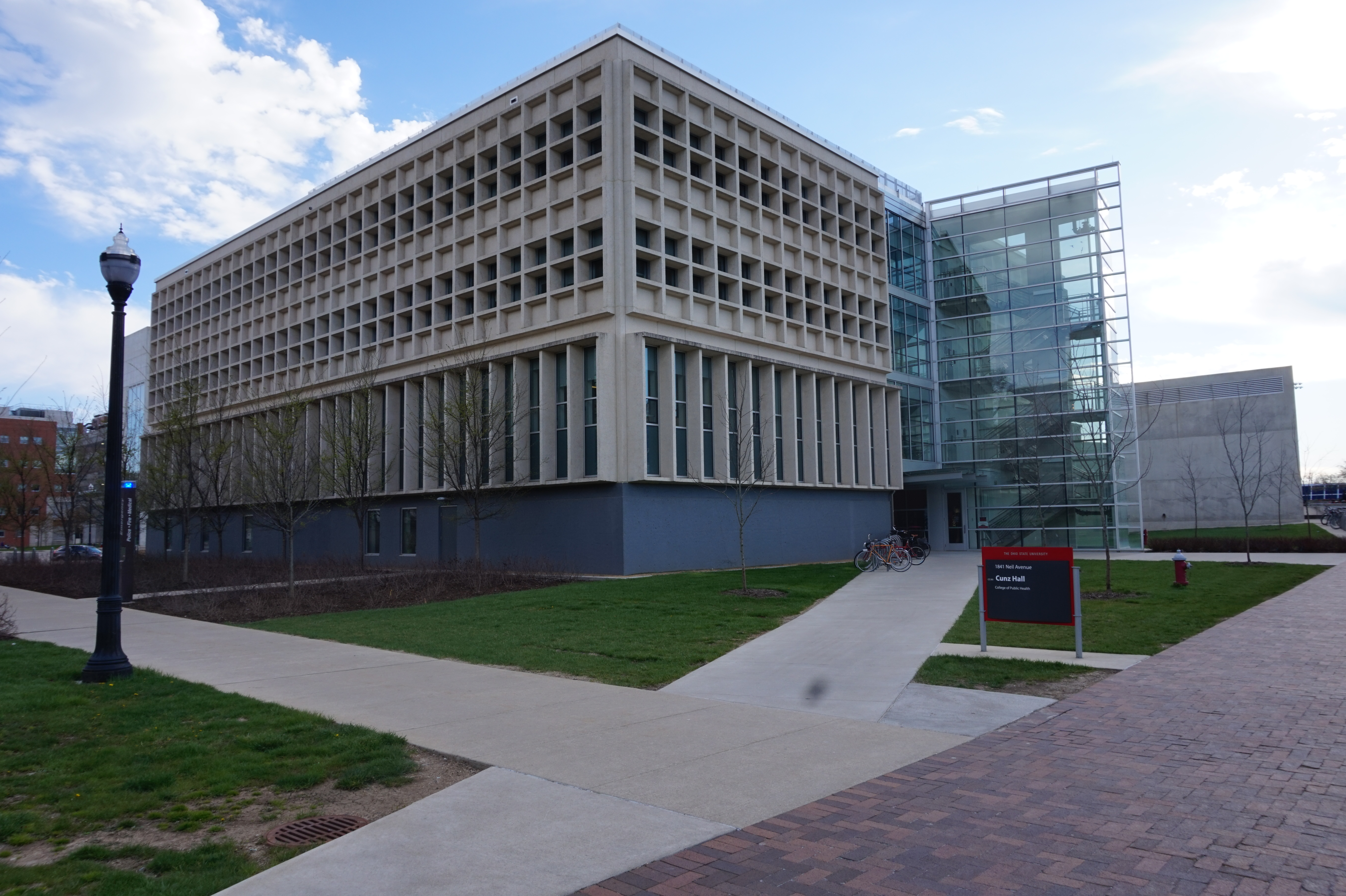
Cunz Hall

Cunz was in declining health during his final years, suffering from high blood pressure and a heart valve defect. Even so, his death following a heart attack on February 17 (Seidlin's birthday), 1969, at the age of 58, was unexpected and plunged Seidlin into a deep depression. In a signal honor, Ohio State University in 1969 named its new building for foreign languages and literatures after him (Dieter Cunz Hall of Languages, at 1841 Millikin Road, Columbus, Ohio). Following Seidlin's death in 1984, his remains were interred alongside those of Cunz at the Walnut Grove Cemetery in Worthington.

== See also ==
- Richard Plant
- Oskar Seidlin
