= Martin Sommerfeld =

External image
- Portrait photograph of Martin Sommerfeld held by the Leo Baeck Institute, New York

Martin Sommerfeld (May 2, 1894 – July 26, 1939) was a Jewish émigré from Nazi Germany to the U.S. who was a professor at the University of Frankfurt am Main and subsequently at Columbia University, the City College of New York, Smith College, and Middlebury College, where he taught German language and literature. He authored and edited a number of volumes on German literature from the 16th to the 20th centuries, and he wrote numerous contributions to the four-volume Reallexikon der deutschen Literaturgeschichte (1925–1931).

== Biography ==
Martin Sommerfeld was born in Angerburg, East Prussia, to Bertha (née Klein) and Heinrich Sommerfeld, a factory owner. After attending school in Königsberg (Prussia) and Insterburg and passing the Abitur at the Prinz-Heinrichs-Gymnasium in Berlin-Schöneberg, he studied German language and literature as well as English and French literature, art history, philosophy, and medieval and modern history at the Friedrich Wilhelm University of Berlin, the University of Frankfurt am Main, and the Ludwig-Maximilians-Universität München, where in 1916 he received his Ph.D. with a dissertation on Friedrich Nicolai written under the direction of Franz Muncker. In 1919, he married Helene Schott (1892–1974). After completing a habilitation thesis on Goethe and Hebbel under the supervision of Franz Schultz (1877–1950) at the University of Frankfurt am Main, he became a lecturer there in 1922 and in 1927 advanced to a professorship. Among his students who later rose to prominence were Wilhelm Emrich, Ernst Erich Noth, Richard Plaut, and Oskar Salo Koplowitz. Among Sommerfeld's colleagues in the department of German studies at the University of Frankfurt am Main, his antipode was Hans Naumann, who backed the Nazi book burnings in May 1933.

After the National Socialist seizure of power in 1933, Sommerfeld's professorship was terminated on the basis of the anti-Semitic Law for the Restoration of the Professional Civil Service. He immigrated to the U.S., where he was initially employed as a "Visiting Foreign Instructor of German" at Columbia University and there advanced to a visiting professorship. From 1935 until 1936, he moved to the City College of New York as a "Special Lecturer", and in 1936 he relocated again, this time to a professorship at Smith College. He had accepted an appointment to begin teaching at the newly founded Queens College in the fall of 1939 when he died, aged 45, while teaching at the Middlebury Summer School. "He was happy in his new surroundings, enthusiastic about his American students and colleagues, and thankful to the democracy that had so generously opened its doors to him and his family."

In 1936 his doctoral dissertation was placed on the Nazi list of works by forbidden authors. On May 30, 1939, the Third Reich voided his German citizenship, and on August 1, 1940, it was announced that the Ludwig-Maximilians-Universität München had posthumously divested him of his doctorate.

== Works (selected) ==
- Friedrich Nicolai und der Sturm und Drang. Ein Beitrag zur Geschichte der deutschen Aufklärung. Ph.D. dissertation. Munich 1916; Leipzig: Bonna, 1917; Halle a. S.: Niemeyer, 1921
- (Ed.) Moritz August von Thümmel: Wilhelmine; oder, Der verliebte Pedant. Munich: Roland-Verlag, 1918
- (Ed.) Vormärz. Eine lyrische Anthologie. Munich: Roland-Verlag, 1918
- (Ed.) Jean Paul: Friedenspredigt. Eine Auswahl aus seinen politischen Schriften. Munich: Dreiländerverlag, 1919
- Hebbel und Goethe. Studien zur Geschichte des deutschen Klassizismus im 19. Jahrhundert. Habilitation dissertation. Bonn: F. Cohen, 1923
- With Paul Hirsch. Deutsche Klitteraturgeschichte in groben Zügen. Ein bibliopsiles Repetitorium. Den Mitgliedern der Frankfurter Bibliophilen-Gesellschaft gewidmet. Offenbach: W. Gerstung, 1924 (14 pp.)
- Der Bücherleser. Gedanken zu seiner Rechtfertigung. Für die Mitglieder der Frankfurter Bibliophilen Gesellschaft abgezogen und ihnen zum 22. Februar 1925 gewidmet. Frankfurt am Main: Frankfurter Bibliophilen-Gesellschaft, 1925 (29 pp.)
- (Ed.) Johann Christoph Sachse: Der deutsche Gil Blas, eingeführt von Goethe. Frankfurt am Main: Frankfurter Verlags-Anstalt, 1925
- (Ed.) Johann Georg Hamann: Versuch einer Sibylle über die Ehe. Frankfurt am Main: Hirsch, 1925
- (Ed.) Deutsche Barocklyrik. Berlin: Junker & Dünnhaupt, 1929
- (Ed.) Deutsche Lyrik 1880–1930, nach Motiven ausgewählt und geordnet. Berlin: Junker & Dünnhaupt, 1931
- (Ed.) Romantische Lyrik, nach Motiven ausgewählt und geordnet. Berlin: Junker & Dünnhaupt, 1932
- (Ed.) Judith-Dramen des 16. und 17. Jahrhunderts nebst Luthers Vorrede zum Buch Judith. Berlin: Junker & Dünnhaupt, 1933
- Goethe in Umwelt und Folgezeit. Gesammelte Studien. Leiden: A. W. Sijthoff, 1935
- "Die Gestalt des Lehrers in der deutschen Literatur", German Quarterly 10 (1937) pp. 107–122
- (Ed.) George, Hofmannsthal, Rilke. New York: Norton, 1938

== Literature ==
- Salomon Wininger. Große jüdische National-Biographie. Nendeln: Kraus Reprint, 1979. ISBN 3-262-01204-1 (Reprint of the edition Czernowitz 1925)
- Enst Feise. "Martin Sommerfeld, 1894–1939 (Zum Gedächtnis)", German Quarterly 12,4 (1939), pp. 176–178
- Oskar Seidlin, "Martin Sommerfeld, geb. 1894, gest. d. 26. Juli 1939", Monatshefte 31,7 (November 1939), pp. 355–356
- John Whyte. "Martin Sommerfeld – In memoriam", Modern Language Journal 24 (1939), pp. 141–142
- Joseph Walk, ed. Kurzbiographien zur Geschichte der Juden 1918–1945, ed. Leo Baeck Institute, Jerusalem. München: Saur, 1988. ISBN 3-598-10477-4* Wolfgang Adam. "Sommerfeld, Martin". Internationales Germanistenlexikon 1800–1950, ed. Christoph König, et al. 3 vols., Berlin/New York: de Gruyter, 2003, vol. 3, pp. 1760f.
- Stefanie Harrecker. Degradierte Doktoren. Die Aberkennung der Doktorwürde an der Ludwig-Maximilians-Universität München während der Zeit des Nationalsozialismus. Munich: Utz, 2007. ISBN 978-3-8316-0691-7
- Lexikon deutsch-jüdischer Autoren, vol. 19. Berlin: de Gruyter, 2012, pp. 285–290
- Anna Eberhardt. "Martin Sommerfeld – Wegbereiter der Rezeptionsästhetik?" Frankfurter Literaturwissenschaftler 1914-1945, ed. Frank Estelmann and Bernd Zegowitz. 2014. Online
