= Dudeldorf =

- Municipality
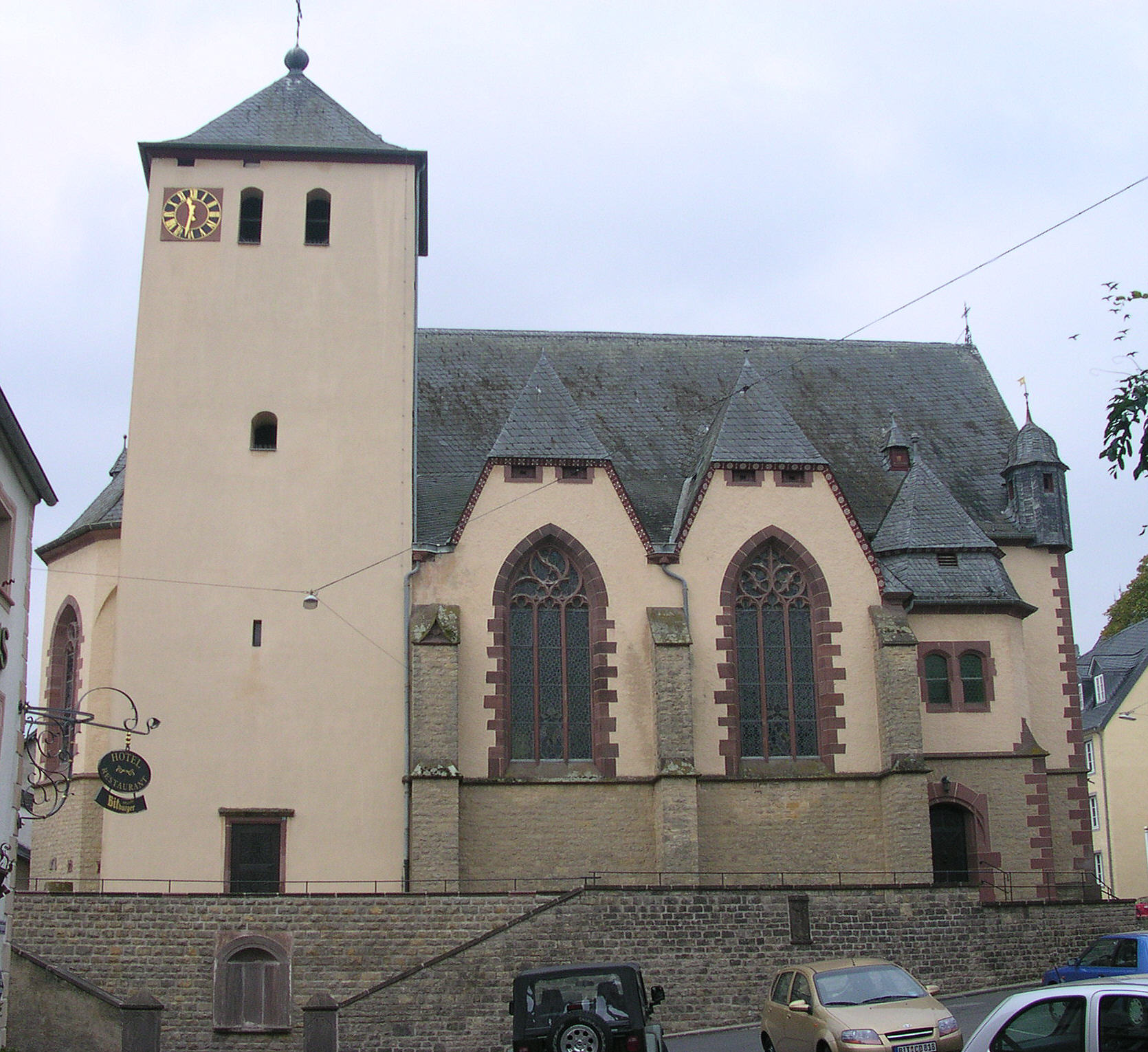
- Dudeldorf Church

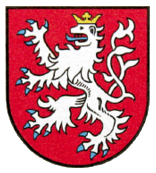
- Coat of arms

- Location of Dudeldorf within Eifelkreis Bitburg-Prüm district
- Interactive map of Dudeldorf
- Location within Germany Location within Rhineland-Palatinate
- Coordinates: 49°58′26″N 6°38′11″E
- Country: Germany
- State: Rhineland-Palatinate
- District: Eifelkreis Bitburg-Prüm
- Municipal assoc.: Bitburger Land

Government
  - Mayor (2019–24): Stefan Lonien

Area
  - Total: 11.03 km^{2} (4.26 sq mi)
- Elevation: 290 m (950 ft)

Population (2025-12-31)
  - Total: 1,282
  - Density: 116.2/km^{2} (301.0/sq mi)
- Time zone: UTC+01:00 (CET)
  - Summer (DST): UTC+02:00 (CEST)
- Postal codes: 54647
- Dialling codes: 06565
- Vehicle registration: BIT
- Website: www.dudeldorf.de

Dudeldorf is a village municipality in the district of Bitburg-Prüm, in the state of Rhineland-Palatinate, Germany. It is located about 10 km (6 miles) east of Bitburg, 42 km (26 miles) north of Trier, and 32 km (20 miles) east of the Luxembourg border. It has a population of around 1300, including 220 US Defense personnel.

The village was heavily damaged during World War II but has since been completely rebuilt. Dudeldorf Castle is the main attraction in the village. Originally consisting of two castles built in the 12th century, it has since been rebuilt many times. It now serves as a function and community center. The surrounding countryside also makes Dudeldorf a popular holiday destination for tourists.

== History ==
=== Middle Ages ===
The village was first documented in the year 815 AD, under the name 'Duodelonis Villa'. At that time, written sources also mentioned the von Dudeldorf family, who were entrusted with the two castles in the village. The castles were given to the Archbishop of Trier by the Count of Vianden under feudal service.

In late 1375, the male family line died out, followed by a change of ownership of the two castles. John of Bohemia, the Count of Luxembourg, granted a royal charter (a Freiheitsbrief) to Dudeldorf in 1345.

In 1451, the Lords John, Count of Nassau, Vianden and Diez, and Johann, Lord of Kriechingen, imposed a tax on the citizens to restore the gates and walls of the castles. Around 1470, Count George von Virneburg managed the only known enemy incursion into Dudeldorf, which concluded without a fight. It did cause a fire, thought the extent of damage is unknown.

In 1632, the Braun von Schmidtburg family came into possession of both castles via the estate of the Imperial Abbey of St. Maximin.

In 1734, two houses still in existence were expanded; the second still appears in the Austrian cadastral map from 1766, but due to its poor state is listed as a sheep barn. Like Orndorf, Dudeldorf belonged to the Duchy of Luxembourg until 1789. Until 1794, the lordship was exercised by three lords: the Trier monasteries St. Irminen, St. Maximin, and the lords of the castle in Dudeldorf, Orndorf, and a part of Gondorf.

After the sale of the castle in 1813, a part of the building was given to the community for use as a school. In 1856, with the adoption of the Prussian town and rural municipal code, these privileges were lost. Subsequently, Dudeldorf was a rural community and the seat of a mayor's office in the district of Bitburg. In 1860, the villages of Gindorf, Metternich and Orndorf were combined with Dudeldorf into current-day Dudeldorf.

=== Nazi Rule and the Second World War ===
In 1937, the neighboring Orndorf village was incorporated into Dudeldorf. German soldiers were stationed in Dudeldorf and its surroundings. On September 1, 1939, the German Army called up all reservists. Later that year, more experienced soldiers were stationed in the area with the start of the Western campaign. In late 1940, 121 more soldiers were moved to Dudeldorf, making the citizen-to-soldier ratio eight to one. Farmers from Dudeldorf were asked to increase their food production. In 1943 and 1944, low-flying aerial strikes on Dudeldorf increased. In the district graveyard on Philipp Straße, a radar station was built. The accompanying soldiers were housed in self-built shacks.

In June 1944, 22 American bombs fell on the grounds of the radar station and the adjoining grounds Katzenpfädchen - Lehmkaule but caused no military damage. The population was reportedly greatly disturbed by this event. Farmers who had worked in the fields saw flying bombers pass them, realized that they are in danger, and sought safety in an air raid shelter. In autumn of the same year, part of the harvesting took place in the dark, as the constant air raids made daytime fieldwork impossible. In September 1944, due to the advance of the Allied troops, the German soldiers withdrew from France and took up quarters in Dudeldorf. The soldiers erected a military hospital for horses. A few weeks later, these soldiers withdrew and Air Force soldiers took over with anti-aircraft guns to positions in Dudeldorf.

In the second week of September, the first columns of military workers arrived in Dudeldorf. They were housed in the castle and private homes, and built anti-tank ditches in Dudeldorf. On September 17, 1944, the local bell announced that a refugee train was leaving Philippsheim for the Reich. Unfortunately, few took advantage of this opportunity. As the Americans advanced ever closer, tank traps, trenches, and other defenses were built in large numbers. The number of German soldiers in the village grew. On New Year's Eve, the flak was attacked outside the village. Some of the bombs fell on the adjoining houses in Dudeldorf. Four bombs hit the long wall, killing four people and injuring two.

In the coming winter, soldiers withdrew from Dudeldorf; however, they lacked fuel and equipment, so they moved their belongings with horses and handcarts. As more and more poorly-equipped soldiers moved away and well-equipped Americans were advancing, people expected the worst. Guns were placed at high points in Dudeldorf. Low-flying aircraft attacked the ragged German soldiers. Bombs fell and artillery shells struck the village. From this point, basement shelters with beds and kitchen facilities became permanent residences.

Following the abrupt escape of the NS district leadership from Dudeldorf, the battle for the surrounding area began on 1 March 1945. Two days later, on 3 March 1945, the last German soldiers left Dudeldorf. In their retreat, the soldiers blew up two bridges connecting the lower village to the upper village, causing significant damage to nearby buildings. A few hours after the explosions, on the night of March 3 to 4, American troops moved into Dudeldorf, shooting phosphorus shells in their path and igniting several buildings. Amid the heavy attack, it was impossible to extinguish the burning dwellings; six Dudeldorfers died and two were injured in the attempt. On the morning of March 4, the first Americans attacked. They came from Gon and forced their way into the Upper Village, overtaking the village in a matter of minutes. The fighting in Dudeldorf lasted three days, ending on 7 March 1945, by which point the streets had been reduced to rubble.

=== Modern times ===
After World War II, in the mid-1950s and 1960s, the inner center of Dudeldorf flourished. The German economic miracle also affected Dudeldorf. In 1956, the Dudeldorf elementary school and settlement communities were built on Schulstrasse. Since 1970, Dudeldorf has belonged to the municipality of Bitburg-Land. Dudeldorf suffered from the demolition and the defacement of historic buildings in the 1960s and 1970s. In 1972, the Dudeldorf daycare center was built.

In 2011, Dudeldorf won the "Our Village has a Future" competition.

== Attractions ==
- Dudeldorf Castle
- Altes Brauhaus Dudeldorf

== Notable residents ==
- Edgar Schmitt, former German soccer player.
