= Ewa Chojecka =

Polish art historian (born 1933)

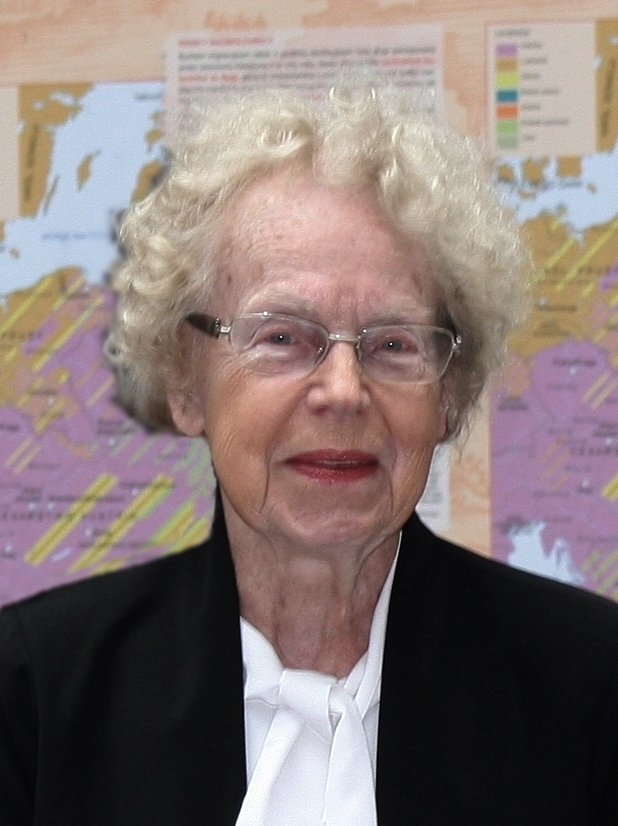

Ewa Sabine Chojecka (born 13 April 1933, in Bielsko-Biała) is a Polish art historian who served as chair of art history at the University of Silesia in Katowice from 1977 to 2003, and chairwoman of the Silesian Museum and the Bielsko-Biała Museum and Castle. She was awarded a Georg Dehio Cultural Prize in 2013, and invested with the Order of Polonia Restituta in 1989.
