= Dudeldorf Castle =

- Dudeldorf Palace, Nassau House
- Dudeldorf
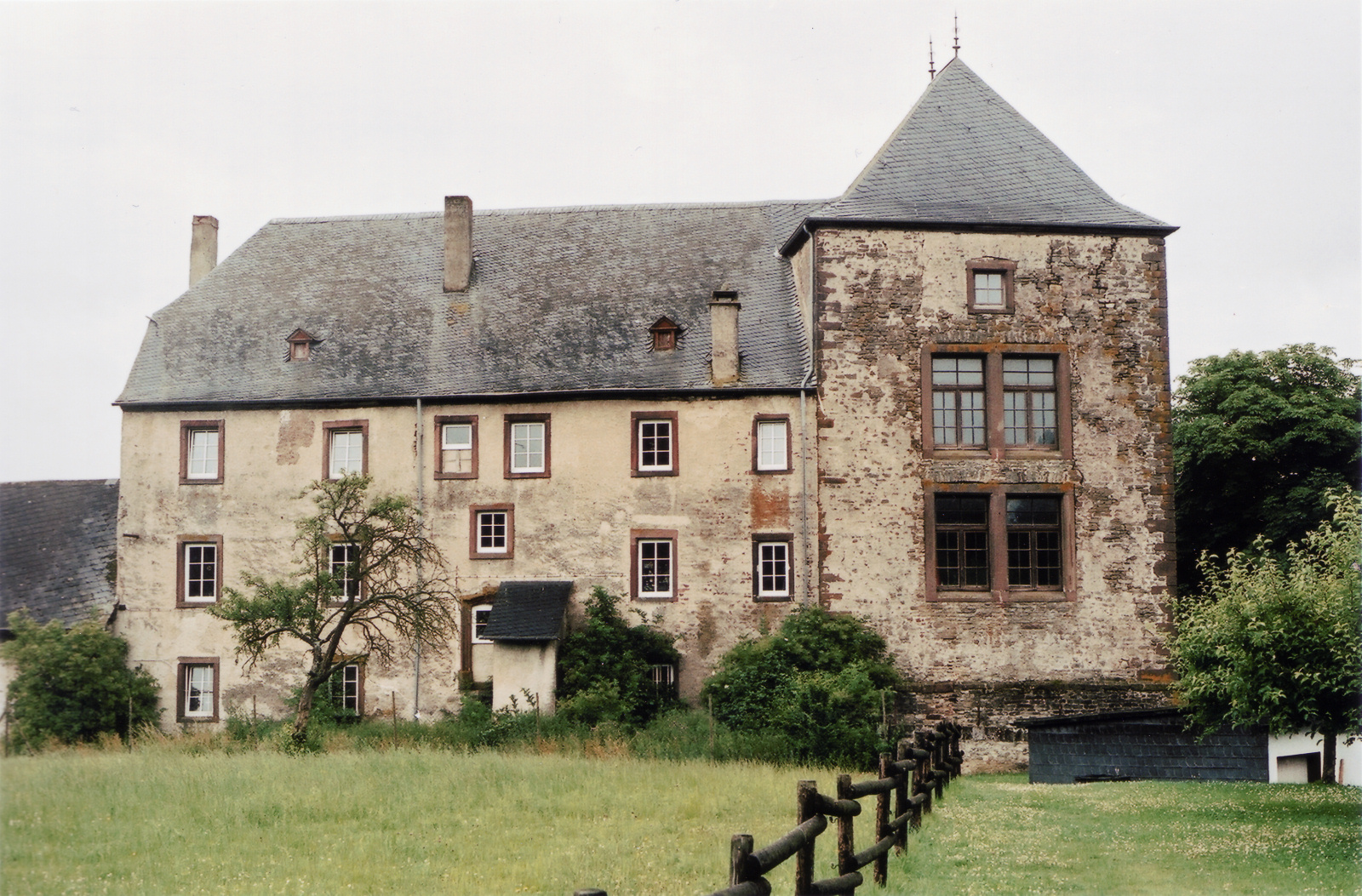
- The castle from northwest

Site information
- Type: Ortslage
- Code: DE-RP
- Condition: largely preserved

Location
- Coordinates: 49°58′30″N 6°38′11″E
- Height: 290 m above sea level (NN)

Site history
- Built: 1345

Garrison information
- Occupants: nobility

Dudeldorf Castle (German: Burg Dudeldorf) is the most important monument in the parish of Dudeldorf in the district of Bitburg-Prüm in the German state of Rhineland-Palatinate. The castle is in the northwest corner of the former village walls of Dudeldorf. It was built in 1345 and restored 1451–53.

== History ==
The original Dudeldorf Castle was built in the 12th century, although the exact date is not known. A lord of Dudeldorf is recorded in 1052. In the 14th century this aristocratic family became extinct.

The castle occupies the northern part of the village walls which also form the curtain walls of the castle. The overall site consists of the medieval tower house, which was converted into a school in the 19th century, the double-winged manor house, added in the 18th century, the courtyard with its archway and the garden and pavilion. The bergfried, which rises above a vaulted basement, bears the date 1734 at the level of the uppermost of its three floors. This was the year when it was repaired and marks the start of construction of the mansion by Balthasar Seberger, commissioned by Wolf Heinrich Gottfried Braun of Schmidtburg. His father Heinrich Gottfried bought the castle in 1701. It was out of this that Dudelsdorf House (Schloss Dudelsdorf) was created by Heinrich Braun of Schmidtburg in 1734–35, then called Nassau House (Nassauisches Haus). The second house appears in the Austrian cadastral map of 1766, used as a sheep barn because of its poor state of repair. The longer of the two rusticated ashlar wings is dated 1735 in an inscription over the middle one of its three transom windows (Oberlichtportale) below a double coat of arms. The southern wing was converted into a primary school in the first half of the 19th century, with an apartment for the schoolteacher. Further repairs were made in 1847, 1853 and 1886. A fireplace by the sandstone arches indicates that the entrance hall was once a hall kitchen (Flurküche). In the area of the ground floor—the former courtroom—is a shallow, carved rococo niche. On the second floor is a fireplace surround in 18th century style. On the capstone of the archway of the path leading from the village to the castle courtyard there is a ruined coat of arms dated 1715. By the garden wall an 18th garden house with a hip roof replaced in 1994–95 rises above the foundations of an outward-facing defensive tower. On its outer wall can still be areas of baroque window painting. In the Second World War the castle was used as a munitions depot by the Wehrmacht.

== Literature ==
- Georg Dehio: Handbuch der Deutschen Kunstdenkmäler. Rheinland-Pfalz. Deutscher Kunstverlag, Munich, 1984.
