= Thomas Urban =

German journalist

Thomas Urban (born 20 July 1954) is a German journalist and author of historical books.

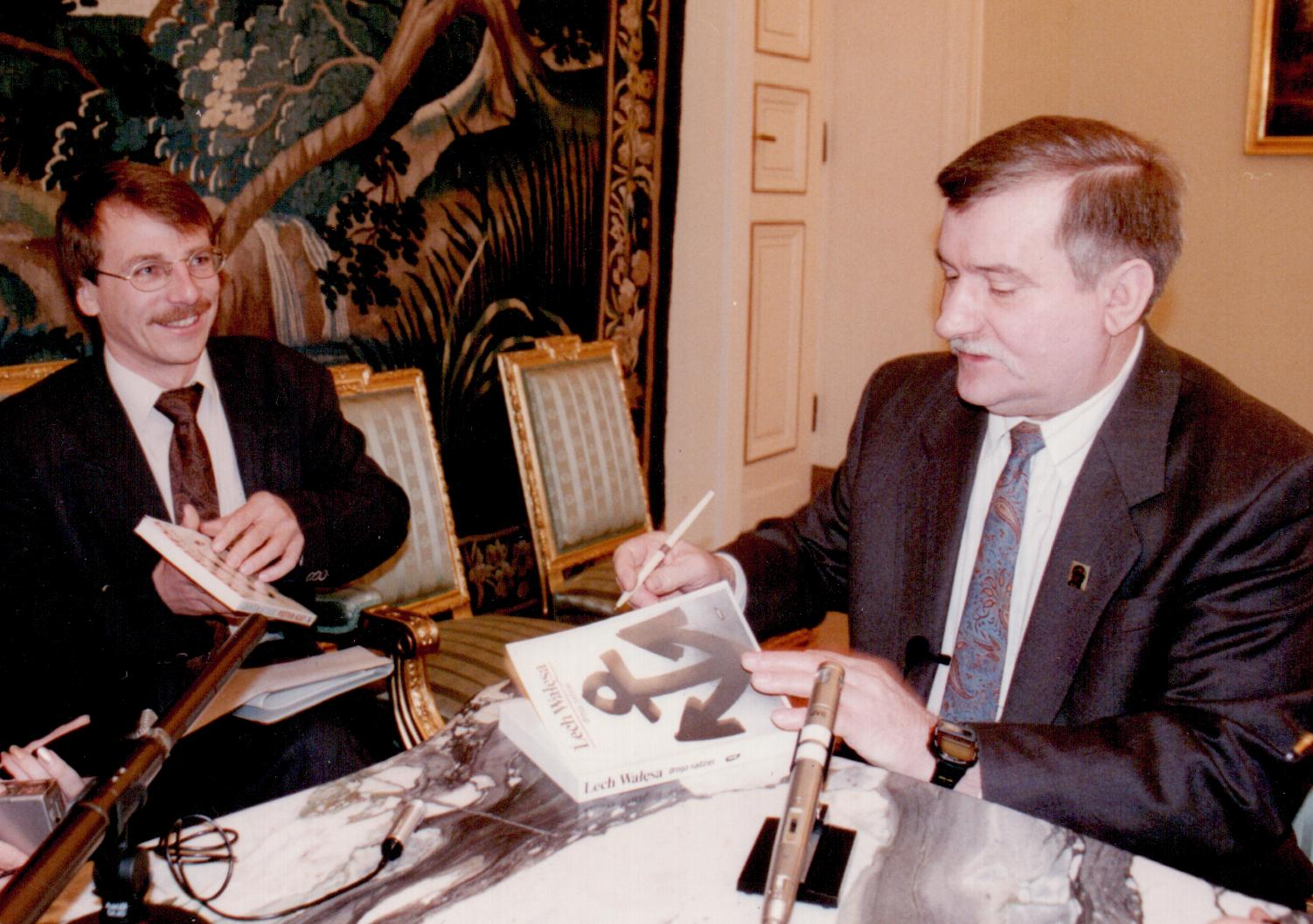
Thomas Urban (left) interviewing Lech Wałęsa (1992)

== Education ==
Urban was born in Leipzig. His parents were German expellees from Breslau, the capital of the Prussian province of Silesia, which came under Polish sovereignty in 1945. They first settled in the Soviet occupation zone from which the GDR emerged. When Urban was 15 months old, the family fled from the GDR to the Federal Republic of Germany.

Urban spent his school days in the industrial district of Bergheim, near Cologne, in the brown coal mining area on the left bank of the Rhine. After high school graduation (Abitur) he finished his military service in the Bundeswehr as an officer of the military reserve force.

He studied Romance and Slavic Studies, as well as the history of Eastern Europe at the University of Cologne. He received scholarships from the German Academic Exchange Service (DAAD) for semester studies at the University of Tours, the Taras Shevchenko National University of Kyiv and the Pushkin Institute in Moscow. His master's degree was devoted to writers of the Russian emigration in Paris in the 1920s.

In Cologne he became a collaborator of the dissident Lev Kopelev, who had been expatriated from the Soviet Union. In 1981/82 he received a DAAD scholarship for postgraduate studies at Lomonosov University in Moscow. As he had transported letters and medicines for dissidents, he was arrested by the KGB and deported. After returning from Moscow, he worked as a Russian teacher at the language school of the Bundeswehr.

== Journalism ==
In 1983 Urban left the civil service to attend the School of Journalism in Hamburg (Henri-Nannen-Schule), then worked for the news agencies Associated Press and Deutsche Presse-Agentur.

In 1987 he joined the editorial staff of the Süddeutsche Zeitung in Munich. From 1988 to 2012 he was the correspondent of this newspaper for Eastern Europe. Until 1992 he reported from Warsaw, where he followed the fall of the Polish United Workers' Party and the transition of the Polish economy. During this time he also worked for the American radio station RIAS, which broadcast a programme in German from West Berlin.

From 1992 to 1997, he was head of the Moscow office; he analysed the major changes under Boris Yeltsin and also wrote reports on the theatres of war in Abkhazia and Chechnya. From 1997 to 2012 he reported from Kiev, where he witnessed the Orange Revolution, and again from Warsaw, where he accompanied the rise of the Kaczyński twins.

From 2012 to 2020 Urban was the correspondent of the Süddeutsche Zeitung in Madrid. He also reported on new opera productions of the Teatro Real for the German magazine Opernwelt.

Since 2022 he is analyzing developments in the former Eastern Bloc for Cicero magazine.

== Books and essays ==
Urban is the author of popular scientific works and academic essays on the history of Eastern Europe. He paid special attention to German-Polish relations. He wrote a book on the German minority in Upper Silesia and another on mutual forced expulsions for which he won the Georg Dehio Book Prize. In a book series edited by former chancellor Helmut Schmidt and former president Richard von Weizsäcker on the relations of the Germans with their neighbours, he took over the volume on Poland.

His book on the murder of thousands of Polish officers by Stalin's secret police NKVD in the forest of Katyn was translated into English in an extended version. Another book on the great powers' propaganda war following the discovery of the mass graves in Katyn was published only in Polish. He is co-author of a biography of the Polish Pope John Paul II.

His second topic was Russian emigration. He dedicated a book to the Berlin years of the Russian-American writer Vladimir Nabokov and another to Russian writers who had emigrated to Berlin in the 1920s. He published essays on Boris Pasternak, Ilya Ehrenburg, Gaito Gazdanov and M. Ageyev.

His special interest was the political history of football in Eastern Europe. He published a book on the instrumentalisation of football players of the German and Polish national teams by their governments' propaganda. His analysis of the football ban in occupied Poland during World War II was also translated into English. During the Euro 2012 a trilingual exhibition (Polish, English, German) co-designed by Urban on the basis of the book was shown in the open air in the centre of Warsaw. In a video documentary he commented on the life of the German-Polish goal scorer Ernest Wilimowski.

On the occasion of Euro 2012, whose final was held in Kiev, he analysed Russian and Ukrainian publications on the alleged Death Match of 1942. He concluded that the previously propagated version (execution of Soviet footballers who had won against a Wehrmacht team in occupied Kiev) was a legend of Soviet propaganda. He also published texts on the fate of the famous football brothers Starostin in the Soviet Union in the Stalin era.

He is the author of a historical essay on the Russo-Ukrainian war. In a book published in 2022, he criticised Germany's Ostpolitik, which had made the politicians of the Federal Republic "blind to the black sides" of first the Soviet Union, then Vladimir Putin's Russia. In this way, Germany had made itself dependent on Russian energy sources.

== Bibliography ==
- Deutsche in Polen. Geschichte und Gegenwart einer Minderheit. Мunich 1993 ISBN 3-406-37402-6
- Polen. Мunich 1998 ISBN 3-406-39875-8
- Vladimir Nabokov — Blaue Abende in Berlin. Berlin 1999 ISBN 3-549-05777-6
- Von Krakau bis Danzig. Eine Reise durch die deutsch-polnische Geschichte. Munich 2000 ISBN 3-406-46766-0
- Russische Schriftsteller im Berlin der zwanziger Jahre. Berlin 2003 ISBN 3-89479-097-0
- Der Verlust. Die Vertreibung der Deutschen und der Polen im 20. Jahrhundert. Мunich 2004 ISBN 3-406-52172-X
- Polen. Ed.: Helmut Schmidt and Richard von Weizsäcker. Munich 2008 ISBN 978-3-406-57852-6
- Schwarze Adler, Weiße Adler. Deutsche und polnische Fußballer im Räderwerk der Politik. Göttingen 2011 ISBN 978-3-89533-775-8
- Katyn 1940. Geschichte eines Verbrechens. Munich 2015 ISBN 978-3-406-67366-5 (extended English edition: The Katyn Massacre 1940. History of a Crime. Barnsley 2020 ISBN 978-1-52677-535-1)
- Die Irrtümer des Kremls. Warum wir den Krieg im Osten Europas stoppen müssen. Munich 2015 ISBN 978-3-86497-300-0
- Katyń. Zbrodnia i walka propagandowa wielkich mocarstw. Warsaw 2019 ISBN 978-83-11-15361-5
- with Matthias Drobinski: Johannes Paul II. Der Papst, der aus dem Osten kam. Munich 2020 ISBN 978-3-406-74936-0
- Verstellter Blick. Die deutsche Ostpolitik. Berlin 2022 ISBN 978-3-949262-16-6
- Lexikon für Putin-Versteher. Legenden Lügen LGBT. Berlin 2023 ISBN 978-3-949262-34-0
