= Georg Dehio Book Prize =

- Location: Berlin
- Country: Germany
- Rewards: €7,000 (Grand Prize) €3,000 (Prize of Honor)
- First award: 2004
- Website: The Georg Dehio Book Prize

The Georg Dehio Book Prize (Georg Dehio-Buchpreis) is a biennial literary award for authors who, "in their literary, scholarly or public work, address the themes of the common culture and history of the German people and their Eastern neighbors at a high level and from a broad perspective." Described as "prestigious" by the Austrian state broadcasting system ORF, the Dehio Prize is funded by the German government through the Office of the Federal Commissioner for Culture and Media (Beauftragte der Bundesregierung for Kultur und Medien), the competition being administered by the German Cultural Forum for Eastern Europe (Deutsches Kulturforums östliches Europa), a state-endowed agency. It commemorates the Tallinn-born German art historian Georg Dehio (1850-1932), whose pioneering emphasis on multi-ethnic and transnational cultural interconnections and influences in Eastern Europe serves as a guiding principle for the work of the German Cultural Forum.

The prize comes in two categories: a Grand Prize of €7,000 and a Prize of Honor of €3,000. The Grand Prize honors an author's lifetime achievement in literary and/or public endeavors. The Prize of Honor is awarded in recognition of an outstanding published work. If the prizewinning publication is a translation, the prize may be shared between the author and the translator. The Georg Dehio Book Prize began in 2004, and is awarded every other year, alternating with the Georg Dehio Cultural Prize, which was first offered in 2003.

Winners of the Georg Dehio Book Prize are chosen by a selection committee whose members are appointed by the Board of Trustees of the German Cultural Forum on the nomination of its executive committee. It is composed of renowned personalities from the fields of literary studies, publishing and the media. Permanent members of the Selection Committee include a representative of the Office of the Federal Commissioner for Culture and Media (BKM) and a representative of the BKM-funded institutions concerned with the culture and history of the German-speaking peoples of Eastern Europe.

== Winners ==
- 2024: Ulrike Draesner (Grand Prize); Karolina Kuszyk and her translator Bernhard Hartmann (Prize of Honor for In den Häusern der anderen. Spuren deutscher Vergangenheit in Westpolen)
- 2022: Michael Zeller (Grand Prize); Vasco Kretschmann (Prize of Honor for Breslau museal. Deutsche und polnische Geschichtsausstellungen 1900 bis 2010)
- 2020: Ulla Lachauer (Grand Prize); Gusel Jachina and the translator Helmut Ettinger for the novel Wolgakinder (Prize of Honor)
- 2018: Miljenko Jergović and Brigitte Döbert (Grand Prize); Alvydas Šlepikas and Markus Roduner for Mein Name ist Marytė
- 2016: Marek Krajewski (Grand Prize); Cord Aschenbrenner (Prize of Honor for Das evangelische Pfarrhaus. 300 Jahre Glaube, Geist und Macht: eine Familiengeschichte)
- 2014: Barbara Coudenhove-Kalergi (Grand Prize); Raymond M. Douglas (Prize of Honor for Ordnungsgemäße Überführung. Die Vertreibung der Deutschen nach dem Zweiten Weltkrieg)
- 2012: Peter Demetz (Grand Prize); Radka Denemarková and Eva Profousová (Prize of Honor as author and translator respectively for Ein herrlicher Flecken Erde)
- 2010: Martin Pollack (Grand Prize); Włodzimierz Nowak and Joanna Manc (Prize of Honor as author and translator respectively for Die Nacht von Wildenhagen: Zwölf deutsch-polnische Schicksale)
- 2008: Richard Wagner (Grand Prize); Andreas Kossert (Prize of Honor for Ostpreußen: Geschichte und Mythos)
- 2006: Karl-Markus Gauß (Grand Prize); Thomas Urban (Prize of Honor for Verlust: Die Vertreibung der Deutschen und Polen im 20. Jahrhundert)
- 2004: Karl Schlögel (Grand Prize); Gregor Thum (Prize of Honor for Die fremde Stadt. Breslau 1945)

== See also ==
- Georg Dehio Cultural Prize
