= Georg Dehio =

Baltic German art historian (1850–1932)

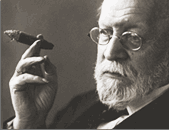
Georg Dehio

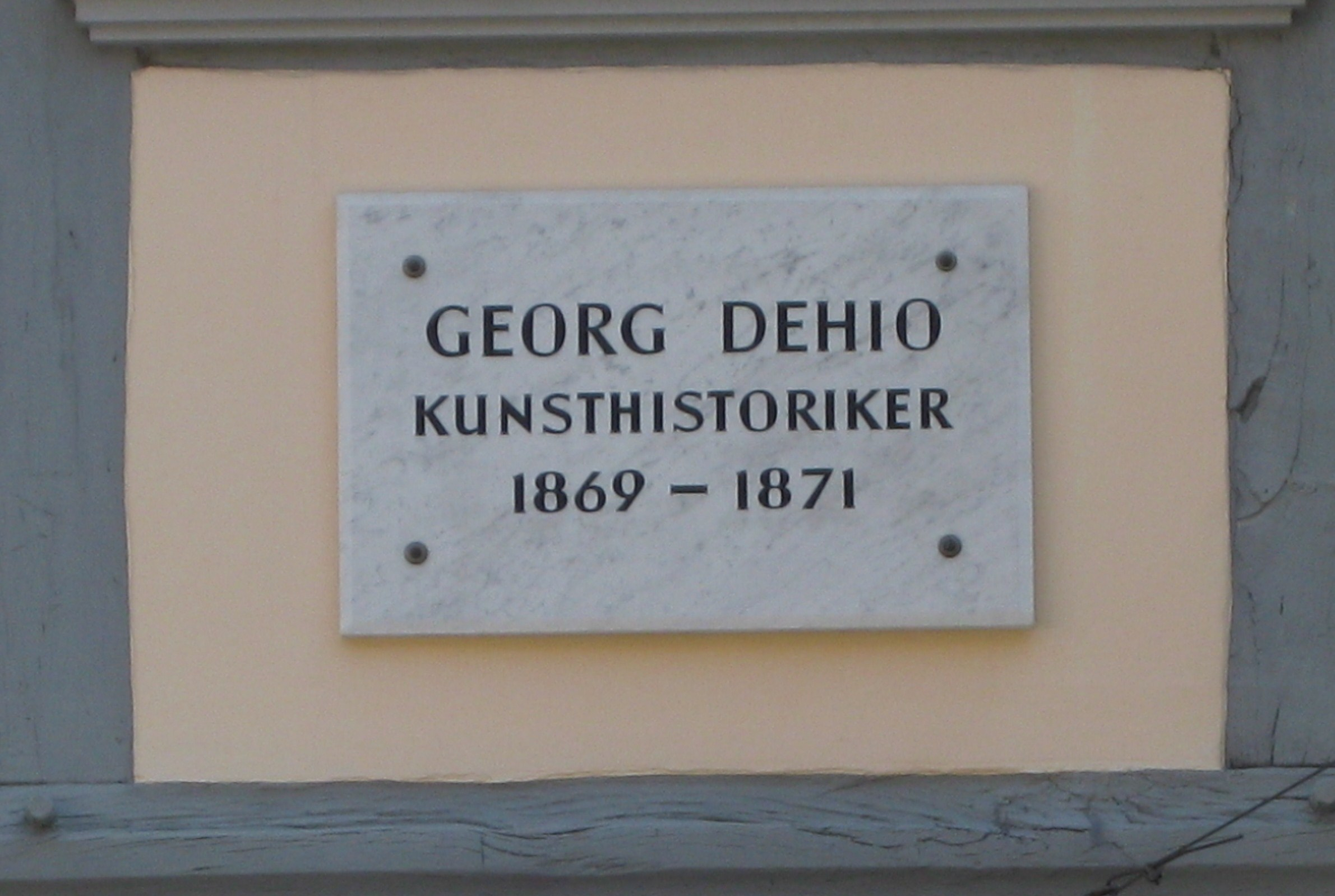

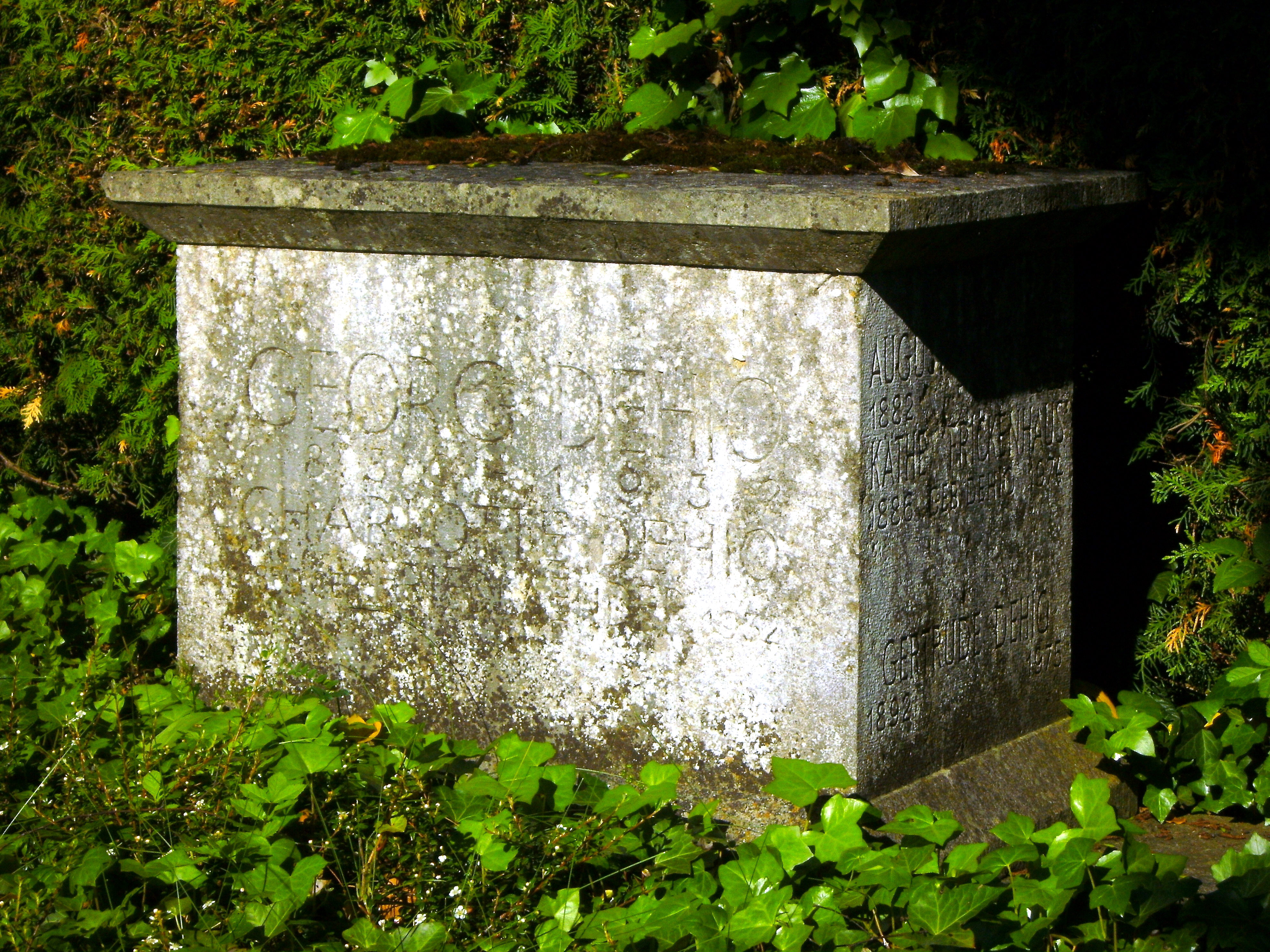
Grave of Georg Dehio in Tübingen.

Georg Gottfried Julius Dehio (22 November 1850 – 21 March 1932), was a Baltic German art historian.

In 1900, Dehio started the "Handbuch der deutschen Kunstgeschichte" (Handbook of German Art History), published by Ernst Wasmuth. The project is ongoing and managed by the 'Dehio-Vereinigung', Munich. He gave his name to the Georg Dehio Prize (Georg Dehio Book Prize).

Dehio was born in Reval (Tallinn), then part of the Russian Empire. He died in Tübingen, Germany.

He was laureate of the Pour le Mérite order ("Pour le Mérite für Wissenschaften und Künste"), the Eagle Shield of the German Empire (Adlerschild des Deutschen Reiches) and the Bavarian Maximilian Order for Science and Art. He held honorary doctor titles in Göttingen, Tübingen, Frankfurt (Main) and Darmstadt. The minor planet 48415 Dehio discovered circa 1987, is named after him.

== See also ==
- Karl Gottfried Konstantin Dehio (27 May 1851, Reval (Tallinn) – 26 February 1927, Dorpat (Tartu)), internist, cousin
- Ludwig Dehio (25 August 1888, Königsberg, Prussia – 24 October 1963, Marburg/Lahn), historian, his son
- Erhard Arnold Julius Dehio (16 January 1855, Reval (Tallinn) – 12 July 1940, Bad Oeynhausen), last German mayor of Reval, Georg's younger brother
- Georg Dehio Book Prize
- Georg Dehio Cultural Prize
