= Otto Brahm =

German drama and literary critic, theatre manager and director

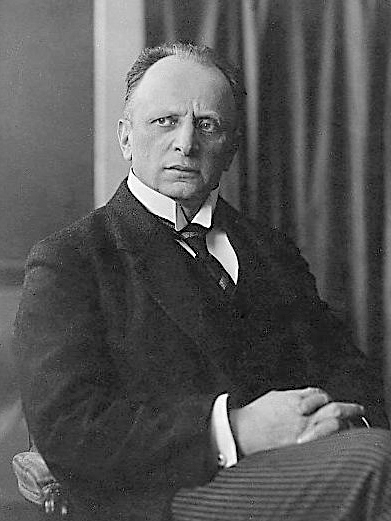
- Brahm in 1905
- Born: Otto Abrahamson; 5 February 1856; Hamburg, German Confederation
- Died: 28 November 1912 (aged 56); Berlin, Weimar Germany
- Occupations: Critic, theatre manager, director

Otto Brahm (born Otto Abrahamsohn; 5 February 1856 – 28 November 1912) was a German drama and literary critic, theatre manager and director. His productions were noted for being accurate and realistic.

Brahm also managed the Deutsches Theater in Berlin, and was responsible for modernising its output.

== See also ==
- Oskar Seidlin
