= Marek Krajewski =

Polish writer and linguist (born 1966)

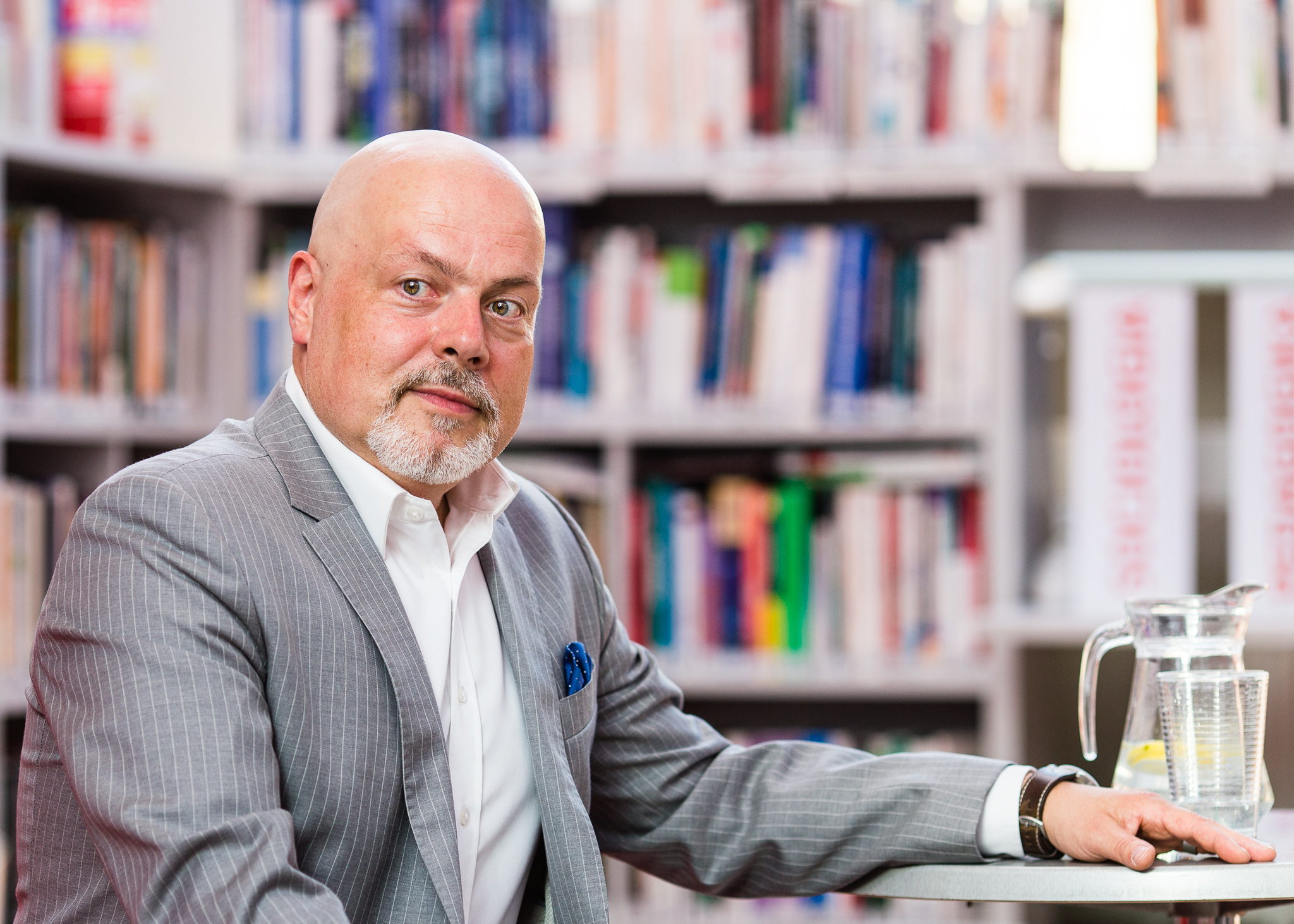
- Born: 4 September 1966 (age 59); Wrocław
- Citizenship: Polish
- Education: University of Wrocław
- Occupations: writer, linguist
- Writing career
- Genre: crime fiction
- Notable awards: Georg Dehio Book Prize (2016); Medal for Merit to Culture – Gloria Artis (2015); Paszport Polityki (2005)

Marek Krajewski (born 4 September 1966, in Wrocław) is a Polish crime writer and linguist.

He is best known for his series of novels set in pre-war Wrocław (known at the time by its German name Breslau) with the policeman Eberhard Mock as the protagonist. His novels have been translated into 20 languages including English, Spanish, French, German, Italian, Dutch, Hebrew, Greek, Swedish and Russian.

== Life and career ==
He was born in Wrocław, Polish People's Republic. In 1985, he graduated from the Juliusz Słowacki High School No. 9 in Wrocław. Between 1985 and 1991 he studied classics at the University of Wrocław. In 1992, he obtained an MA degree and in 1999, he received a doctoral degree. He worked as a librarian and later as an assistant professor and lecturer at the Institute of Classical Philology and Ancient Culture of the University of Wrocław. Since 2007, he has focused on pursuing his professional career as a writer of primarily crime fiction.

In 2005, he was the recipient of the Paszport Polityki Award presented by the Polityka magazine. His other awards include the High Calibre Award (Polish: Nagroda Wielkiego Kalibru), the Witryna Award conferred by Polish booksellers and the Book Institute Award for best Polish crime novel. In 2015, he was awarded Silver Medal for Merit to Culture – Gloria Artis. In 2016, he also won the Georg Dehio Book Prize – a prize which recognizes authors who "in their literary, scholarly or public work, address the themes of the common culture and history of the German people and their Eastern neighbors at a high level and from a broad perspective."

In 2018, Polish filmmaker Patryk Vega directed a crime thriller The Plagues of Breslau, which is loosely based on a series of crime novels by Krajewski.

In 2019, he received the Medal of the 100th Anniversary of Regaining Independence conferred by the President of Poland Andrzej Duda to individuals with significant contributions to Polish culture. The same year, the Wrocław-based Capitol Theatre staged for the first time a musical entitled Mock. Czarna burleska (Mock. Burlesque Noir) directed by Konrad Imiela and inspired by Krajewski's novels revolving around the main character - Eberhard Mock.

In 2023, he was awarded the title of an honorary citizen of the city of Wrocław.

== Novels ==
=== Eberhard Mock series ===
- Death in Breslau (Śmierć w Breslau), 1999, ISBN 1-84724-518-8. English edition: MacLehose Press/Quercus, London 2008; Melville House, New York, 2012, ISBN 978-1-61219-164-5
- The End of the World in Breslau (Koniec świata w Breslau), 2003. English edition: MacLehose Press/Quercus, London 2009; Melville House, New York, 2013, ISBN 978-1-61219-177-5
- Phantoms in Breslau (Widma w mieście Breslau), 2005. English edition: MacLehose Press/Quercus, London 2010.
- Fortress Breslau (Festung Breslau), 2006
- Plague in Breslau (Dżuma w Breslau), 2007
- The Minotaur's Head (Głowa Minotaura), 2009. English edition: MacLehose Press/Quercus, London 2012.
- Mock, Znak 2016
- The Human Zoo (Ludzkie zoo), Znak 2017
- The Duel (Pojedynek), Znak 2018
- Golem, Znak 2019
- Moloch, Znak 2020
- Diabeł stróż (Guardian Devil), Znak 2021
- Błaganie o śmierć (Begging for Death), Znak 2022

=== Jarosław Pater series ===
- Suicide Avenue (Aleja samobójców), 2008
- Cemetery Roses (Róże cmentarne), 2009

=== Edward Popielski series ===
- The Minotaur's Head (Głowa Minotaura), 2009. English edition: MacLehose Press/Quercus, London 2012.
- Erinyes (Erynie), Znak 2010
- Charon's Numbers (Liczby Charona), Znak 2011
- The Rivers of Hades (Rzeki Hadesu), Znak 2012
- In the Depths of Darkness (W otchłani mroku), Znak 2013
- The Lord of the Numbers (Władca liczb), Znak 2014
- The Arena of Rats (Arena szczurów), Znak 2015
- The Girl with Four Fingers (Dziewczyna o czterech palcach), Znak 2019
- The Executioner's Assistant (Pomocnik kata), Znak 2020
- The City of Spies (Miasto szpiegów), Znak 2021
- Time of Traitors (Czas zdrajców), Znak 2022
- Parasite (Pasożyt), Znak 2023

=== Other ===
- The Dead Have a Voice (Umarli mają głos), co-written with Jerzy Kawecki, Znak 2015
- Demonomachia, Znak 2022
