= Georg Dehio Cultural Prize =

- Location: Berlin
- Country: Germany
- Rewards: €7,000 (Grand Prize) €3,000 (Prize of Honor)
- First award: 2003
- Website: The Georg Dehio Cultural Prize

The Georg Dehio Cultural Prize (Georg Dehio-Kulturpreis) is a biennial award, funded by the German government's Office of the Federal Commissioner for Culture and Media (Beauftragte der Bundesregierung for Kultur und Medien), and administered by the German Cultural Forum for Eastern Europe.

Recipients are recognized for work that promotes German cultural expression in Eastern Europe; critically engages the cultural interactions between Germany and its eastern neighbours; or contributes to reconciliation and mutual understanding between peoples in the areas of former German settlement. Described as "prestigious" by German press and television sources, the award is named after Georg Dehio, an Estonian-born German art historian of the nineteenth century whose emphasis on the national and ethnic heterogeneity and interdependence of the region has been taken as a guiding principle for the German Cultural Forum's work.

The prize, first granted in 2003, is awarded in alternate years with the Georg Dehio Book Prize, being offered in odd-numbered years. Two categories of award are made: a Grand Prize, which carries a cash value of €7,000, and a Prize of Honor of €3,000. Corporate bodies as well as individuals are eligible. A seven-person international jury, drawn from the fields of art history, historical preservation, museum administration, and culture, selects the winners. Jurors serve for a maximum of two terms, with the exception of a representative of the German Federal Commissioner for Culture and Media, the sole permanent member. The jury may not nominate prospective honorees, nor are self-nominations permitted.

== Winners ==
- 2013: Ewa Chojecka (Grand Prize); Irina Tscherkasjanowa (Prize of Honor)
- 2011: Christoph Klein (Grand Prize); Jan Janca (Prize of Honor)
- 2009: Christoph Machat (Grand Prize); Zbigniew Czarnuch (Prize of Honor)
- 2007: Imants Lancmanis (Grand Prize); the editorial staff of Dialog (Prize of Honor)
- 2005: Volker Koepp (Grand Prize); Antikomplex (Czech historical society) (Prize of Honor)
- 2003: Andrzej Tomaszewski (Grand Prize); Hermannstädter Bachchor (Prize of Honor)

== See also ==
- Georg Dehio Book Prize
