= Stefan Brockhoff =

Stefan Brockhoff was a pseudonym used collectively by a group of three German co-authors: Dieter Cunz, Richard Plant, and Oskar Seidlin. As Stefan Brockhoff, they wrote multiple highly successful detective novels, three published in Nazi Germany and at least one published in postwar Germany.

== Authors ==
Cunz, Plant, and Seidlin were each born in Germany at or about the beginning of the second decade of the twentieth century. At one point or another they all of them became refugees from Nazism. They all eventually lived out their lives in the United States of America. For each of them, the writing of detective novels was a youthful avocation; their principal interests and activities in later life lay in different areas.

== Novels ==
- Stefan Brockhoff, Schuß auf die Bühne (Shot on Stage) (Leipzig, Wilhelm Goldmann Verlag, 1935)
- Stefan Brockhoff, Musik im Totengässlein (Music in Totengässlein) (Bern, etc., Goldmann, 1936)
- Stefan Brockhoff, Drei Kioske am See (Three Kiosks by the Lake) (Leipzig, Goldmann, 1937)
- Stefan Brockhoff, Begegnung in Zermatt (Encounter in Zermatt) (Munich, Goldmann, 1955)

A fifth novel, entitled Verwirrung um Veronika, is said to have been serialized in the Zürcher Illustrierte in 1938. Cf. Angelika Jockers and Reinhard Jahn, eds., Lexikon der deutschsprachigen Krimi-Autoren (2nd ed., rev.; Munich, Verlag der Criminale, 2005). This attribution has not been independently corroborated.
