= Bernhard Blume (writer) =

German-American academic (1901 – 1978)

- Born: 7 April 1901; Stuttgart, Kingdom of Württemberg, German Empire
- Died: 22 July 1978 (aged 77); La Jolla, California, U.S.
- Education: Technische Hochschule Stuttgart
- Occupations: Professor of German, author
- Years active: 1923–1978
- Spouse: Carola Rosenberg-Blume
- Awards: Goethe Medal in Gold (1963); Fellow, American Academy of Arts & Sciences (1976); Member, Deutsche Akademie für Sprache und Dichtung (1983)

External image
- Portrait photograph of Bernhard Blume on the dustjacket of his autobiography.

Bernhard Blume (7 April 1901 – 22 July 1978) was an emigre from Nazi Germany who became a professor of German literature at Mills College, Ohio State University, Harvard University, and the University of California, San Diego. In addition to scholarly works, he authored several plays, a novel, and an autobiography.

== Early years in Germany ==
Blume was born in Swabia to north German parents, Hedwig (née Grabowsky) and Paul Blume. He was five when the family moved to Silesia, where his father (1873–1931) worked at the Waggon- und Maschinenbau Görlitz, noted for the construction of railroad cars. Five years later, when his father lost his position due to excessive drinking, the family relocated for a time from Görlitz to Bremerhaven and Hanover before finally settling in Esslingen am Neckar, where his father was employed until his death as a section chief at the Maschinenfabrik Esslingen. His widowed mother (1876–1949) remained in Esslingen until the family home was bombed out in World War II.

Blume attended the humanities-focused Realgymnasium in Esslingen and during these years saw performances of Friedrich Schiller’s The Robbers, Gotthold Ephraim Lessing’s Nathan the Wise, and Heinrich von Kleist’s Prince Friedrich von Homburg at the Hoftheater in Stuttgart which he reenacted at home with a puppet theater for his younger brother. He participated in the Wandervogel movement and continued hiking with friends after passing the Reifeprüfung and taking up university studies. From 1919 to 1923, he matriculated at the Ludwig-Maximilians-Universität München, the Friedrich Wilhelm University of Berlin, and the University of Tübingen, attending lectures by noted academics including Ernst Troeltsch, Eduard Spranger, and Heinrich Wölfflin. His coursework focused on Germanic and modern Romance languages and literatures, and among his Romance philology professors were Karl Vossler and the linguist Josef Haas, in whose house he lived for a time and whose approach to scholarship was a profound influence.

Blume passed the Dienstprüfung required to embark upon a career in secondary education and also completed the probationary period of teaching in Stuttgart, but he was drawn to the theater and at age 22 made a career change. His first play, Tamango, based on a Prosper Mérimée novella about the 18th-century slave trade, was written while he was still a student and staged in Stuttgart. In 1923–24 he worked in Beuthen as dramaturge for the Upper Silesian Tri-City Theater (Beuthen - Gleiwitz - Hindenburg) and then was appointed dramaturge of the Stuttgart State Theater.

Residing in Degerloch, an outer district of Stuttgart, he authored Fahrt nach der Südsee (1924), which premiered simultaneously at the Mannheim National Theatre and Staatstheater Berlin in 1925. His play Bonaparte (1926) was an even greater success and premiered simultaneously at the Staatstheater am Gärtnerplatz in Munich, Stuttgart, the Hessisches Staatstheater Wiesbaden in Wiesbaden, and Hanover. In the following years, his most widely produced plays were Treibjagd (1927), the comedy Feurio! (1928), and the comedy Gelegenheit macht Diebe (1930). He also authored a documentary drama about the trial of Sacco and Vanzetti, Im Namen des Volkes (1930), which premiered in Leipzig. He was hailed as one of Germany's most promising young playwrights, one of the "five B's" (Brecht, Bruckner, Bronnen, Barlach, and Blume). His plays were strongly influenced by the works of Georg Büchner, Frank Wedekind, and Arthur Schnitzler. During these years Blume authored short newspaper and journal articles about Kleist, Klabund, Bruckner, Franz Grillparzer, Gerhart Hauptmann, and Anna Seghers.

In 1927, Blume married Carola Rosenberg (1899–1987), who came from a Neudenau Jewish family with deep roots in Swabia and with whom he had two sons, Michael Wolfgang (1929–1994) and Frank Reinhart (1932–1998). In 1931, Blume enrolled at the Technische Hochschule Stuttgart and attended courses on German literature taught by Hermann Pongs and on psychology taught by Fritz Giese.

On 1 April 1933, two months after the Nazi party's accession to power, Carola Rosenberg-Blume was dismissed from her position as head of the women's division of the Stuttgart Volkshochschule on grounds both of race and her leftist political stance. For a few years Blume was able to continue as a playwright, but Nazi racial laws were tightened and he was finally subject to an official boycott of his plays because he was “related by marriage to a non-Aryan”. In 1934 Schatzgräber und Matrosen (1933), based on Robert Louis Stevenson’s Treasure Island, premiered in Berlin. His Die Schwertbrüder (1934), based on Schiller's Die Malteser, was staged in Karlsruhe in 1935. In 1936 he published a historical novel, Das Wirtshaus zum roten Husaren, set in the Austria of the Turkish Wars. He also published articles on Schiller and Arthur Rimbaud.

Continuing to live in Germany became increasingly untenable, and in order to prepare for emigration and a career change, Blume completed a doctorate with a dissertation on the nihilistic world view of Arthur Schnitzler, defended in June 1935. Blume's thesis director was the strongly pro-Nazi Hermann Pongs, and Blume hewed to the Nazi line by characterizing nihilism in Nietzschean terms as a psychological manifestation of bourgeois decay.

At the end of November 1935, Carola Rosenberg-Blume traveled to the United States, and she returned to Germany two months later with a one-year job contract for Bernhard Blume at Mills College, a one-year research contract for herself, and visa application affidavits for the family. The very next day the family went to the American consulate, and on 30 April 1936 they disembarked from the SS George Washington in New York.

== Later years in the United States ==
Filling the faculty position at Mills College formerly held by Theodore Brohm, Blume not only headed the German program but would eventually reorganize the general curriculum in modern European literature. His wife also taught adult education courses from time to time, without a full-time appointment. In 1936 he sent a letter to the Reich Chamber of Literature to protest his expulsion. Blume's political outlook gradually shifted from the Nietzschean nihilism of his early years to a democratic liberalism informed by Thomas Mann’s simultaneous transformation. In addition to teaching, Blume delivered public lectures on Hitler’s Mein Kampf and Hermann Rauschning’s nihilism; he also authored articles on Thomas Mann, Goethe, Kleist, and Rainer Maria Rilke. In 1942 he was naturalized as a U.S. citizen. Carola Rosenberg-Blume's father and other relatives were killed in Nazi extermination camps.

In 1945, Blume was tapped to chair the German Department at Ohio State University. The faculty position he vacated at Mills was filled by Olga Schnitzler, who had been married to Arthur Schnitzler from 1903 to 1921. At Ohio State Blume faced the administrative challenge of a temporary enrollment bulge caused by the G.I. Bill, necessitating the recruitment of additional teaching staff. Oskar Seidlin would prove to be his most consequential new hire. Blume continued to publish on Lessing, Goethe, Kleist, Mann, Rimbaud, Rilke, Elisabeth Langgässer, Hugo von Hofmannsthal, and Hermann Hesse. Carola Rosenberg-Blume completed a Ph.D. in clinical psychology in 1949 and was employed as a psychologist at the Bureau of Juvenile Research in Columbus, where she worked on rehabilitating underage offenders.

In 1955, he accepted an appointment at Harvard University, where he held the prestigious Kuno Francke Professorship of German Art and Culture until retiring with emeritus status in 1966. During these years he published articles on Mann, Schnitzler, Rilke, Brecht, Friedrich Gottlieb Klopstock, Charles Baudelaire, and Wilhelm Busch.

At age 65, Blume accepted a final academic appointment as the first professor of German in the Department of Literature at the newly founded University of California, San Diego. He survived two heart attacks at age 68. He taught at San Diego for five years until fully retiring in 1971. During these years he published articles on Kleist, Goethe, and Mann.

Following retirement he remained active up to the time of his death at age 77, coediting with Henry J. Schmidt of Ohio State University a textbook for undergraduate students, German Literature: Texts and Contexts (1974), as well as a volume of Rilke's correspondence with Sidonie Nádherná von Borutín (1973) and working on an autobiography, which was published posthumously under the title Narziß mit Brille (1985; English translation 1992). A posthumous collection of his essays, Existenz und Dichtung (1980), assembles seven articles on the motific cluster of ship – water – island – shipwreck as well as six essays on Rilke.

== Awards and honors ==
Blume was a Guggenheim Fellow twice, in 1954-55 and 1963–64. In 1957, he was named a member of the Deutsche Akademie für Sprache und Dichtung. The Goethe-Gesellschaft in Weimar awarded him the Goethe Medal in Gold in 1964, and in 1970 he was named a Fellow of the American Academy of Arts and Sciences. He was the recipient of two honorary doctorates, an LLD from Mills College in 1965 and a Litt.D. from Washington University in St. Louis in 1972, as well as an honorary A.M. degree from Harvard in 1956. His colleagues honored him with a Festschrift in 1967, and colleagues and former students established the Bernhard Blume Awards for Excellence in German Studies for undergraduate and graduate students at Harvard, with an endowment by the Grubb Foundation.

== Publications ==
- Fahrt nach der Südsee. Ein Stück in 3 Akten. Munich: Georg Müller, 1924.
- Bonaparte. Ein Stück in 3 Akten. Munich: Georg Müller, 1926.
- Treibjagd. Ein Stück in 3 Akten. Munich: Georg Müller, 1927.
- Feurio! Ein Lustspiel. Stuttgart: Chronos, 1928.
  - Fürio! Dialektschwank in 7 Bildern. Schweizerische Dialektbearbeitung. Aarau: H. R. Sauerländer, 1930.
- Im Namen des Volkes! Ein Stück. Stuttgart: Chronos, 1929.
- Gelegenheit macht Diebe. Ein Lustspiel in 3 Akten. Nach einer Erzählung von Marcel Achard. Stuttgart: Chronos, 1930.
- Schatzgräber und Matrosen. Ein Stück in 3 Akten. Nach Robert Louis Stevensons Erzählung «Die Schatzinsel». Leipzig: Dietzmann, 1933.
- Die Schwertbrüder. Ein Schauspiel in drei Akten. Leipzig: Dietzmann, 1935.
- Das Wirtshaus zum roten Husaren. Berlin: Schützen, 1936.
  - Also as Das Wirtshaus »Zum roten Husaren«. Frankfurt am Main: Wolfgang Krüger / Stuttgart: Verlag der Europäischen Bildungsgemeinschaft, 1976.
- Das nihilistische Weltbild Arthur Schnitzlers. Stuttgart: Knöller, 1936.
- Hitler’s »Mein Kampf«. Oakland: Eucalyptus, 1939. 13 pp.
- The Revolution of Nihilism: An Interpretation of the Works of Hermann Rauschning. Oakland: Eucalyptus, 1942. 17 pp.
- Thomas Mann und Goethe. Bern: Francke, 1949.
- Aufsätze aus dem »Stuttgarter Neuen Tagblatt« und der »Stuttgarter Zeitung«, 1933–1966. Stuttgart: Turmhaus, n.d. 49 pp.
- (Ed.) Sigurd Burckhardt. The Drama of Language: Essays on Goethe and Kleist. Baltimore: Johns Hopkins Press, 1970.
- (Ed.) Rainer Maria Rilke. Briefe an Sidonie Nádherný von Borutin. Frankfurt am Main: Insel, 1973.
- (Ed., with Henry J. Schmidt.) German Literature: Texts and Contexts. New York: McGraw-Hill, 1974.
- Existenz und Dichtung. Essays und Aufsätze. Ed. Egon Schwarz. Frankfurt am Main: Insel, 1980.
- Narziß mit Brille. Kapitel einer Autobiographie. Ed. Egon Schwarz and Fritz Martini. Heidelberg: Lambert Schneider, 1985.
  - A Life in Two Worlds: An Experiment in Autobiography. Ed. Michael Blume. Transl. Hunter and Hildegarde Hannum. New York: Peter Lang, 1992.
