= Eduard Hoffmann-Krayer =

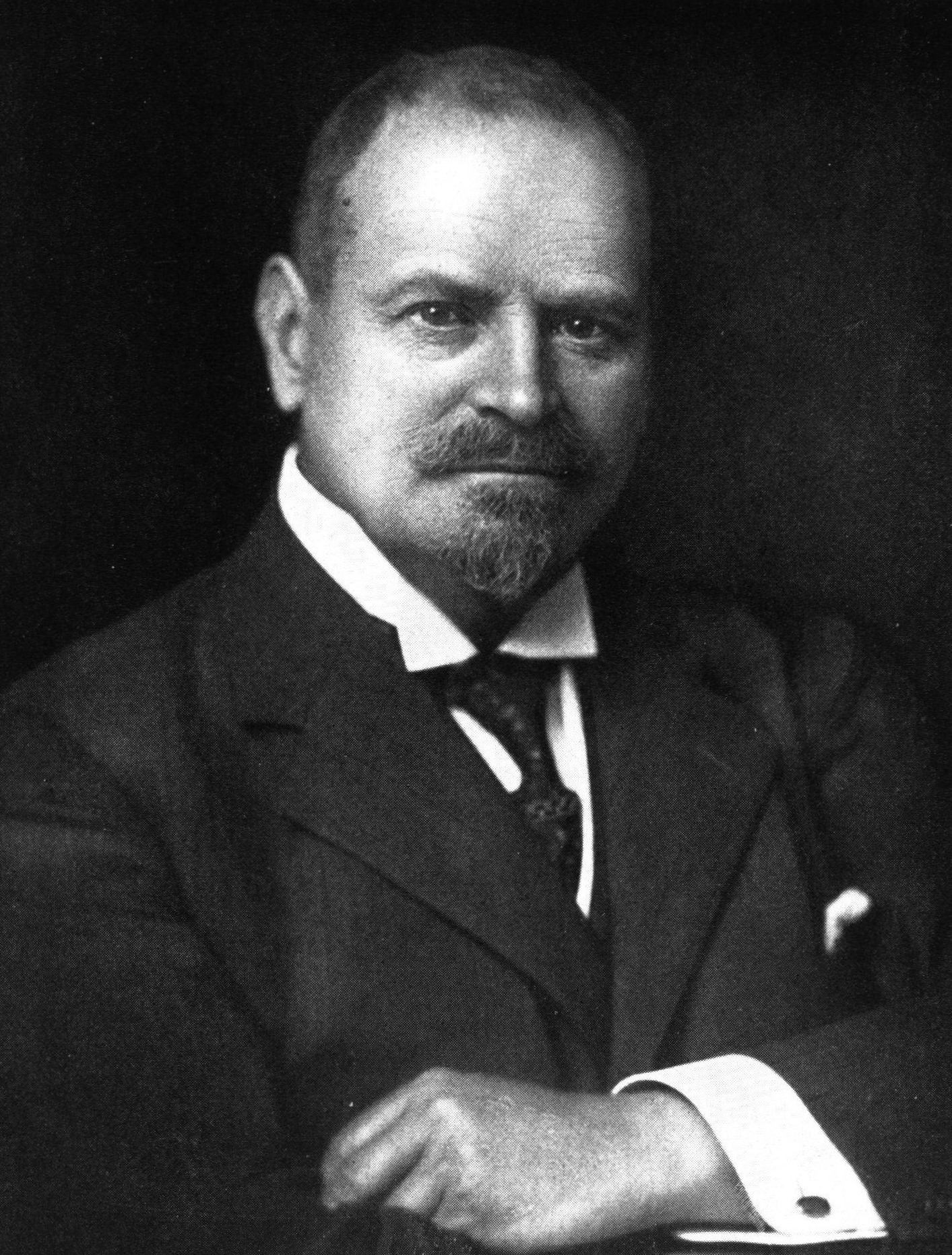
1934 portrait of Eduard Hoffman-Krayer, Schweizerischen Archiv für Volkskunde Band XXXIII (1934) Heft 3/4.

Eduard Hoffmann-Krayer (1864–1936) was a Swiss folklorist, Germanist and medievalist, from 1900 professor for phonetics, Swiss dialectology and folklore at the University of Basel and founder of the Schweizerische Gesellschaft für Volkskunde in 1896. His 1902 essay Die Volkskunde als Wissenschaft ("Folkloristics as Science") received international attention.

== Bibliography ==
- 1913, Feste und Bräuche des Schweizervolkes. Schultheß, Zürich. revised ed. by P. Geiger, 1940, reprint Olms, Heidelberg 1992, ISBN 3-283-00249-5.
- 1926, Geschichte des deutschen Stils in Einzelbildern. Quelle & Meyer, Leipzig.
- ed. P. Geiger, Kleine Schriften zur Volkskunde. . Krebs, Basel 1946.

== Sources ==
- Danièle Lenzin: Folklore vivat, crescat, floreat! Über die Anfänge der wissenschaftlichen Volkskunde in der Schweiz um 1900. Zürich 1996, ISBN 3-9521084-2-1
- Albert Emanuel Hoffmann: Zum Kaufmann bin ich nicht geboren – gewiss nicht. 2 vols. Limmat, Zürich 1998, ISBN 3-85791-305-3
- Hoffmann(-Krayer), Eduard in German, French and Italian in the online Historical Dictionary of Switzerland.
