= List of novels written by multiple authors =

This is a list of novels written by multiple authors (or collaborative novels). These novels are works of collaborative fiction, written using one or more of the types of collaborative writing. The list is limited to novels deemed notable by Wikipedia and/or novels with at least one notable author or notable pen name.

== Novels written under collective pen names ==
The following books and book series were written by multiple authors under one collective pen name.

Book title or book series	Year released	Collective name/ pen name	Authors' names
Abiding Lilac	2011	Cat Adams	C.T. Adams and Cathy Clamp
Magic's Design	2009	Cat Adams	C.T. Adams and Cathy Clamp
The Blood Singer series	2010–2016	Cat Adams	C.T. Adams and Cathy Clamp
Grundbulten	1974	Kennet Ahl	Lasse Strömstedt and Christer Dahl
Lyftet	1976	Kennet Ahl	Lasse Strömstedt and Christer Dahl
Rävsaxen	1978	Kennet Ahl	Lasse Strömstedt and Christer Dahl
Slutstationen	1980	Kennet Ahl	Lasse Strömstedt and Christer Dahl
Mordvinnaren	1987	Kennet Ahl	Lasse Strömstedt and Christer Dahl
Högriskbegravning	2006	Kennet Ahl	Lasse Strömstedt and Christer Dahl
Kate Daniels series	2007–2018, 2023–	Ilona Andrews	Ilona Gordon and Andrew Gordon
Iron Covenant series	2018–	Ilona Andrews	Ilona Gordon and Andrew Gordon
The Edge series	2018–	Ilona Andrews	Ilona Gordon and Andrew Gordon
The Hidden Legacy series	2014–2022	Ilona Andrews	Ilona Gordon and Andrew Gordon
Naked Came the Stranger	1969	Penelope Ashe	Mike McGrady and 23 other journalists
Fourteen Days	2024	The Author's Guild	Charlie Jane Anders, Margaret Atwood, Joseph Cassara, Jennine Capó Crucet, Angie Cruz, Pat Cummings, Sylvia Day, Emma Donoghue, Dave Eggers, Diana Gabaldon, Tess Gerritsen, John Grisham, Maria Hinojosa, Mira Jacob, Erica Jong, CJ Lyons, Celeste Ng, Tommy Orange, Mary Pope Osborne, Douglas Preston, Alice Randall, Ishmael Reed, Roxana Robinson, Nelly Rosario, James Shapiro, Hampton Sides, R.L. Stine, Nafissa Thompson-Spires, Monique Truong, Scott Turow, Luis Alberto Urrea, Rachel Vail, Weike Wang, Caroline Randall Williams, De’Shawn Charles Winslow, and Meg Wolitzer
Schuß auf die Bühne	1935	Stefan Brockhoff	Dieter Cunz, Richard Plant, Oskar Seidlin
Musik im Totengässlein	1936	Stefan Brockhoff	Dieter Cunz, Richard Plant, Oskar Seidlin
Drei Kioske am See	1937	Stefan Brockhoff	Dieter Cunz, Richard Plant, Oskar Seidlin
Begegnung in Zermatt	1955	Stefan Brockhoff	Dieter Cunz, Richard Plant, Oskar Seidlin
The Painted Sky	2015	Alice Campion	Denise Tart, Jane Richards, Jane St Vincent Welch,Jenny Crocker, and (previously) Madeline Oliver
The Shifting Light	2017	Alice Campion	Denise Tart, Jane Richards, Jane St Vincent Welch,Jenny Crocker, and (previously) Madeline Oliver
From Astrid to Lindgren	2007	Vladimir Oravsky	Kurt Peter Larsen
Magnificent McCoy Men series	1999–2005	Tori Carrington	Tony Karayianni and Lori Schlachter Karayianni
Old Orchard series	2001–2004	Tori Carrington	Tony Karayianni and Lori Schlachter Karayianni
Legal Briefs series	2002–2003	Tori Carrington	Tony Karayianni and Lori Schlachter Karayianni
Kiss and Tell series	2003	Tori Carrington	Tony Karayianni and Lori Schlachter Karayianni
Sleeping with Secrets	2004	Tori Carrington	Tony Karayianni and Lori Schlachter Karayianni
Dangerous Liaisons series	2005–2006	Tori Carrington	Tony Karayianni and Lori Schlachter Karayianni
Sofie Metropolis series	2005–2012	Tori Carrington	Tony Karayianni and Lori Schlachter Karayianni
The Genesis Code	1997	John Case	Jim Hougan and Carolyn Hougan
The First Horseman	1998	John Case	Jim Hougan and Carolyn Hougan
The Syndrome (published as Trance State in the UK)	2001	John Case	Jim Hougan and Carolyn Hougan
The Eighth Day	2002	John Case	Jim Hougan and Carolyn Hougan
The Murder Artist	2004	John Case	Jim Hougan and Carolyn Hougan
Ghost Dancer/The Dance of Death	2006	John Case	Jim Hougan and Carolyn Hougan
Postmark	1988	Samantha Chase	Eileen Buckholtz and Ruth Glick
Needlepoint	1989	Samantha Chase	Eileen Buckholtz and Ruth Glick
Desperate Games series	2001–2013	Jan Coffey	James A. McGoldrick and Nikoo Kafi McGoldrick
Tropical Kiss	2005	Jan Coffey	James A. McGoldrick and Nikoo Kafi McGoldrick
Crash	2006	Jan Coffey	James A. McGoldrick and Nikoo Kafi McGoldrick
Aquarian	2012	Jan Coffey	James A. McGoldrick and Nikoo Kafi McGoldrick
When the Mirror Cracks	2020	Jan Coffey	James A. McGoldrick and Nikoo Kafi McGoldrick
The Expanse series	2011–2021	James S. A. Corey	Daniel Abraham and Ty Franck
Reena Spaulings	2004	Bernadette Corporation	(anonymous)
A House is Built	1929	M. Barnard Eldershaw	Marjorie Barnard and Flora Eldershaw
The Glasshouse	1945	M. Barnard Eldershaw	Marjorie Barnard and Flora Eldershaw
Green Memory	1931	M. Barnard Eldershaw	Marjorie Barnard and Flora Eldershaw
Plaque with Laurel	1937	M. Barnard Eldershaw	Marjorie Barnard and Flora Eldershaw
Tomorrow and Tomorrow and Tomorrow	1947	M. Barnard Eldershaw	Marjorie Barnard and Flora Eldershaw
Star Trek novels #60, #62, #68, #70	1992–1994	L.A. Graf	Julia Ecklar, Karen Rose Cercone, and Melissa Crandall
Caretaker (Star Trek: Voyager novels #1)	1995	L.A. Graf	Julia Ecklar and Karen Rose Cercone
Alien Nation series #7	1995	L.A. Graf	Julia Ecklar and Karen Rose Cercone
Star Trek DS9 novel #16	1996	L.A. Graf	Julia Ecklar and Karen Rose Cercone
Star Trek: Day of Honor #2	1997	L.A. Graf	Julia Ecklar and Karen Rose Cercone
Star Trek: The Captain's Table #1	1998	L.A. Graf	Julia Ecklar and Karen Rose Cercone
Rough Trails (Star Trek: New Earth #3)	2000	L.A. Graf	Julia Ecklar and Karen Rose Cercone
Warriors series	2003–	Erin Hunter	Victoria Holmes, Kate Cary, Cherith Baldry, Clarissa Hutton, Inbali Iserles, Tui T. Sutherland, and Rosie Best
Seekers series	2008–2011, 2012	Erin Hunter	Victoria Holmes, Kate Cary, Cherith Baldry, Clarissa Hutton, Inbali Iserles, Tui T. Sutherland, and Rosie Best
Survivors series	2012–2015, 2015–2019	Erin Hunter	Victoria Holmes, Kate Cary, Cherith Baldry, Clarissa Hutton, Inbali Iserles, Tui T. Sutherland, and Rosie Best
Bamboo Kingdom series	2021–	Erin Hunter	Victoria Holmes, Kate Cary, Cherith Baldry, Clarissa Hutton, Inbali Iserles, Tui T. Sutherland, and Rosie Best
Gunner Cade	1952	Cyril Judd	Cyril M. Kornbluth and Judith Merril
Outpost Mars	1952	Cyril Judd	Cyril M. Kornbluth and Judith Merril
The Deal	2004	Cochrane Lambert	Timothy J. Lambert and Becky Cochrane
Three Fortunes in One Cookie	2005	Cochrane Lambert	Timothy J. Lambert and Becky Cochrane
Lo Zar Non è Morto	1929	I Dieci	Antonio Beltramelli, Massimo Bontempelli, Lucio D'Ambra,Alessandro De Stefani, Filippo Tommaso Marinetti, Fausto Maria Martini, Alessandro Varaldo, Cesare Giulio Viola, Luciano Zuccoli
Mutiny in the Time Machine	1963	Donald Keith	Donald Monroe and Keith Monroe
Time Machine to the Rescue	1967	Donald Keith	Donald Monroe and Keith Monroe
Formation Saga series	2025	Darkly Lem	Josh Eure, Craig Lincoln, Ben Murphy, Cadwell Turnbull, and M. Darusha Wehm
MacPherson Family Saga series	1995–2002	May McGoldrick	James A. McGoldrick and Nikoo Kafi McGoldrick
Highland Treasury Series	2000	May McGoldrick	James A. McGoldrick and Nikoo Kafi McGoldrick
Rebel Promise series	2001–2002	May McGoldrick	James A. McGoldrick and Nikoo Kafi McGoldrick
Scottish dreams series	2003–2004	May McGoldrick	James A. McGoldrick and Nikoo Kafi McGoldrick
The Scottish Relic trilogy	2017	May McGoldrick	James A. McGoldrick and Nikoo Kafi McGoldrick
The Pennington Family series	2017–2018	May McGoldrick	James A. McGoldrick and Nikoo Kafi McGoldrick
Royal Highlander series	2019–2020	May McGoldrick	James A. McGoldrick and Nikoo Kafi McGoldrick
Robotech series	1986–1988	Jack McKinney	James Luceno and Brian Daley
54	2002	Wu Ming	Roberto Bui, Giovanni Cattabriga, Luca Di Meo, Federico Guglielmi, and Riccardo Pedrini
Manituana	2007	Wu Ming	Roberto Bui, Giovanni Cattabriga, Luca Di Meo, Federico Guglielmi, and Riccardo Pedrini
Altai	2009	Wu Ming	Roberto Bui, Giovanni Cattabriga, Luca Di Meo, Federico Guglielmi, and Riccardo Pedrini
The Abyss of Hungry Eyes series	1991–2001	H. L. Oldie	Dmitry Gromov and Oleg Ladyzhensky
Kabir's Cycle series	1994–1998	H. L. Oldie	Dmitry Gromov and Oleg Ladyzhensky
Achaean Cycle series	1995–2011	H. L. Oldie	Dmitry Gromov and Oleg Ladyzhensky
World of Oikoumene series	2006–2015	H. L. Oldie	Dmitry Gromov and Oleg Ladyzhensky
Fantasy World series	2004–2008	H. L. Oldie	Dmitry Gromov and Oleg Ladyzhensky
Hening Cycle series	2001–2003	H. L. Oldie	Dmitry Gromov and Oleg Ladyzhensky
Brain Twister	1962	Mark Phillips	Laurence Mark Janifer and Randall Philip Garrett
The Impossibles	1963	Mark Phillips	Laurence Mark Janifer and Randall Philip Garrett
Supermind	1963	Mark Phillips	Laurence Mark Janifer and Randall Philip Garrett
Ellery Queen series	1929–1971	Ellery Queen	Frederic Dannay and Manfred Bennington Lee
Drury Lane series	1932–1933	Barnaby Ross	Frederic Dannay and Manfred Bennington Lee
The Ways of Starborned series	1997—1998	Alexander Zorich	Yana Botsman and Dmitry Gordevsky
The Vault of Equilibrium series	1998	Alexander Zorich	Yana Botsman and Dmitry Gordevsky
Tomorrow War series	2003–2006	Alexander Zorich	Yana Botsman and Dmitry Gordevsky
Denis Kotik series	2003–2004	Alexander Zorich	Yana Botsman and Dmitry Gordevsky
Charles the Duke series	2001	Alexander Zorich	Yana Botsman and Dmitry Gordevsky
Season of the Weapon	2001	Alexander Zorich	Yana Botsman and Dmitry Gordevsky
Consul of Commonwealth	2002	Alexander Zorich	Yana Botsman and Dmitry Gordevsky
Roman Star	2007	Alexander Zorich	Yana Botsman and Dmitry Gordevsky

== Novels written under multiple authors' names ==
The following books and book series were written by multiple authors under each of their individual names, rather than under a collective pen name.

Book title or books series	Year released	Authors
Here's to Us	2021	Becky Albertalli and Adam Silvera
Lunatics	2012	Dave Barry and Alan Zweibel
Tiny Pretty Things	2015	Sona Charaipotra and Dhonielle Clayton
The Red Scrolls of Magic	2020	Cassandra Clare and Wesley Chu
On a Barbarous Coast	2020	Craig Cormick and Harold Ludwick
Pioneers on Parade	1939	Dymphna Cusack and Miles Franklin
Come In Spinner	1951	Dymphna Cusack and Florence James.
Master of One	2020	Jaida Jones and Dani Bennett
Will Grayson, Will Grayson	2010	John Green and David Levithan
Miss Meteor	2020	Tehlor Kay Mejia and Anna-Marie McLemore
This Is How You Lose the Time War	2019	Amal El-Mohtar and Max Gladstone.
Good Omens	1990	Neil Gaiman and Terry Pratchett
The Lady Janies series	2016–	Cynthia Hand, Brodi Ashton, and Jodi Meadows
The Talisman	1984	Stephen King and Peter Straub
Black House	2001	Stephen King and Peter Straub
The Long Earth series	2012–2016	Terry Pratchett and Stephen Baxter
Pendergast series	1995–	Douglas Preston and Lincoln Child
Gideon series	2011–2018	Douglas Preston and Lincoln Child
Set Fire To The Gods	2020	Sara Raasch and Kristen Simmons
The Color of Dragons	2021	R.A. Salvatore and Erika Lewis
The Illuminatus! series	1975	Robert Shea and Robert Anton Wilson
Dry	2019	Neal Shusterman and Jarrod Shusterman
Dragonlance series	1984–2011, 2022–	Margaret Weis and Tracy Hickman
Sunrise Nights	2024	Jeff Zentner and Brittany Cavallaro
Punching the Air	2020	Ibi Zoboi and Yusef Salaam
The Mote in God's Eye	1974	Jerry Pournelle and Larry Niven
Lucifer's Hammer	1977	Jerry Pournelle and Larry Niven
Footfall	1985	Jerry Pournelle and Larry Niven
