= Alyssa Howard =

Alyssa Howard is a collective pen name used by a group of four authors:

- Eileen Buckholtz (born 1949)
- Ruth Glick (born 1942)
- Carolyn Males (born 1946)
- Louise Titchener (born 1941)
