= Amanda Lee =

Amanda Lee may refer to:

- Amanda Lee (actress) (born 1970), Hong Kong singer and actress
- Amanda Lee (ER), a fictional character in the medical drama ER
- Amanda Lee (pilot) first female Blue Angels demonstration pilot
- Amanda Lee, pseudonym used by Eileen Buckholtz and Ruth Glick
- Amanda Winn-Lee, an American voice actress
- AmaLee (born 1992) known by her YouTube name "LeeandLie", an American singer, YouTube personality and voice actress
- Amanda Lee Rogers
- Amanda Lee Koe
- Amanda Lee Williams

== See also ==
- Amanda Leigh, an album by American artist Mandy Moore
- Amanda Winn-Lee (born 1972), American voice actress, writer and ADR director
- Mandy Lee (disambiguation)
