= Two Weeks =

Two Weeks may refer to:

- Two Weeks (1920 film), a 1920 American comedy drama starring Constance Talmadge
- Two Weeks (2006 film), a 2006 American comedy drama film starring Sally Field
- Two Weeks (TV series), a 2013 South Korean television series
- "Two Weeks" (The Office), TV series episode
- "Two Weeks" (Grizzly Bear song)
- "Two Weeks" (All That Remains song)
- "Two Weeks" (FKA Twigs song)

== See also ==
- Fortnight, a period of two weeks
- 14 Days (disambiguation)
- Fortnight (disambiguation)
