= Clare Richards =

Clare Richards may refer to:

- A pen name of the authors Carolyn Males and Louise Titchener.
- Claire Richards, an English singer-songwriter and dancer.
