= Amelia Shankleton =

Australian missionary (1902–1990)

Amelia Shankleton MBE (4 June 1902 – 15 June 1990) was an Australian missionary who worked with the Aboriginal Inland Mission. She spent much of her career, between 1961 and 1980 working at the Retta Dixon Home in Darwin, Northern Territory.

== Biography ==
Shankleton was born in Marrickville in New South Wales and she was the eldest of five children born to William David and Mary Ellen Shankleton. Her father died when she was ten years old and her mother supported the family as a storekeeper. The family were very involved in their local church and, after leaving school in 1916 she attended the Stott and Underwood Business College where she qualified as a book keeper.

After gaining her qualification Shankleton began working for a bakery company but soon became interested in overseas missions and, by her later teens, she was attending night classes to prepare her for this. She was particularly interested in becoming a missionary in China and, for this reason, began working at markets in Sydney City to become better acquainted with Chinese people and start learning the language.

In 1927, when she was 25 years-old, Shankleton attended a public meeting hosted by the Aboriginal Inland Mission of Australia (AIM), now known as Australian Indigenous Ministries, where she felt the call of God' to work amount Australian Aboriginal peoples. Soon after this, with her mothers support, she was accepted as a probationary missionary for them in March 1927 and, later that year spent a six-moth courses at Erambi Reserve, near Cowra.

After completing this course she spent 5 years at Woorabinda in Queensland, where an Aboriginal Reserve had been established, and there she worked an all aspects of church work; as a part of this she ran groups for men and women and delivered sermons. In 1932 she was transferred to Cherbourg where she remained until 1940. In both of these roles she did not receive a salary of allowance for her work.

In 1940 Shankleton was transferred to Darwin in the Northern Territory after the outbreak of World War II with four other female missionaries; she would also spend a period of time living in Delissaville (now known as Belyuen) where she cared for twenty children, at the decision of the Native Affairs Branch, were not placed in any of the more established missions. For about a year she worked at different mission locations in the region including the Kahlin Compound and the Channel Island Leprosarium and she often crossed Darwin Harbour in a dug out canoe to do so.

In 1941, in the immediate lead up to the Bombing of Darwin, there were calls to evacuate Darwin and Shankleton, alongside another missionary Mary Beasley, was asked to transfer 87 Aboriginal women and children to Balaklava in South Australia. They left Darwin with a military escort and travelled by train, bus and truck to Alice Springs where they picked up more evacuees. They would remain in Balaklava, under Shankleton's care, until May 1946.

On the groups return to Darwin many of the women and children returned to their home communities and families and approximately 30 of them remained in Shankleton's care. They initially lived in ex-Army hospital buildings in Berrimah until the establishment of the Retta Dixon Home, which Shankleton named to honour Retta Long, on 17 December 1947 where Shankleton was the superintendent. by March 1949 there were 67 children living there. A 1950 report on the home stated that the average number of children living there was 70 and that about 8 women, at any one time, were receiving pre-natal care there.

Shankleton served in this role until 1 June 1962 when she retired at the age of 60; she stayed on as the homes book keeper until June 1967 and continued to live at the home until it was officially closed in 1980. Shankleton was evacuated for a six month period due to Cyclone Tracy between 1974 and 1975.

Many claims of abuse have been levelled at the Retta Dixon Home while under the leadership of Shankleton and many believe that she did not act when told about wrongdoings by other staff employed there. She also discouraged any children under her care attending leisure activities in Darwin and did not allow them to go to the local picture theatre or any of the dance halls without supervision; Harry Giese, the then Director of Welfare in the Northern Territory Administration, deemed her attitude "very limited" and a bad decision for the children.

After leaving the Retta Dixon Home Shankleton moved to Batchelor, some distance from Darwin, until deciding to leave the Northern Territory in 1984 to live with her sister in Sydney.

She died on 15 June 1990 at the age of 88. After her death, a group calling themselves "the boys and girls of Retta Dixon Home" placed an ad in The Sunday Territorian: "You never forgot our birthday or a Christmas gift, but the greatest gift of all was the love you gave to each of us."

== Awards and honours ==
Shankleton was awarded a Member of the Order of the British Empire in June 1964 for her services to the Northern Territory.
