= The Genesis Code (disambiguation) =

The Genesis Code is a 2010 film.

The Genesis Code or Genesis Code may refer to:

- The Genesis Code, a 1981 book by William Lee Stokes
- The Genesis Code, a 1997 novel by John Case
- Genesis Code, a 2014 novel by Jamie Metzl
