= Amanda Williams =

Amanda Williams may refer to:

- Amanda Williams (judge) (born 1946)
- Amanda Williams (artist) (born 1974)
- Amanda Williams (cricketer) (born 1988)
- Amanda Kyle Williams (1957–2018), American crime writer
