= Margaret Price (disambiguation) =

Margaret Price or Maggie Price may refer to:

== People ==
- Margaret Price (1941–2011), Welsh operatic soprano
- Margaret Evans Price (1888–1973), co-founder of Fisher-Price Toys
- Maggie Price (writer), co-author of Crimes of Passion (2002) with B. J. Daniels
- Margaret Price (scholar), disability studies scholar

== Other ==
- Margaret Price, a character in the 1938 U.S. film Air Devils
- Maggie Price, a character in the TV horror series Monsters
