= Barbara Cummings =

Aboriginal Australian activist (1948–2019)

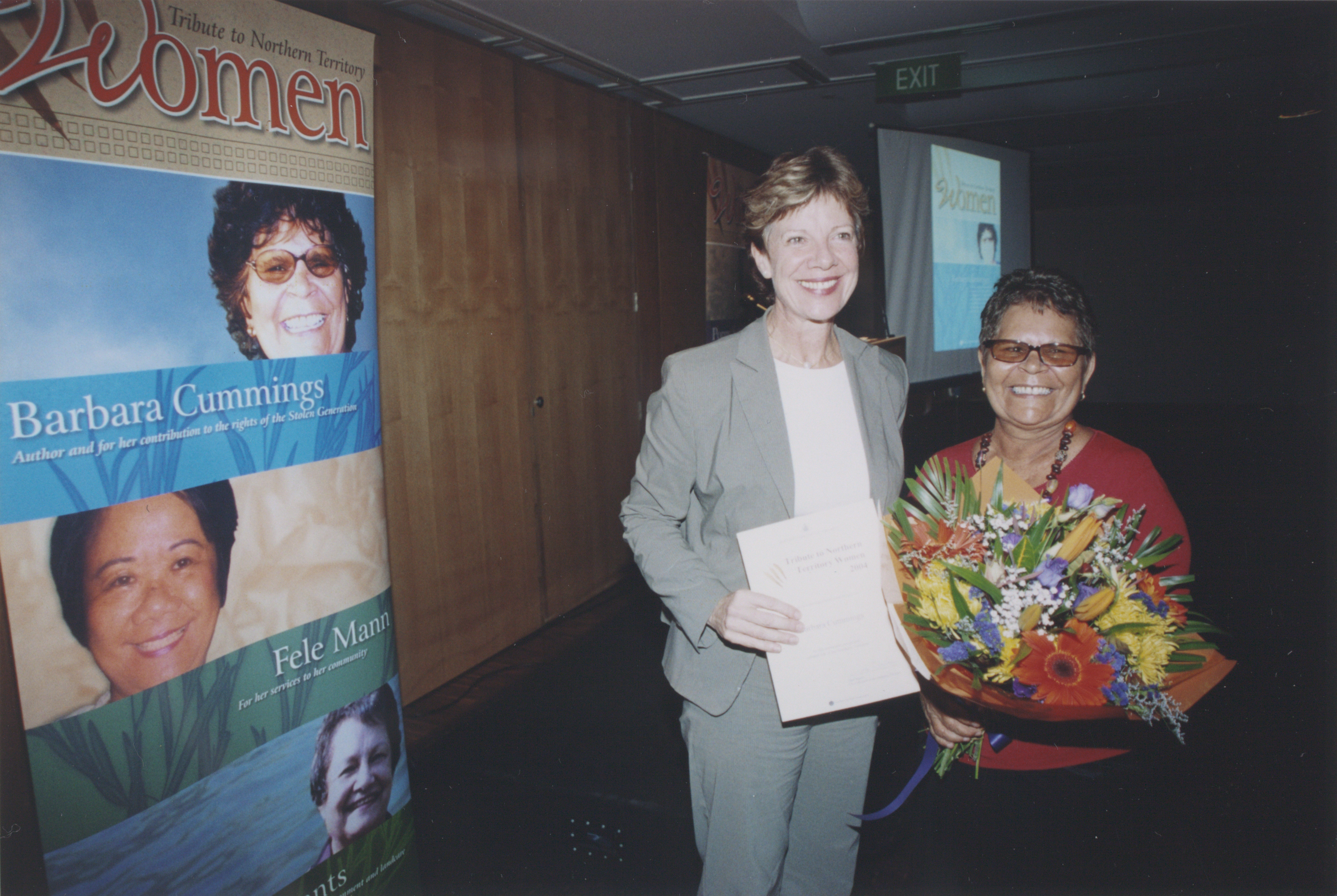
Clare Martin presents certificate to Barbara Cummings as a part of the Tribute to Northern Territory Women, 2003

Barbara Cummings (1 January 1948 – 1 September 2019) was an Australian Nangiomeri woman and member of the Stolen Generations. She was brought up at the Retta Dixon Home in Darwin, Northern Territory.

She became an activist, social worker, writer and advocate for members of the Stolen Generations and contributed to the development of the Bringing Them Home report which became the basis of the Australian Government's 2007 Apology to Australia's Indigenous peoples.

== Life in the Northern Territory ==
Cummings was born at the Bagot Aboriginal Reserve in Darwin, which had previously been the site of the Kahlin Compound. Her mother, Nellie, had been taken from her family in the Daly River and placed there some years before. In 1948 Cummings also was taken from her mother and placed at the Retta Dixon Home, alongside her two brothers.

In 1990 Cummings published her autobiography Take This Child (1990) which was an account at her time at the Retta Dixon home and the harsh treatment, which included abuse and emotional deprivation, that the children received there. She recalled been beaten regularly during her time there and said of some of these beatings:

I was a child of 10 or 11 and you don't beat a child with a cane that severe, or humiliate the child, to the severity where he or she crumbles

— Barbara Cummings, Institutional sexual, physical abuse compensation case to enter Commonwealth mediation, ABC News, 22 November 2016

This book told not only her story but the stories of the people around her and included numerous interviews with others in which she sought their account of what had happened and see if she had missed anything. This book was used to inform the 1997 Bringing The Home Report which was published by the Australian Human Rights Commission.

In her later life Cummings also worked to support victims who were testifying at the Royal Commission into Institutional Responses to Child Sexual Abuse and, from 2015, former Retta Dixon inmates makings applications for compensation through the National Redress Scheme.

In 2019, a few months before her death, she was awarded with an honorary doctorate from Batchelor Institute of Indigenous Tertiary Education, alongside Rosalie Kunoth-Monks. for her contributions to the advancement of First Nations peoples. These were the first honorary doctorate awards conferred by the institute.

== Legacy ==
Cummings legacy is significant and, following her death, a condolence motion was passed in the Northern Territory Legislative Assembly in which the then Chief Minister Michael Gunner stated:

There are those who still dismiss the Stolen Generation. I do not think there are many in this Chamber who do, and especially not in the gallery, yet it remains incumbent upon us to challenge that view whenever we hear it. Barb did that with her dignity and with her voice. We all know those times when you meet a special person and you are left with a feeling you have just spent time with someone who is very genuine, who sometimes leaves you a little floored. As soon as you sat down with Barb, time kind of stood still. All her words had weight. She had a way of putting you in the moment

— Michael Gunner, Condolence Motion: Dr Barbara Cummings, NT Legislative Assembly, 26 November 2019

In the same motion the then Minister for Aboriginal Affairs, Selena Uibo, called her 'a trailblazer for Aboriginal affairs in Australia and a powerful voice for our Stolen Generations'.

Her death also discussed in the Australian House of Representatives where Warren Snowdon called her 'a leader in every sense'.

== Publications ==
Cummings, Barbara (1990). Take this child - : from Kahlin Compound to the Retta Dixon Children's Home. Aboriginal Studies Press, Canberra.

The title of this book is taken from a quote by Retta Dixon, for whom the Retta Dixon Home was named, in which she said that God had told her to "[t]ake these children, and train them for Me". Cummings also said that this quote reflected the attitudes of successive governments and policy-makers.
