= 14 Days =

14 Days may refer to:

- 14 Days (EP), by Arkitekt, 2009
- 14 Days (film), a 2014 US sci-fi film
- 14 Days: Girlfriend Intlo, a 2025 Indian Telugu-language film
- Fourteen Days, 2024 collaborative novel

== Also ==
- Fourteen Days in May, 1987 British documentary film
- 14 Days to Life, 1997 German thriller film

== See also ==
- Fortnight (disambiguation)
- Two weeks (disambiguation)
