= My Time Among the Whites =

2019 essay collection by Jennine Crucet

My Time Among the Whites: Notes from an Unfinished Education
- First edition
- Author: Jennine Capó Crucet
- Language: English
- Publisher: Picador
- Publication date: 2019
- ISBN: 978-1-250-29943-7

My Time Among the Whites: Notes from an Unfinished Education is a 2019 collection of essays written by Jennine Capó Crucet.

== Critical reception ==
PopMatters wrote "Crucet's prose is conversational and largely free of flourish, imagery, or metaphor (with, however, a strong penchant for parentheticals). Her structures are looping and elliptical, seeming to go in different directions, until she pulls them together at the end, when you realize that the sentences don't need symbols, because the whole essay has been symbolic."
