= Soledad (novel) =

2001 novel by Angie Cruz

- Author: Angie Cruz
- Genre: Fiction
- Published: 2001
- Publisher: Simon and Schuster
- ISBN: 0743217462

Soledad is the debut novel by Angie Cruz, published in 2001 by Simon & Schuster.

== Introduction ==
Soledad follows the story of a girl, Soledad, who cannot get away from her contentious family fast enough. Once Soledad leaves, she enrols in an art course at Cooper Union. However, sometime later, Soledad returns to Washington Heights after her mother, Olivia, becomes ill. Evidently, Olivia is in a state where she is considered a “living ghost.” It appears that she is in an emotional coma and the return of Soledad is regarded as the only cure. After returning, Soledad tries to tame her cousin Flaca’s unruly behavior and resist falling for a neighborhood boy, Ritche. Soledad is also confronted with trying to salvage her relationship with her mother and uncover the secrets behind the death of her father.

A significant portion of the novel is told from the perspective of three of Soledad’s female relatives, Flaca and Gorda. Flaca is constantly in rivalry with Soledad. Gorda is Soledad's aunt, also known as a witch (bruja), who treats her sister’s ailments with ceremonies and home remedies. Olivia's point of view is provided through flashbacks and italicized dream narration. When Cruz outlines fresh details of rhythms and behavior of Dominican community life, the three are rarely left out. Soledad is an important literary piece which presents a story of chaos and culture, integrity with family and mysticism while examining the concepts from the perspective of a Latina.
