= Fourteen Days =

Collaborative novel

- Author: Charlie Jane Anders, Margaret Atwood, Jennine Capó Crucet, Joseph Cassara, Angie Cruz, Pat Cummings (illustrator), Sylvia Day, Emma Donoghue, Dave Eggers, Diana Gabaldon, Tess Gerritsen, John Grisham, Maria Hinojosa, Mira Jacob, Erica Jong, C. J. Lyons, Celeste Ng, Tommy Orange, Mary Pope Osborne, Douglas Preston, Alice Randall, Caroline Randall Williams, Ishmael Reed, Roxana Robinson, Nelly Rosario, James S. Shapiro, Hampton Sides, R. L. Stine, Nafissa Thompson-Spires, Monique Truong, Scott Turow, Luis Alberto Urrea, Rachel Vail, Weike Wang, De’Shawn Charles Winslow, and Meg Wolitze
- Language: English
- Publication date: February 6, 2024
- Pages: 384
- ISBN: 978-1-784-74545-5

Fourteen Days is a novel collaboratively written by 36 authors and edited by Margaret Atwood and Douglas Preston. The book is set in a Lower East Side tenement and consists of fourteen chapters taking place in fourteen days, beginning on March 31, 2020. Published by HarperCollins on February 6, 2024, the book is a project by the Authors Guild and is written as a frame story narrated by the tenement's superintendent.
