= Dominicana (novel) =

2019 novel by Angie Cruz

- Author: Angie Cruz
- Publisher: Flatiron Books
- Publication date: September 3, 2019
- ISBN: 978-1-250-20593-3

Dominicana is a 2019 novel by Angie Cruz. It is Cruz's third novel, and was shortlisted for the 2020 Women's Prize for Fiction.

== Plot ==
The book tells the story of Ana, a young woman from the Dominican Republic who moves to New York in 1965 after marrying an older man, Juan. She is unhappy there, but sees a new side of life when her husband temporarily returns to the Dominican Republic leaving her in the care of his younger brother, Cesar: she can study English, go to the beach, and go dancing. When Juan returns, she has a decision to make.

== Reception ==
Publishers Weekly described the work as "Enthralling...Cruz's winning novel will linger in the reader’s mind long after the close of the story." NBC described Dominicana as "one of the most evocative and empowering immigrant stories of our time." The Observer's reviewer described it as "a grim portrait of what it means to be doubly disenfranchised as a female illegal immigrant in an oppressively patriarchal community", and says that Cruz "was inspired to write it by her mother’s experience" Kirkus Reviews called the novel "a moving, sad, and sometimes disarmingly funny take on migration and the forces that propel us into the world."

Dominicana won a 2020 Alex Award (as one of ten adult books likely to appeal to readers aged 12-18) and was shortlisted for the 2020 Women's Prize for Fiction, which was won by Maggie O'Farrell's Hamnet. It was selected as the inaugural pick for Good Morning America's book club, and viewers were offered a recipe for "Ana's pastelito love bites".
