= Emma Callaghan =

Aboriginal nurse and midwife, (1884–1979)

Emma Jane Callaghan (28 February 1884 - 31 December 1979) was an Australian Aboriginal midwife, Indigenous rights/ activist supporter, nurse and Indigenous Culture Recorder.

== Early life ==
Emma Foot was born a younger twin to Kathleen Sims of the Tharawal people and Willam Foot in La Perouse, New South Wales. At age thirteen although barely educated herself, Callaghan became a teacher within an Aboriginal settlement in Bellbrook, New South Wales.

== Teaching and caring career ==
Emma lived on this settlement for twenty-five years alongside Retta Long helping with childbirth, birth registration, and the ill.

She was proficient in needlework and was also a translator of the Dhanggati language, the tongue of her first husband, Athol Callaghan's tribe, working with biblical tales. Her new home in Armidale was later visited by Ellen Kent Hughes. In the same year as her second husband, Henry James Cook's death, she met Princess Marina of Greece and Denmark. She died in Randwick, New South Wales, aged 95.

== Commemoration ==
In 1985 Callaghan's home was preserved by the State government.

In November 2023 it was announced that Callaghan was one of eight women chosen to be commemorated in the second round of blue plaques sponsored by the Government of New South Wales alongside, among others, Kathleen Butler, godmother of Sydney Harbour Bridge; Susan Katherina Schardt; Dorothy Drain, one of Australia's first female war correspondents; writer Charmian Clift; Pearl Mary Gibbs, an Aboriginal rights movement activist; and charity worker Grace Emily Munro.
