= Mandy Lee =

Mandy Lee may refer to:

- Mandy Lee (singer), lead singer of American band MisterWives
- "Mandy Lee", 1899 song by American singer Arthur Collins
- "Mandy Lee/Bottle Up and Go", 1969 song by British singer Kevin Coyne

== See also ==
- Amanda Lee (disambiguation)
