= Joanna Wayne =

American novelist

Jo Ann Vest
- Born: Jo Ann Gibbs Vest; March 9, 1941; Shreveport, Louisiana, U.S.
- Died: March 25, 2024 (aged 83); Montgomery, TX
- Occupation: Novelist
- Writing career
- Pen name: Joanna Wayne
- Period: 1994-2023
- Genre: Romance
- Notable awards: Romantic Times Reviewers’ Choice Award, Romance Writer’s of America (RWA) Ruby Award, North Louisiana Romance Writers Climbing Rose Award, Romantic Times Career Achievement Award nomination

Jo Ann Vest is an American author of contemporary romance novels under the pseudonym Joanna Wayne.

== Biography ==
Wayne was born and raised in Shreveport, Louisiana. She began reading when she was four years old, and quickly began making weekly trips to the library to find books to read. In 1984, she married and moved to New Orleans, where she enrolled in a writing course and joined a professional writing organization.

Her books have appeared on the Waldenbooks Bestselling List for romance. She has been nominated four times for a Romantic Times Reviewers' Choice Award, winning twice with Surprise Package and Attempted Matrimony. Romantic Times has also nominated her for a Career Achievement Award.

Joanna Wayne passed away in March of 2024. She lived the last 20 years of her life in Montgomery, TX, just north of Houston, Texas.

== Bibliography ==
- Deep in the Bayou (1994)
- Behind the Mask (1995)
- Extreme Heat (1996)
- Family Ties (1997)
- All I Want for Christmas (1998)
- Jodie's Little Secrets (1998)
- Lone Star Lawman (1999)
- Memories at Midnight (1999)
- The Second Son (2000)
- The Stranger Next Door (2000)
- A Mother's Secrets (2000)
- The Outsider's Redemption (2000)
- Another Woman's Baby (2001)
- Unconditional Surrender (2001)
- Mystic Isle (2002)
- Behind the Veil (2002)
- Surprise Package (2002)
- What Lies Beneath (Feature anthology with Anne Stuart and Caroline Burnes) (2002)
- Just One Look (2003)
- Attempted Matrimony (2003)
- Under Wraps (2003) (with Susan Kearney)
- Alligator Moon (2004)
- As Darkness Fell (2012)
- Escape the Night (2004)
- Just Before Dawn (2004)
- A Father's Duty (2004)
- The Amulet (2012)
- Justice for All (2005)
- Security Measures (2005)
- The Gentleman's Club (2005)
- A Clandestine Affair (2006)
- Maverick Christmas (2006)
- 24 Karat Ammunition (Four Brothers of Colts Run Cross Book 1) (2007)
- Texas Gun Smoke (Four Brothers of Colts Run Cross Book 2) (2007)
- Point Blank Protector (Four Brothers of Colts Run Cross Book 3) (2008)
- Loaded (Four Brothers of Colts Run Cross Book 4) (2008)
- Miracle at Colts Run Cross (Four Brothers of Colts Run Cross Book 5) (2008)
- Cowboy Commando (Special Ops Texas Book 1) (2009)
- Cowboy to the Core (Special Ops Texas Book 2) (2009)
- Bravo, Tango, Cowboy (Special Ops Texas Book 3) (2009)
- Cowboy Delirium (2010)
- Cowboy Swagger (Sons of Troy Ledger Book 1) (2010)
- Genuine Cowboy (Sons of Troy Ledger Book 2) (2011)
- AK-Cowboy (Sons of Troy Ledger Book 3) (2011)
- Cowboy Fever (Sons of Troy Ledger Book 4) (2011)
- Stranger, Seducer, Protector (2011)
- Maverick Christmas (2011)
- A Clandestine Affair (2011)
- 24/7 Bodyguard (2011)
- Cowboy Conspiracy (Sons of Troy Ledger Book 5) (2012)
- Attempted Matrimony (2012)
- Just Before Dawn (2012)
- A Father's Duty (2012)
- Son of a Gun (Big D Dads Book 1) (2012)
- Live Ammo (Big D Dads Book 2) (2012)
- Big Shot (Big D Dads Book 3) (2012)
- Trumped Up Charges (The Daltons Book 1) (2013)
- Another Woman's Baby (2014)
- The Stranger Next Door (2014)
- Unrepentant Cowboy (The Daltons Book 2) (2014)
- Hard Ride to Dry Gulch (The Daltons Book 3) (2014)
- The Second Son (2014)
- Midnight Rider (The Daltons Book 4) (2015)
- Showdown at Shadow Junction (The Daltons Book 7) (2015)
- Ambush at Dry Gulch (The Daltons Book 8) (2016)
- Riding Shotgun (The Kavanaughs Book 1) (2017)
- Quickdraw Cowboy (The Kavanaughs Book 2) (2017)
- Fearless Gunfighter (The Kavanaughs) (2017)
- Dropping the Hammer (The Kavanaughs Book 1775) (2018)
- New Orleans Noir (2019)
- French Quarter Fatale (2023)

=== Omnibus ===
- Bayou Blood Brothers (2001) (with Metsy Hingle and Rebecca York)
- What Lies Beneath: The Road to Hidden Harbor / Remember Me / Primal Fear (2002) (with Caroline Burnes, Anne Stuart)
- When Duty Calls: Lone Star Lawman/Hotshot P.I. (2003) (with B J Daniels)
- Private Scandals: Shadows of the Past / Family Unveiled / Sleeping with Secrets (2004) (w/ Tori Carrington, Judy Christenberry)
- Heatwave (2004) (with Kay David and Bobby Hutchinson)
