= Retta Dixon Home =

Former institution for Aboriginal Australian children

Coordinates: 12°24′55″S 130°51′21″E

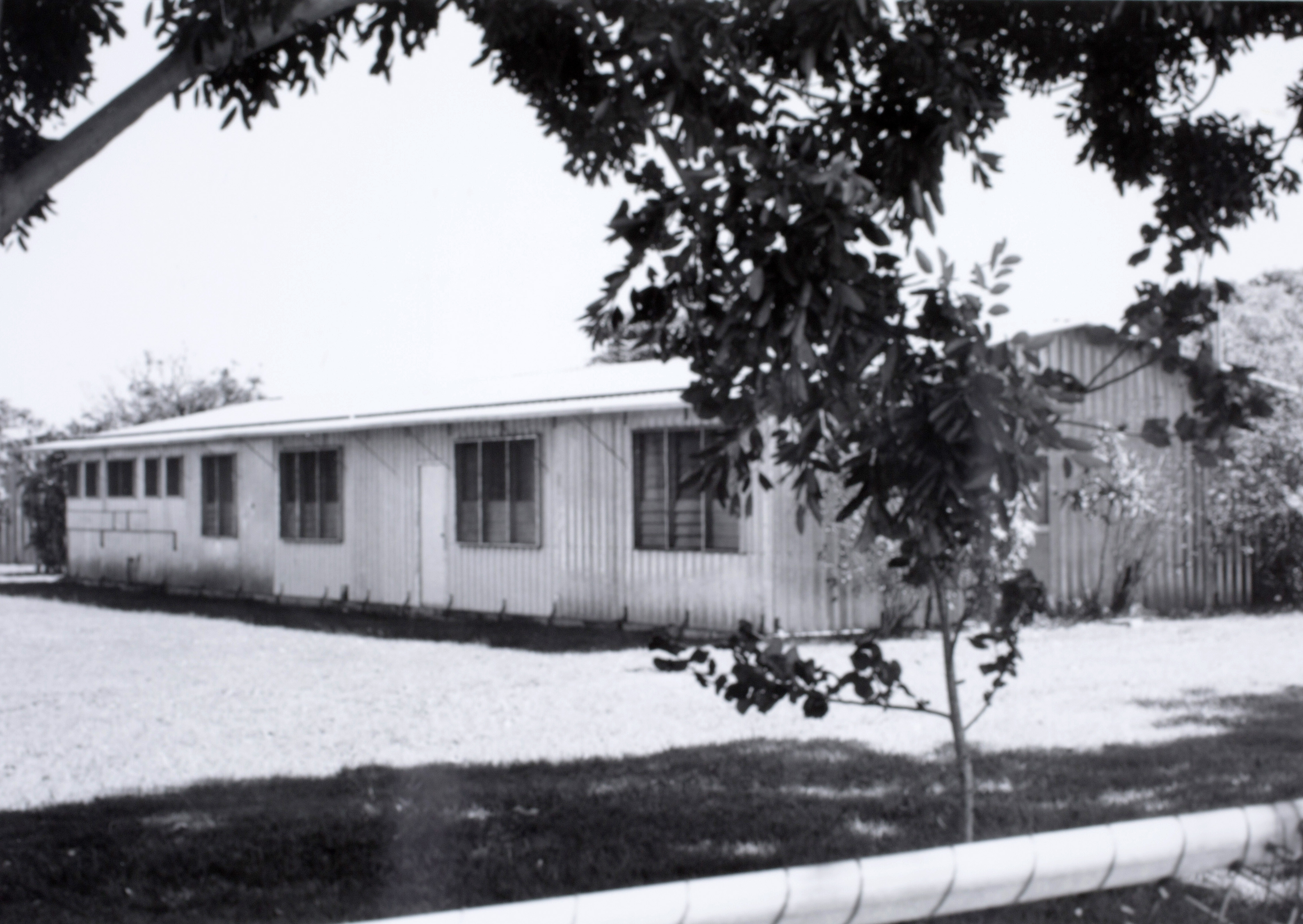
Retta Dixon Home

The Retta Dixon Home was an institution for Aboriginal children in Darwin, Northern Territory, Australia, which operated from 1946 until 1982. Named after missionary Retta Dixon, the home was located on the Bagot Aboriginal Reserve, and run by Aborigines Inland Mission of Australia. In 2015 it came to light at the Royal Commission into Institutional Responses to Child Sexual Abuse that many children there had suffered physical, mental, and sexual abuse, and two years later, compensation was paid to 71 women who brought a class action against the federal government.

== History ==
The Retta Dixon Home was established in 1946 by the Aborigines Inland Mission of Australia (AIM), now renamed Australian Indigenous Ministries.

Retta Dixon was a woman who in 1896 took over the Petersham Christian Endeavour Society at La Perouse, near Botany Bay in New South Wales, before moving to the Singleton area in the Hunter Valley in 1905, where the Aborigines Inland Mission of Australia was formed. She married Leonard Long and around 1909, AIM set up a centre at Herberton in Far North Queensland.

AIM began working in the Top End in the 1930s. In 1941 an AIM representative was invited to Bagot Aboriginal Reserve to take charge of "part-coloured" or "half-caste" Aboriginal women and children. With the outbreak of World War II the then superintendent, Amelia Shankleton (1902–1990), evacuated 72 children to Balaklava in South Australia in 1942. Upon returning to Darwin in 1946, the AIM set up the Retta Dixon Home as an institution to care for these children and their mothers, and was run in conjunction with a hostel for young Aboriginal women, with some funding provided by the Australian Government. The home was located in the centre of the Bagot reserve, between the hospital and the settlement, with a fence separating the home from the rest of the settlement. The federal government's Native Affairs Branch supplied all of the food, while AIM provided clothing for the children, unless their mothers were working and could afford to pay.

The Administrator of the Northern Territory wrote in a letter:

At present it is semi-official in operation in that supplies and a number of services are provided by the Native affairs Branch whilst the Aboriginal Inland Mission workers perform their duties in an honorary capacity. The number of wards has increased considerably in the last year because of the removal of half-caste children from Aboriginal camps in rural areas and the acceptance by half-castes in Darwin of the facilities provided. There is a pressing need for such an organisation in Darwin and Miss Shankelton, with her staff, has proved her ability to deal with the problem.

By March 1949 the number of children at the home had increased to 67. A 1950 review reported that there were an average number of 70 children in the home over a year, and around eight women received pre- and post-natal care. School-age children (5 to 16) were taken to the Darwin Public School by "Administration transport", and after leaving school were expected to do vocational training, staying at the home until they were 18. Some children were sent interstate to complete their schooling under the "Part-Aboriginal Education Scheme". They also received religious instruction, and were obliged to attend worship, but not allowed to participate in traditional Aboriginal ceremonies, songs, or dances. It was later reported that girls were taken from their parents, trained to be domestic servants for white families as far away as Victoria, and some girls were physically, mentally, and sexually abused at the home.

From July 1952, the government continued to pay a subsidy for each resident, but AIM had to start paying for provisions From 1954 to 1957, provided some funding for major purchases, including a Bedford truck and later a VW Combi van, and various infrastructure items.

A 1953 government inquiry criticised conditions at the home, and described the missionaries as "fanatical" and poorly trained. In response to hearing that the older children were not allowed to attend the cinema or and social events in Darwin unsupervised, in 1955 Director of Welfare Harry Giese asserted that, as wards of the state, the government should have a say in what they were permitted to do. He recommended that children from the home should be able to become members of the Scouts and Girl Guides, as well as police clubs for boys and girls. As a result of the inquiry's report, Retta Dixon Home was rebuilt in 1961-1962 into cottage-style accommodation. Eight independently-run six-bedroom cottage homes were situated at the northern end of Bagot Reserve, around 2 km (1.2 mi) from the original location. Each cottage was intended to be supervised by a married couple, but in reality mainly by single women took the positions, and all were run under the general jurisdiction of the male superintendent.

Shankelton, who was described by former resident as "kind", continued as superintendent at the Retta Dixon Home and received an MBE in 1964.

The Retta Dixon Home was badly damaged by Cyclone Tracy in 1974, with five cottages out of eight destroyed. Around 50 children were sent interstate temporarily.

In the late 1970s the government decided to close the Retta Dixon Home, and an official closure date set for 30 June 1980. However, it continued to operate under private arrangements until 1982.

== Today ==
There is now a park called Karu Park where the home once stood, marked by a memorial plaque that reads:

This plaque is in recognition of Aboriginal children displaced from mother and country. Karu Park accommodated a children's institution named Retta Dixon Home. Similar institutions were established at Kahlin, Garden Point, Croker Island and Groote Eylandt. This plaque is dedicated to the memory of those children and their mission workers.

There is also a plaque in honour of the work of missionaries Retta Dixon and Amelia Shankleton.

== Abuse and compensation ==
Among the children taken into care was Lorna Nelson, later Cubillo, the daughter of Maisie Napanangka and the white soldier Horace Nelson, who unsuccessfully sued the Australian Federal Government, not AIM, for compensation in 2000. The full court of the Federal Court dismissed an appeal in 2001, and leave to appeal to the High Court was denied in 2002.

Allegations of child sexual abuse at the Retta Dixon Home were investigated at the Royal Commission into Institutional Responses to Child Sexual Abuse in 2015. Ten former residents gave evidence, describing their experiences of rape, molestation, and abuse at the home. Former resident Sue Roman shared the stories of 50 other survivors of abuse, and her friend Sandra Kitching also testified. Since then, Roman, working with the last surviving speakers of the Larrakia language, created the first Larrakia language dictionary. She has also worked on truth-telling inquiries, fought a land claim, and represented Australia at international conferences. In honour of her grandmother, Yirra Bandoo, who had her children stolen from her, Roman founded an Aboriginal corporation with that name.

The findings, released on 19 August 2015, found that AIM "did not meet the obligations that it had to children in its care, including protection from sexual abuse". The Commissioners found that AIM did not provide sufficient training to its staff on how to detect or respond to allegations of child sexual abuse. As a result of an out-of-court settlement, 71 people who brought a class action were awarded compensation in 2017.

As of September 2021, a least ten people had applied for compensation under the Australian Government's National Redress Scheme (NRS), which was set up for people who have experienced institutional child abuse. However the government prevented AIM from being a participant in the NRS, for the stated reason that the group could not afford to pay out potential claimants. There was a possibility that funding could be drawn from a government body, as a "funder of last resort", during the 2021 review of the scheme. Claimants and the AIM were exploring ways in which AIM could make a meaningful apology to survivors of abuse suffered at the home.

In September 2021, a civil lawsuit brought by a man in his 50s against AIM and the Commonwealth in 2020 for abuse suffered by him at the home was concluded, with compensation paid after agreement was reached in a court-ordered mediation process.
