= Samantha Chase =

Pseudonymous author

Samantha Chase was a pseudonym used by Eileen Buckholtz and Ruth Glick.

The books they wrote under this pseudonym were:

- Postmark (1988) ISBN 9780944276112
- Needlepoint (1989) ISBN 9780944276587

Samantha Chase also wrote the Shaughnessy Brothers series of novels.
