= Fortnight (disambiguation) =

A fortnight is a time period lasting 14 days or half of a month.

Fortnight may also refer to:

- Fortnight (magazine), Irish magazine published from 1970 to 2012
- "Fortnight" (song), by Taylor Swift and Post Malone, 2024
- "Fortnight", song by Polo G from his 2021 album Hall of Fame 2.0

== See also ==
- Fortnite, 2017 video game
- Fort Nightly, 2007 album by White Rabbits
- The Fortnightly Review, English magazine published from 1865 to 1954
- 14 Days (disambiguation)
- Two weeks (disambiguation)
