= B. J. Daniels (writer) =

American novelist

Barbara Johnson Heinlein (pen name B. J. Daniels) is an American author of contemporary romance novels, primarily in the subgenre of romantic suspense. She has won a Romantic Times Career Achievement Award and a Romantic Times Reviewers' Choice Award.

== Biography ==
Daniels was born in Texas but spent much of her life living in Montana. She decided that she wanted to be a writer when she turned eight years old. At age thirty she changed jobs to work at a newspaper as a feature's writer and editor. In her spare time, she wrote short stories, and in 1987 she sold a short story to Woman's World. She sold them 35 more short stories before writing her first novel. This book, Odd Man Out, was sold to the Harlequin Intrigue line of contemporary romantic suspense category romance novels. It was nominated for Best First Book and Best Intrigue for 1995 in the Romantic Times Reviewers' Choice Awards.

Four of Daniels' books have been nominated for Romantic Times Reviewers' Choice Awards, with her novel Premeditated Marriage winning in 2002, which the magazine described as "a suspenseful tale, blended artfully with a romance". Romantic Times also awarded her a Career Achievement Award for Series Romantic Suspense in 2002. Daniels' is a "USA Today Best Seller."

Daniels' currently resides in Montana where she lives with her husband and their two dogs. She enjoys snowboarding, camping, boating and playing tennis.

== Bibliography ==
=== Evil in Timber Falls series ===
- Mountain Sheriff (2003)
- Day of Reckoning (2004)
- Wanted Woman (2004)

=== McCalls' Montana series ===
- Cowboy Accomplice (2004)
- The Cowgirl in Question (2004)
- Ambushed! (2005)
- High-Caliber Cowboy (2005)
- Shotgun Surrender (2005)

=== Whitehorse, Montana series ===
- Classified Christmas (2007)
- The Mystery Man Of Whitehorse (2007)
- The New Deputy In Town (2007)
- Secret Of Deadman's Coulee (2007)

=== The Montana Hamiltons series ===
- Wild Horses (2015)
- Lone Rider (2015)
- Lucky Shot (2015)

=== Novels ===
- Outlawed! (1995)
- Odd Man Out (1995)
- Hotshot P.I. (1997)
- Undercover Christmas (1997)
- A Father for Her Baby (1998)
- Stolen Moments (1999)
- The Agent's Secret Child (2000)
- Love at First Sight (2000)
- Intimate Secrets (2000)
- A Woman with a Mystery (2001)
- Mystery Bride (2001)
- Premeditated Marriage (2002)
- Howling in the Darkness (2002)
- Rodeo Daddy (2002)
- Secret Bodyguard (2003)
- The Masked Man (2003)
- Know (2004)
- When Twilight Comes (2005)
- Crossfire (2005)
- Crime Scene at Cardwell Ranch (2006)
- Keeping Christmas (2006)
- Secret Weapon Spouse (2006)
- Undeniable Proof (2006)
- Big Sky Standoff (2007)
- Shadow Lake (2007)
- Matchmaking With A Mission (2008)

=== Omnibus ===
- Crimes of Passion (2002) (with Jonathan Harrington, Maggie Price and Nancy Means Wright)
- Veils of Deceit (2003) (with Jasmine Cresswell)
- When Duty Calls: Lone Star Lawman/Hotshot P.I. (2003) (with Joanna Wayne)
- Guarded Secrets (2003) (with Rebecca York)
- Snow Angels (2004) (with Brenda Novak)
- Day of Reckoning / Borrowed Identity (2004) (with Kasi Blake)
- The Romance Collection (2004) (with Marilyn Pappano and Anne Marie Winston)
