= Jim Hougan =

American novelist

- Born: James Richard Edwards; October 14, 1942 (age 83); New York City, U.S.
- Education: William Horlick High School; University of Wisconsin–Madison (BS)
- Occupations: Author, journalist, film producer
- Spouse: Carolyn (1966–2007; her death)
- Writing career
- Pen name: John Case (with Carolyn Hougan)
- Genres: fiction, non-fiction
- Notable works: Spooks (1978); Secret Agenda (1984)

James Richard Hougan (born George James Edwards on October 14, 1942) is an American author, investigative reporter and documentary film producer.

A best-selling novelist in the United States and Europe, he is also known for Secret Agenda, a book on the Watergate scandal.

== Early life and education ==
Hougan was born in Brooklyn, New York, and graduated from William Horlick High School in Racine, Wisconsin, in 1960. In 1966, he earned a Bachelor of Science degree in philosophy from the University of Wisconsin-Madison.

== Career ==
Hougan wed Carolyn Johnson and began work as a newspaper reporter and photographer for the Prince George's County Sentinel in the Washington metropolitan area. Afterward he joined the Capitol Times newspaper in Madison, Wisconsin. In 1971, while working there and as a stringer for The New York Times, he was awarded a study grant from the Alicia Patterson Foundation and was a Rockefeller Foundation fellow. Reporting from Mexico City, Amsterdam, Ibiza, Athens, and London, his articles for the two foundations about "contemporary Western youth movements" were published in national newspapers and magazines. During this time, while covering countercultural movements in the West, he reported as well on the massacre of student dissidents in Tlatelolco, Mexico City and on the violent repression of their Greek counterparts by the Greek military junta in Athens. Both assignments were considered dangerous.

Hougan's first book, Decadence, was published soon after his return from Europe. His second book, Spooks, reported on the "metastasis" of the American intelligence community and the emerging "cryptocracy." In its review, the Los Angeles Times declared Spooks "one of the best non-fiction books of the year, a monument of fourth-level research and fact-searching." Howard Hughes, Robert Maheu, Robert Vesco, Aristotle Onassis, and Yoshio Kodama were among the book's more infamous subjects, but its most important contribution to the investigative canon may have been its reportage about lesser known intelligence agents such as Bernard Spindel, Lou Russell, Mitch WerBell, John Frank, Joseph Shimon and others.

Hougan testified at the trial of Mark Knops, editor of the Madison Kaleidoscope, a newspaper in Madison, Wisconsin.

As Washington Editor of Harper's Magazine (1979–84), Hougan wrote extensively about the U.S. intelligence community, and the CIA in particular. His investigation of the Watergate break-in uncovered links between the Democratic National Committee (DNC) headquarters in the Watergate office building and a call-girl ring at a nearby apartment complex. This liaison arrangement, coupled with evidence implicating the CIA in the operation, led to the publication of Secret Agenda: Watergate, Deep Throat and the CIA by Random House in 1984. A Book of the Month Club selection, Secret Agenda was chosen by The New York Times as "one of the year's most noteworthy books." Hougan made appearances on such programs as NPR's All Things Considered, The Today Show, Good Morning America, and programs hosted by Larry King, Tom Snyder, and Regis Philbin.

External videos
- Interview with Hougan about Secret Agenda. The Today Show (NBC), with Bryant Gumbel. Season 34, Episode 51. (November 12, 1984)

In the mid-1980s, Hougan and author Sally Denton formed Hougan & Denton, a Washington-based company that did investigative research for law firms and labor unions. Clients included the AFL-CIO, the International Brotherhood of Electrical Workers (IBEW), the United Mine Workers of America, and the Service Employees International Union (SEIU). During this period, Hougan joined with Norman Mailer and Edward Jay Epstein in forming what Hougan characterized as "an invisible salon," but which The New York Times called "a small coterie of intelligence buffs, conspiracy theorists and meta-political speculators, who, with all proper self-mockery, call themselves 'the Dynamite Club.'" The group met irregularly at the Manhattan apartment of Edward Jay Epstein and at the Washington manse of Bernard "Bud" Fensterwald (founder of the Assassination Archives and Research Center in Washington, D.C.). Attendees included Dick Russell (author of The Man Who Knew Too Much), Don DeLillo (Libra and Underworld), Kevin Coogan (Dreamer of the Day), G. Gordon Liddy (Will) and others. At the time, Hougan was helping Norman Mailer in his research for what became the latter's CIA novel, Harlot's Ghost. While Mailer referred to these informal gatherings – drinks and dinner – as "meetings," the affairs had more in common with those of a salon than of an actual "club."

In early 1991, Hougan was retained as a private investigator by AFL-CIO's Industrial Union Department (IUD) and by the United Steelworkers of America (USWA). At stake were the jobs of more than 1,700 workers at the Ravenswood Aluminum Corporation (RAC) in Ravenswood, West Virginia – a demographic that constituted the majority of the town's workforce. Hougan discovered that the plant from which the workers had been locked-out was secretly controlled by Marc Rich, a fugitive billionaire and commodities broker then resident in Zug, Switzerland. For the next two years, Hougan led the investigative component of an international campaign marked by demonstrations in Switzerland and England, and by congressional hearings in Washington and parliamentary speeches in Bern. In the summer of 1992, Rich finally capitulated and the Steelworkers returned to their jobs. The Ravenswood campaign has since been called "one of the most innovative and sophisticated contract campaigns ever waged by an American union. What happened in this small West Virginia town serves as a beacon of hope for American workers..."

Hougan participated in G. Gordon Liddy's radio show on June 18, 1992, at the Watergate Hotel on the 20th anniversary of the Watergate crime, with Len Colodny along with John Barrett, Paul Leeper, and Carl Shoffler, the three arresting police officers. The event was broadcast nationwide by C-SPAN.

In 1993, Hougan became one of the first, if not the first, American journalist to return to Beirut after years of internecine warfare, kidnappings and bombings. On assignment for the television documentary program, 60 Minutes, Hougan and Lowell Bergman paved the way for Mike Wallace to interview three of Hezbollah's most powerful figures: its spiritual leader, Sheik Mohammed Hussein Fadlallah; its former Secretary-General, Sheik Subhi al-Tufayli; and Hussein Mussawi, an Iranian agent and head of Islamic Amal. Both Musawi and Tufayli have been implicated in Lebanon's torturous Hostage Crisis. The segment, titled "Three Days in Beirut," aired on January 16, 1994. Hougan continued to work for 60 Minutes over the next two years, after which he returned to writing books.

These were thrillers, all but one written with his wife, the novelist Carolyn Hougan, using the pseudonym, "John Case." The first of these of was The Genesis Code (New York: Ballantine Books, 1997), a New York Times best-seller. The First Horseman (New York: Ballantine Books, 1998) followed a year later. Kingdom Come (New York: Ballantine Books, 2000) was published under his own name, and was subsequently reprinted as The Magdalene Cipher after becoming a bestseller in Spain. To date, his subsequent novels, all written under the John Case pseudonym, include The Syndrome (2002); The Eighth Day (2002); The Murder Artist (2004); and Ghost Dancer (2007). All were published in the U.S. by Ballantine Books, a division of Random House, Inc., as well as by publishers in Europe, Asia, South America, Australia and New Zealand. Writing with his wife as "John Case," Hougan has twice been short-listed for the Hammett Prize, honoring literary excellence in crime writing.

Hougan's wife Carolyn died from stomach cancer in 2007.

In 2014, his former high school publicly recognized him and five others as "graduates of distinction." He lives in Afton, Virginia.

Hougan has been an advisory board member of the Colodny Collection at Texas A&M University since at least 2019.

Rebecca Moore endorsed Hougan's body of work as being the "most credible example of leftist conspiracy literature." She expanded on this in another article, where she writes: "I described Mr. Hougan's article in Lobster as falling within the genre of conspiracy literature. I stand by that statement, and I believe other readers of the article would agree. [...] I believe the editors published Mr. Hougan's piece because of its conspiracy themes. However, there is a difference between an article written by a professional conspiracist, and an article with a conspiracy theme written by an investigative reporter. I recognize the importance of making that distinction, and I am happy to do so."

== Filmography ==
Hougan's films include The Vodka Dons, a documentary for the Discovery Channel about the Russian Mafia in the United States.

He served as executive producer for the 1982 documentary, Frank Terpil: Confessions of a Dangerous Man. In 1998, he produced Jonestown: Mystery of a Massacre, an episode of the TV show Investigative Reports, hosted by Bill Kurtis. The documentary aired on November 9, 1998, on A&E in the United States and Channel 4 in the United Kingdom.

Hougan provided a featured interview for a 2004 episode of the television documentary series, Betrayal!, regarding disgraced CIA officer Edwin Wilson.

== Publications ==
=== Articles ===
- "Being Old and Hip & Broke in Ibiza." Alicia Patterson Foundation (1972). OCLC 990309261.

"Jim Hougan was an Alicia Patterson Foundation award winner on leave from The Capital Times newspaper in Madison, Wisconsin."

- "Blues on Calle Escorza." Alicia Patterson Foundation (1972). OCLC 24653674.
- "Mexico Raises a Counter-Culture." The Nation, vol. 215, no. 8 (September 25, 1972), pp. 238–240.

On the emergence of counterculture in Mexico and the liberalization of women's roles on young men. Explores the impact of rock lyrics on a counterculture and speculates why a conservative government and an up-tight bourgeoisie try to suppress a counter-culture without first making an attempt to understand it.

- "Kilroy's New Message: Is the script for the future written on the Men's Room wall?" Harper's Magazine (Nov. 1972), pp. 20, 22, 24, 26.
- "London: Helen Vlachos Doesn't Love You Anymore." Capital Times [Madison, Wis.], vol. 111, no. 140 (Nov. 20, 1972), p. 31.
- "Greece: The Illusion of Stability." The Nation, vol. 216, no. 11 (Mar. 12, 1973), pp. 329–334.

Discusses various political and economic issues related to Greece: economic implications of terrorism, effects of massive industrialization, and relations with other countries.

- "Hard Times at the _th_ns News." Harper's Magazine, vol. 248, no. 1487 (April 1974), pp. 24, 28–30, 32.
- "A Surfeit of Spies: The proliferation of private intelligence agencies has made civilian espionage a growth industry." Harper's Magazine (Dec. 1974), pp. 51–67.
- "Poor Birds of Paradise." Harper's Magazine (Feb. 1976), pp. 39–44.
- "Pandora's Box." Harper's Magazine (Aug. 1976)
- "The Business of Buying Friends." Harper's Magazine (Dec. 1976), p. 43.
  - Republished as Chapter 10 of Crime at the Top: Deviance in Business and the Professions (1978). ISBN 978-0397473830.
- "The Persecution and Character Assassination of Howard (Bo) Callaway as Performed by Inmates of the U.S. Senate Under the Auspices of the Democratic Party." Harper's Magazine (Jul. 1977), pp. 35–54.
- "Helmslet." Harper's Magazine (Feb. 1978), pp. 64–70.
- "The McCord File." Harper's Magazine (Jan. 1980), pp. 37-56.
- "Just When You Understood Watergate." Progressive Review (May 1986), pp. 30–31.
- "The Covert Spectrum." Whole Earth Review, no. 68 (Fall 1990), pp. 105–111. Full issue.
- "It's 1914 All Over Again." The Evening Sun [Baltimore, Mary.] (Mar. 10, 1994), p. 19A.
- "The Secret Life of Jim Jones: A Parapolitical Fugue." Lobster (UK), no. 37 (Summer 1999). Full issue. ISSN 0964-0436.
- "Many Questions Find Answers in Guyana." jonestown report, vol. 4 (November 2002).
- "Jonestown - Adkins and the NOIWON report." Investigative Notes (September 25, 2006).
- "Stopping Wikileaks is like Wrestling a Wave." Madison Capital Times (December 22, 2010), p. 28.
- "Hougan, Liddy, The Post, & Watergate." Garrison (July 9, 2019).

Undated

- "Carolyn Hougan." johncase.com.

A brief biographical profile about his wife, Carolyn, for the official John Case website.

=== Book reviews ===
- "Catholicism Berserk in the Holy Land" (May 1978). Review of Jerusalem Poker by Edward Whittemore. Harper's Magazine. pp. 68–69.
- "The Russians Have Arrived: How the West was Lost" (Jan. 1981). Review of The Spike by Arnaud de Borchgrave and Robert Moss. Harper's Magazine. pp. 77–80.
- "Less than Meets the Eye: Bob Woodward's Pseudosecrets" (Jan. 5, 1988). Review of VEIL: The Secret Wars of the CIA 1981-1987 by Bob Woodward. Village Voice [New York], vol. 33, no. 1. p. 52.

=== Books ===
- Anticipating Machine (poetry). Madison, WI: Quixote Press (1969)
- Decadence: Radical Nostalgia, Narcissism and Decline (non-fiction). New York: William Morrow (1975). ISBN 978-0688029500. OCLC 1341497.
- Spooks: The Haunting of America & the Private Use of Secret Agents (non-fiction). New York: William Morrow (1978). ISBN 978-0688033552.
- Secret Agenda: Watergate, Deep Throat, and the CIA (non-fiction). New York: Random House (1984). ISBN 978-0394514284. OCLC 10914118.
- Kingdom Come (novel). New York: Ballantine Books (2000). ISBN 978-0345433244; Paperback edition.
  - Republished as The Magdalene Cipher in 2000 by Avon Books, New York. ISBN 978-0060846268. OCLC 1004882020. Published in London by Arrow Books (2006).

=== Published as John Case ===
- The Genesis Code. New York: Ballantine Books (1998). ISBN 978-0345483539.
- The Syndrome. New York: Ballantine Books (2001). ISBN 978-0345433084.
- The Eighth Day. New York: Ballantine Books (2002). ISBN 978-0345433091.
- The First Horseman. New York: Ballantine Books (2004)
- The Murder Artist. New York: Ballantine Books (2004). ISBN 978-0345464712.
- Ghost Dancer. New York: Ballantine Books (2006). ISBN 978-0345464736.
  - UK edition: The Dance of Death. London: Arrow Books (2007). ISBN 978-0099464969.

=== Further reading ===
- Evans, M. Stanton. "Truth About Watergate Begins to Surface." Human Events (November 9, 1985)
- Garvin, Glenn. "Hougan: Anti-hero." Washington Times (December 10, 1984), p. B1.
- "Hougan, Jim 1942-." Encyclopedia.com.
- "Interview: Jim Hougan" (September 2001), for PBS Frontline: "Target America." S19, E12 (October 4, 2001). Archived from the original.
- Moore, Rebecca. "Reconstructing Reality: Conspiracy Theories About Jonestown." Journal of Popular Culture, vol. 36, no. 2 (Fall 2002), pp. 200-220. Archived from the original.
- Spencer, Scott. "Hope & Hard Times." Rolling Stone, no. 629 (April 30, 1992), pp. 44-.
- Weisberg, Harold A. Note on Spooks by Jim Hougan (undated)
