= Retta Long =

Australian baptist missionary who founded Australian Inland Mission

Margaret Jane Long (nee. Dixon)
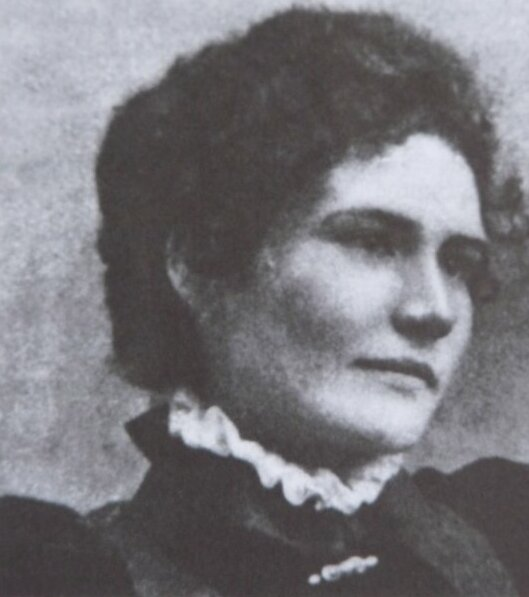
- Retta Dixon
- Born: April 5, 1878; Ultimo, Sydney, Australia
- Died: October 18, 1956 (aged 78); Normanhurst, New South Wales, Australia
- Burial place: Rookwood Cemetery
- Spouse: Leonard Long

Margaret "Retta" Jane Long (5 April 1878 – 18 October 1956; née Dixon) was an Australian Baptist missionary who founded the Aborigines Inland Mission of Australia. The Retta Dixon Home for Aboriginal girls in Darwin was named after her.

== Early life ==
Margaret "Retta" Jane Long (née Dixon) was born 5 April 1878 in Ultimo, Sydney, to Irish-born Baptist parents Matthew and Matilda Dixon.

Dixon became a member of Petersham Baptist Church before joining the New South Wales Christian Endeavour Union. This brought her into contact with Aboriginal people at the Aboriginal reserve at La Perouse. It was here that Christian Endeavor held Sunday services for the Indigenous people.

== Working life ==
=== La Perouse Mission ===
The La Perouse Aborigines' Reserve became the New South Wales Aborigines Mission (NSWAM) and in 1899 Dixon became the first resident missionary.

Dixon travelled to Aboriginal communities in New South Wales to preach, with help from La Perouse Aboriginal Community. She journeyed to the south coast, the Hawkesbury, and the mid-north coast.

NSWAM resolved in 1902 to function as a "faith mission" with Dixon acting as publicist. Around 1903, she took the young Emma Callaghan with her when she visited the Dunggutti people at the Nulla Nulla Aborigines' Reserve, Bellbrook, which helped Callaghan with her ambitions to become a nurse.

=== Aborigines Inland Mission ===
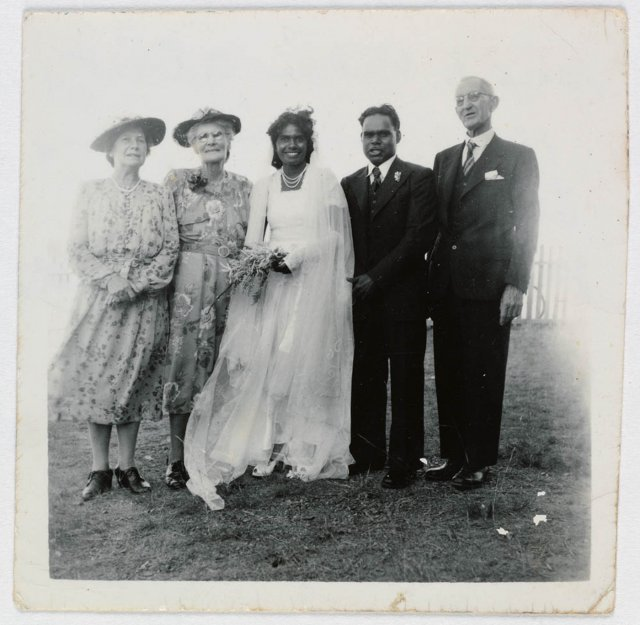
Mrs Irving, Mrs Retta Long, bride Aileen Willis, groom Don Brady and Mr Irving. Wedding at Cherbourg AIM in 1952

In 1905 Dixon left the NSWAM to establish the Aborigines Inland Mission of Australia (AIM).

At Singleton Baptist Church on 11 January 1906, she married Leonard Long, who became co-director of AIM. They were to have seven children, two of whom did not survive infancy.

AIM began working in Aboriginal communities on recently gazetted reserves and with government permission, built churches and houses. In 1910, AIM's headquarters moved to Sydney and local and interstate branches were established in the decades that followed.

AIM had 43 missionaries in 1931 and 52 by 1940.

Leonard Long died on 28 December 1928 and Retta continued as sole director with support from their son Arnold, driving the AIM van.

=== Training college and Retta Dixon Home ===
In the 1930s a series of conventions were held, where she promoted her plan for a native training college. After a fund was created and a suitable premises was found, the Native Training College was opened in Port Stephens, where the first two students entered in 1938.

The Retta Dixon Home was opened using a subsidy given to Darwin missionaries when they returned in 1946 after they were evacuated and asked to care for Aboriginal evacuees during World War 2.

The Port Stephens Training College, which was also evacuated during the war, was moved to Dalwood in rented premises and in 1946, moved to Minimbah House, Whittingham, after AIM bought it. In 1953, the Native Training College was renamed to the A.I.M. Bible Training Institute and opened to applicants from other missions.

== Later life and death ==
Dixon retired from her position as director of AIM in 1953 due to ill-health, her family relieving her of much of her duties. Her son, Rev. Egerton Long, took over as director.

Dixon died aged 78 on 18 October 1956, survived by three daughters and two sons. She was buried in Rookwood Cemetery with Baptist forms.

== Publications ==
Published under the name Retta Long:

- Providential channels (Sydney: Aborigines Inland Mission of Australia, 1935)
- In the way of His steps: a brief outline of three decades of history of the Aborigines Inland Mission of Australia, 1905-1935 (Sydney: Aborigines Inland Mission of Australia, 1936)
- The Aboriginal as a subject of the Kingdom of God (Sydney: Aborigines Inland Mission of Australia, [196-?])
