= Carolyn Hougan =

American novelist

- Born: Carolyn Johnson; 1943; United States
- Died: February 25, 2007 (aged 63–64); United States
- Occupation: Author
- Spouse: Jim Hougan
- Writing career
- Pen name: John Case
- Genre: Fiction

Carolyn Hougan (1943 – February 25, 2007) was an American author.

Born in 1943 to Samuel and Elisabeth Johnson, Carolyn graduated from Scotch Plains High School of New Jersey. She was a Peabody scholar at the now-non-existent Western College for Women. She graduated with honors from the University of Wisconsin. In Madison, Wisconsin, Carolyn met Jim Hougan in the philosophy course "Freedom, Fate, and Choice." She became Carolyn Hougan in 1966. The Hougans lived in Alexandria and Washington from 1980 until August 2006.

== Works ==
She herself authored four thrillers: Shooting in the Dark (1984), Blood Relative, The Romeo Flag, and The Last Goodbye. Carolyn Hougan died from cancer February 25, 2007, in Virginia at age 63. She was survived by her husband, Jim, a daughter, son, and two grandchildren.

The series of books written under the pseudonym John Case were written jointly by Carolyn and Jim Houghan, and have not continued without Carolyn. The titles of the John Case works are: The Genesis Code, The First Horseman, The Syndrome (Trance State), The Eighth Day, The Murder Artist, and Ghost Dancer.
