= Australian Indigenous Ministries =

Interdenominational Australian Christian organisation

Australian Indigenous Ministries, formerly Aborigines Inland Mission of Australia (both AIM), is an interdenominational Christian organisation that provides ministries to Aboriginal Australians. Aborigines Inland Mission of Australia was established in 1905, and ran many Aboriginal missions across Australia, including the Retta Dixon Home in Darwin, Northern Territory, St Clair Mission in Singleton, New South Wales.

The Aborigines Inland Mission published two monthly newsletters, Our AIM and The Australian Evangel.

The organisation re-branded to Australian Indigenous Ministries in 1998.

== History ==
The Petersham Christian Endeavour Society built a house at La Perouse, near Botany Bay in New South Wales, in November 1894, where a Miss J. Watson took up residence and began working among the local Indigenous peoples. After her resignation due to ill-health in 1896, Retta Dixon took over the house and work. She moved to the Singleton area in the Hunter Valley in 1905, where the Aborigines Inland Mission of Australia was formed. The inaugural public meeting was held on 11 September 1905 in the Singleton Methodist Church, which established the Aborigines Inland Mission of Australia (AIM). (Note: Sometimes spelt with an apostrophe: Aborigine's Inland Mission)

Soon after opening approved to build missions in Queensland and Western Australia. She married Leonard Long and around 1909, AIM set up a centre at Herberton in Far North Queensland. It created its first Indigenous training college by 1938.

=== Management ===
By 1906 AIM had ten missionaries, including employing three Indigenous people. Aboriginal assistants were employed where possible, given the roles of pastors, missionaries, local assistants, deacons and deaconesses. The mission was considered unique due to being mostly female; they mainly recruited young single women. Between 1905 and 1968, 243 women worked for the organisation, with many of them living in poverty, similar to the Indigenous people. By 1935 they had 50 missionaries, 20 associates and 36 Indigenous employees.

The Australia Indigenous Mission Church took responsibility for things such as the appointment of pastors, the handling of properties, and oversight of a bible school based in Rockhampton which provided short-term and long-term courses in a number of centres. Each mission was run independently.

=== Retta Dixon Home ===
AIM began working in the Top End in the 1930s. In 1946 the AIM founded the Retta Dixon Home, an institution for Aboriginal children, on the Bagot Aboriginal Reserve in Darwin, Northern Territory.

During the Royal Commission into Institutional Responses to Child Sexual Abuse in 2015, it was found that AIM did not provide sufficient training to its staff on how to detect or respond to allegations of child sexual abuse. Compensation was initially awarded to 71 people in a 2017 out-of-court settlement. Since then, at least ten people have applied for compensation under the Australian Government's National Redress Scheme (NRS), which was set up for people who have experienced institutional child abuse. However the government has prevented Australian Indigenous Ministries (AIM) from being a participant in the NRS, for the stated reason that the group cannot afford to pay out potential claimants. There is a possibility that funding could be drawn from a government body, as a "funder of last resort", during the 2021 review of the scheme. Claimants and the AIM are exploring ways in which AIM could make a meaningful apology to survivors of abuse suffered at the home.

=== St Clair Mission ===
St Clair Mission was located between Muswellbrook and Singleton in a place called Carrowbrook. Many Aboriginal groups sought refuge at James White's property in the 1860s. The mission was opened by Reverend James White and was run by Baptist missionary Retta Dixon in 1893. It was established as a church and school, and Indigenous people used to farm the land. In 1905 Dixon took formal control of St Clair.

It was closed in 1918 when it taken over by the Aborigines Protection Board (as an Aboriginal reserve) and renamed Mount Olive Reserve. In 1920 the missionaries moved out, and the home was closed down in 1923.

=== Singleton Aboriginal Children's Home ===
Singleton was used for both females and males from birth up to the age of 14. The Aborigines Protection Board used it to place children removed from stations and reserves until 1920.

=== Aborigines Inland Mission Bible Training College ===
The Aborigines Inland Mission Bible Training College was located in Minimbah House, and opened in 1953 to replace the Native Workers' Training College. Its goal was to provide Baptist ministry for Indigenous teenagers and young people from all over Australia. It closed in 1973.

== Teachings ==
Their philosophy was exclusively Protestant with a generally conservative outlook and evangelical nature. They focused on being nonconformist, the primacy of the bible and personal salvation. AIM did not involve themselves with organisations that took the children who became the Stolen Generations; their only concern was salvation, and assisting those who were "eager to read God's word".

The main mission of AIM was the salvation and expanding the Biblical knowledge of those who were "eager to read God's word', with a particular emphasis placed on preaching, teaching, and applying the word of God.The foundational belief of the AIM was that teaching life skills, providing better health and education, as well as having the ability to resist temptation and trouble would build a better Aboriginal Christian community. Some missionaries undertook a teaching role to create Indigenous Christian following. Other missionaries decided to walk around communities visiting small groups and families some walking thousands of kilometres each year.

Retta Dixon said that within the organisation's 30-year history up to 1935 that there had been 11,000 people under their spiritual care, 35 centres, 100 outposts and 106 "agents at work".

== Publications ==
The Australian Inland Mission published two monthly newsletters: Our AIM and The Australian Evangel, targeting different readerships. Our AIM (also referred to as just AIM) targeted evangelical European Australians, and promoted AIM's work within Aboriginal communities. It was published from 1907 until at least May 1961. Evangel targeted mainly Aboriginal people, promoting the benefits of evangelical Christian beliefs, and was published from before 1930 until at least September 1966.

Back copies of both of these publications are available for free perusal on the AIATSIS website. The Australian Indigenous Index, or INFOKOORI, is an index to the fortnightly newspaper Koori Mail as well as to biographical information from various magazines, including Our AIM (1907–1961).

== Today ==
The organisation re-branded to Australian Indigenous Ministries in 1998.

Australian Indigenous Ministries is an interdenominational Christian organisation that provides ministries to Aboriginal Australians.

== Locations ==
Australian Indigenous Missionaries had Longs' Children, St Clair Mission, Singleton House, Native Workers' Training and the Singleton Bible Training Institute. Missionaries were placed in major centres like Darwin and Alice Springs or in Aboriginal communities and outback towns.

The Orphan House was opened on 14 August 1907, transferred to another organisation in 1918 and closed in 1923.

The mission stations were established in the following locations:

=== New South Wales ===
- Singleton
- Karuah
- Yass
- Brungle
- Warangesda
- Cummeragunja
- Walcha

=== Northern Territory ===
- Parap

=== Queensland ===
- Gayndah
- Cherbourg
- Woorabinda
- Palm Island
- Normanton
- Stradbroke Island
- Ravenshoe
- Herberton
- Cooktown

=== South Australia ===
- Port Augusta
- Tarcoola

=== Western Australia ===
- Bassendean
