= 14 Days (film) =

2014 film

- Film poster
- Directed by: Joseph Villapaz
- Written by: Joseph Villapaz
- Produced by: Joseph Villapaz
- Starring: Emily Dennis; Michael Wetherbee; Johanna Finn; Liam Wildes; Jamie Munsey; Tiana Fernandez; Cara Maltz; Luke Bond; Jarrod Luke; Alisa Murray; Jason Jiang; Costin Becheanu; Jenny Hutton; Sarah Grace Sanders; Malin Edengard; Shannon Beck; Abigail Patrick; Gina Berceau
- Cinematography: Joseph Villapaz
- Edited by: Joseph Villapaz
- Production company: Shami Media Group
- Distributed by: Amazon Prime Video
- Release date: October 19, 2014 (Producers Club)
- Running time: 63 minutes
- Country: United States
- Language: English
- Budget: $10,000

14 DAYS is a 2014 American science fiction experimental film, written and directed by Joseph Villapaz. It stars Emily Dennis and Michael Wetherbee and takes place in New York City. It has screened at the Alhambra Theatre Film Festival, Motor City Nightmares, NewFilmmakers Spring Screening Series and at the New Jersey Film Festival. It received 4th Place in the Best Sci-Fi Short Film category at the 2015 International Horror Hotel film festival and an honorable mention in the Best Feature Film category at the Los Angeles Film Review Independent Film Awards.

== Plot ==
Consisting of a variety of short stories tied together by a larger plot, each segment introduces an issue that the characters deal with. All scenes take place in one location and the audiences view is of the park bench and its immediate area. However, there are some exceptions such as the scene where the thief runs through the city, eventually arriving in the park. There are breaks between days, simulating that nothing interesting happens on some days. The days are titled on screen to indicate a passage of time. Without this, the scenes would appear to occur on the same day because the weather and time of day don't appear to change. However, for scenes that occur right after the previous one, the title is omitted as for scenes for Day 11 - Sisters and Day 13 - Closure.

=== Day 1 - Coffee ===
Josh meets Lita in the park. She appears to be troubled by something so he offers her a cup of coffee to help ease her stress. They engage in a humorous conversation but a paging signal on Lita's phone ruins the atmosphere and the two head off immediately to the destination mentioned in the page.

=== Day 3 - Moving On ===
June is on a train holding a red rose but she becomes distressed when its leaves fall apart. She arrives in the park to meet her husband, Michael. They talk about their children, June's sister's relationships and eventually their own. Michael urges June to move on with her life and put his tragic death behind her. They embrace and have a passionate kiss. Before June leaves, Michael gives her a rose then fades away. As presented, one could speculate that the scene could play out in an infinite loop since June had a rose in the beginning and at the end, in a way representing her failing to break the cycle and move on with her life.

=== Day 5 - Family ===
Trix joins Carmidy for lunch. They enjoy some conversation before Carmidy reveals her desire to have children with her former boyfriend. Trix, all too eager for Carmidy to move forward, agrees then they leave to return to work.

=== Day 7 - Choice ===
Lita and Josh appear again, this time next to a river in the city. After some humorous discussion about pets, Josh reveals that he submitted a request for transfer to a team that specializes in investigating strange and unusual events. Lita becomes visibly and verbally distraught before the paging signal on Josh's phone interrupts and the two go to the scene.

=== Day 9 - Siblings ===
Hope meets brother Destin in the park for an annual family get together. Their brother, Moff, arrives a few minutes later after Hope and Destin talk about his childish past. After being out of touch for a year, each has undergone significant changes. Moff and Destin express their happiness at Hope's slimmer figure, Destin says he's finishing up medical school and Moff is engaged. Moff has apparently become more mature with his childish antics behind him. However, after Destin talks about how proud he was of Moff defending him when others taunted him about being adopted, Hope reveals that after doing some research, she discovered that she was also adopted.

=== Day 11 - The Hidden ===
Zenia, an Obsidian from The Magnate civilization, is held captive in a dark room interrogated by an unknown and unseen being. Only its deep ominous voice is heard. What appears to be a spotlight is directed at Zenia's face. However, the light isn't completely stationary so perhaps it is illuminated from the interrogator. Zenia is questioned about her mission on Earth. She explains that she and Essix were sent to "pacify" the terrorist threat by killing them and destroying their arsenal of weapons. In doing so, they discovered residual energy from weapons made by their enemy, The Quaazen, but don't know how humans acquired alien technology originating from a distant galaxy. Recovering from injuries from her fight with the terrorists, Zenia quickly materializes away from her captors.

=== Day 11 - Sisters ===
Some time later, another Obsidian is in the park where Zenia and Essex were captured. Her superior, The Overseer, materializes and confirms Zenia and Essix's safe return but is concerned why she is still on Earth. The Obsidian explains she is investigating how the humans may have gotten Quaazen weapons and expresses her longing to return home. The Overseer acknowledges how The Obsidian's personality is like their mother's and The Obsidian acknowledges how The Overseer's personality is like their father's. This leads to concern of a greater threat than the Quaazen, The Reapers, trans-dimensional beings whose only goal is to harvest all forms of energy.

=== Day 13 - Thief ===
A man cautiously runs through the city streets constantly looking around if he is being followed. He stops in a secluded area of the park and begins to look through a bag he has just stolen. Finding cash, a wallet and a cellphone, he plays a voicemail on the phone. The voicemail is by a man to his wife apologizing for his short temper and explains what he is doing to solve his problem. At the conclusion of the voicemail, the thief becomes conflicted with guilt, pushes the bag and its contents to the side then walks away without taking anything. Throughout the scene, the thief is never seen speaking. The only voice is from the voicemail coming from the cellphone's speaker. The viewer is left wondering if the voice on the phone was probably the thief's conscience all along.

=== Day 13 - Closure ===
Lita and Josh traced the stolen bag to the park where the thief left it. It seems when the thief retrieved the voicemail, it triggered something which could be traced. Lita tries to explain this but Josh disagrees. Lita returns playful remarks then suddenly embraces Josh and gives him a passionate kiss. Lita says "YES" but Josh is confused. Lita reminds him of the dream he told her many times about proposing on the Spanish Steps in Italy, but didn't when they actually were on vacation there. This was enough for Josh to pull out the engagement ring from his pocket and confesses waiting for the right moment and puts it on Lita's finger. Both relieved, they hug and kiss then Lita's phone rings. Instead of another call to investigate another crime, it's a text from Lita's mother saying her phone was on and she heard the whole proposal. Josh picks up his phone reading a message that Lita's parents called his parents about the news. Thinking that all surprises have been revealed, Lita briefly mentions a baby shower in a comment peaking Josh's curiosity. The viewer is left wondering if Lita was distressed in the beginning because she was pregnant but not married to Josh or maybe she was just hinting at wanting to be.

=== Day 14 - Scouts ===
Two alien scouts from a race formally a part of The Magnate civilization, materialize in the park. The leader, Onyx, after observing human relationships over the past 14 days, expresses disappointment that humans are perhaps weak by constantly engaging in trivial conflicts. Saph, on the other hand, believes their good qualities is actually a strength that is worth considering. Onyx describes The Reaper threat in detail. The scene ends from the opposite view for the first time showing Onyx and Saph in the foreground and the cityscape in the background.

=== Bonus Scene - Subversive ===
On February 28, 2016, a 12-minute film titled, Subversive, screened at the Anthology Film Festival in New York City. Not a part of the "Day" scenes, Subversive blurs the line between reality and fiction and can be viewed without ever having seen 14 Days. A talk show host interviews the director of 14 Days, portrayed by a woman, while the real-life director, Joseph Villapaz, makes a cameo appearance as an on-set producer. This starts off "normally" but suddenly turns darker with an edgy sci-fi and horror tone. The film has since been added to 14 Days, however, it has also been submitted to film festivals as a separate short film and selected to the Prelude2Cinema Presents Film Festival, Women's Only Entertainment Film Festival and Los Angeles CineFest.

On June 12, 2016, Subversive will be screening at the International Horror Hotel Film Festival. It has also been awarded an Honorable Mention.

== Reception ==
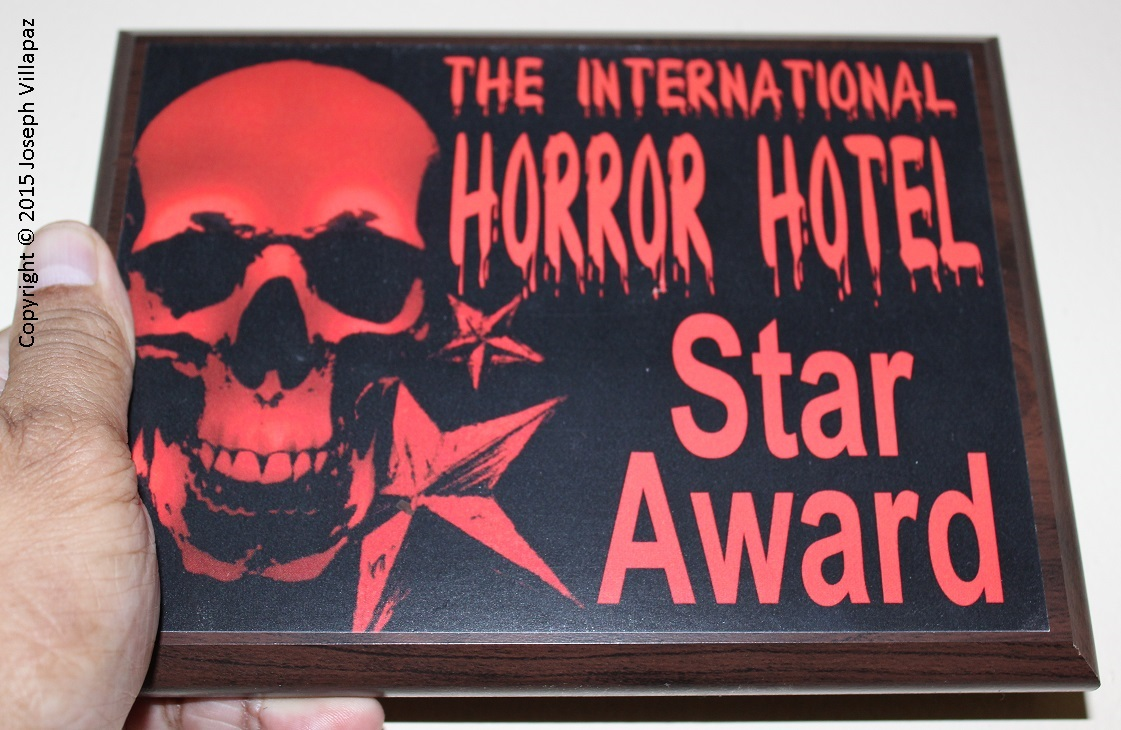
International Horror Hotel 4th Place Award

Reviewer Carl Burgess of ScreenCritix, pointed out budget limitations but still said it was "watchable and entertaining". However, reviewer Misty Layne of Rogue Cinema was very positive of the film concluding "good actors and a good story make for a fine film".

== Awards and Selections [14 Days] ==
14 DAYS has received the following recognitions:

Event	Accolade	Category	Date
Los Angeles Film Awards	Honorable Mention	Original Story/Script	November 28, 2016
Fantasy Anime Sci-Fi Horror Film Festival	Official Selection	Sci-Fi Experimental Feature	November 15, 2016
Newark International Film Festival	Official Selection	Narrative Feature	September 9, 2016
The Indie Gathering International Film Festival	Honorable Mention	Short Film	August 14, 2016
Fly Film Festival	Nominee Official Selection	Best Actor in a Short Film (Emily Dennis) Short Film	August 6, 2016
Chautauqua International Film Festival	1st Place Official Selection	Best Short Film Short Film	July 17, 2016
Chandler International Film Festival	Official Selection	Best Experimental Film	June 30, 2016
Hollywood Boulevard Film Festival	Official Selection	Best Experimental Film	June 24, 2016
Amarcord Arthouse Television & Video Festival	Official Selection	Experimental Film	June 11, 2016
Flying Frame Film Festival	Official Selection	Strictly Experimental	May 21, 2016
Women's Only Entertainment Film Festival	Official Selection	Short	May 5, 2016
Northern Virginia International Film & Music Festival	Artist Circle Award of Merit	Feature Film	April 30, 2016
Prelude2Cinema Presents	Official Selection	Indie Feature	March 29, 2016
INFLUXPalooza	Finalist	Feature Film	January 14, 2016
Culver City Film Festival	Official Selection	Feature Film	December 1, 2015
American Motion Picture Society	Shortlist	Drama	November 13, 2015
Nevada International Film Festival	Silver Screen Award	Experimental Film	November 14, 2015
Terror Film Festival	Claw Award Nominee; Nominee; Nominee; Nominee; Official Selection	Best Cinematography Best Director; Best Science Fiction Short Film; Best Short Film Screenplay; Best Sound Design; Science Fiction Short Film	October 29–31, 2015
Legends of Hollywood Film Festival	Official Selection	Feature	October 21, 2015
Fright Night Film Festival	Official Selection	Horror Paranormal Feature	October 16, 2015
Hollywood International Moving Pictures Film Festival	Official Selection	Feature Film (Sci-Fi)	October 5, 2015
Great Lakes International Film Festival	Official Selection	Horror	October 3, 2015
Best Shorts Competition	Award of Recognition	Experimental	September 30, 2015
Los Angeles CineFest	Official Selection	Short Film (60 min or less)	September 2, 2015
Accolade Global Film Competition	Award of Recognition	Experimental	August 31, 2015
Miami Independent Film Festival	Official Selection	Medium Length Narrative (under 60 min)	August 31, 2015
International Independent Film Awards	Honorable Mention	Experimental	August 28, 2015
The Indie Fest Film Awards	Award of Recognition	Experimental	July 25, 2015
New Jersey Film Festival	Official Selection	Experimental	June 14, 2015
International Horror Hotel	4th Place	Sci-Fi Short Film	June 7, 2015
Los Angeles Film Review Independent Film Awards	Honorable Mention	Best Feature Film	May 31, 2015
NewFilmmakers New York	Official Selection	Narrative Feature	April 29, 2015
Motor City Nightmares	Official Selection	Sci-Fi Feature	April 25, 2015
Alhambra Theatre Film Festival	Official Selection	Narrative Feature	April 11, 2015
Actors Awards	Winner Winner; Nominee; Nominee; Nominee; Nominee	Best Actress in an Indie Film - Emily Dennis Best Actor in an Indie Film - Michael Wetherbee; Best Performance of Fest - Emily Dennis; Best Performance of Fest - Michael Wetherbee; Best Actress - Emily Dennis; Best Actor - Michael Wetherbee	April 9, 2019

== Awards and Selections [Subversive] ==
SUBVERSIVE has received the following recognitions:

Event	Accolade	Category	Date
Big Fandom Film Festival	Official Selection	Short Film	November 19, 2016
ICP Entertainment Short Film Series	Nominee	Best Horror Film	October 28, 2016
Terror Film Festival	Claw Award Official Selection	Best Science Fiction Short Film Science Fiction Short Film	October 20-23, 2016
StarGate Galactic International Sci-Fi Fantasy & Horror Film Festival	Official Selection	Short	August 28, 2016
Milwaukee Women's Film Festival	Official Selection	Short Film	August 20, 2016
The Indie Gathering International Film Festival	Honorable Mention	Short Film	August 14, 2016
International Independent Film Awards	Honorable Mention	Experimental Film	June 22, 2016
Pop Ninja Sci-Fi Short Film Festival	Official Selection	Sci-Fi Short Film	July 1, 2016
Amarcord Arthouse Television & Video Festival	Official Selection	Sci-Fi/Horror Film	June 11, 2016
Flying Frame Film Festival	Official Selection	Strictly Experimental	May 21, 2016
Miami Independent Film Festival	Official Selection	Short Narrative	May 2, 2016
International Horror Hotel	Honorable Mention Official Selection	Film Film	June 12, 2016
Los Angeles CineFest	Official Selection	Short Film	April 17, 2016
Women's Only Entertainment Film Festival	Official Selection	Short	March 30, 2016
Prelude2Cinema Presents	Official Selection	Indie Short	March 29, 2016
