= Amanda Williams (cricketer) =

Australian cricketer (born 1988)

Personal information
- Full name: Amanda Lee Williams
- Born: 6 September 1988 (age 38); Auckland, New Zealand
- Batting: Right-handed
- Bowling: Right-arm medium
- Role: All-rounder

Domestic team information
- Years: Team
- 2006/07–2014/15: Western Australia

Career statistics
Competition	WLA	WT20
Matches	25	14
Runs scored	185	39
Batting average	11.56	6.50
100s/50s	0/0	0/0
Top score	21*	10
Balls bowled	542	150
Wickets	10	11
Bowling average	43.10	12.27
5 wickets in innings	0	0
10 wickets in match	0	0
Best bowling	2/28	3/13
Catches/stumpings	5/–	1/–
- Source: CricketArchive, 7 July 2021

Amanda Lee Williams (born 6 September 1988) is a former Australian cricketer. An all-rounder, she bats right-handed and bowls right-arm medium pace. She played 25 List A matches for Western Australia between the 2006–07 and 2014–15 seasons of the Women's National Cricket League (WNCL). She also made 14 appearances for Western Australia in the Australian Women's Twenty20 Cup.

Williams was born in Auckland, New Zealand. She is a sarcoma survivor, having been diagnosed with the disease in 2015.
