= Jennine Capó Crucet =

American novelist

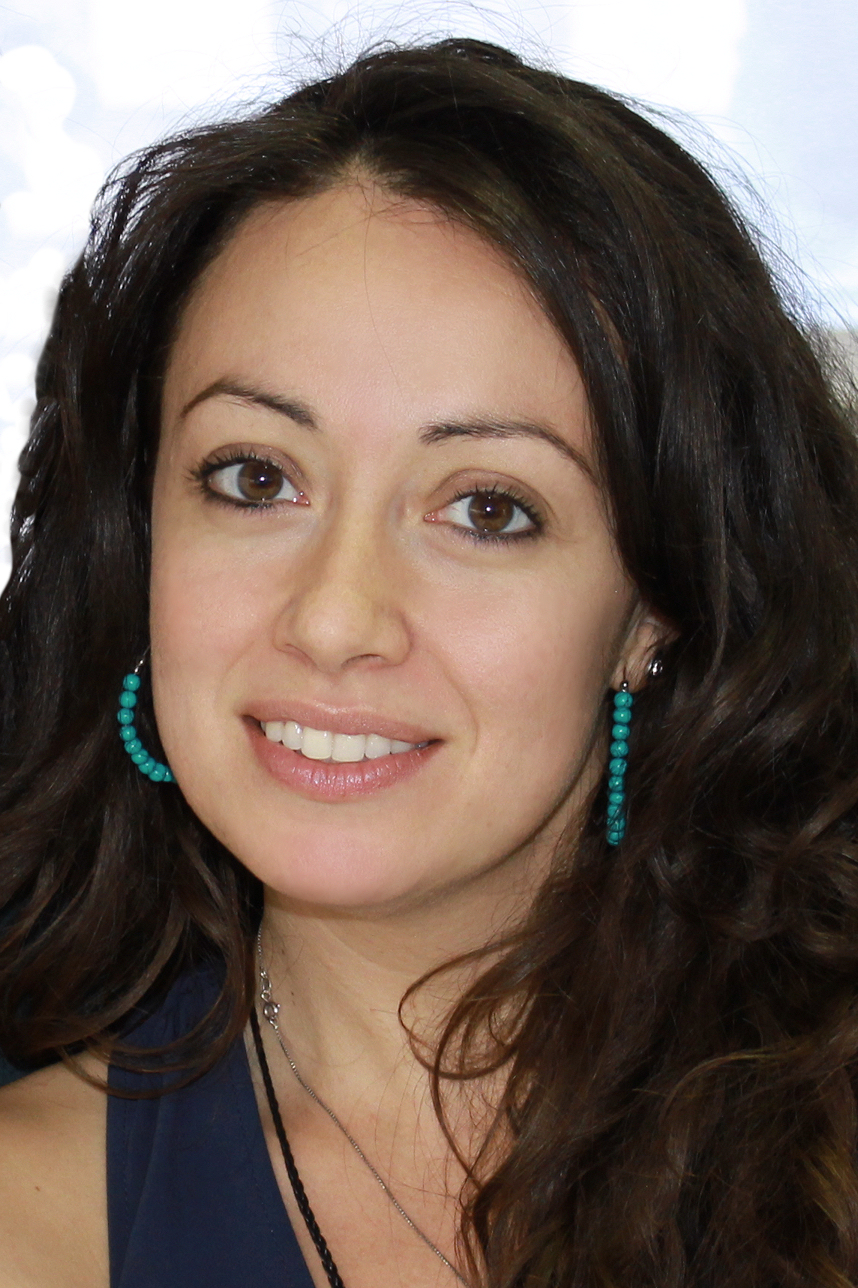
- Crucet in 2015
- Education: Cornell University (BA); University of Minnesota (MFA)
- Occupations: Novelist; short story writer
- Website: jcapocrucet.com

Jennine Capó Crucet is an American novelist and short story writer.

== Life ==
Capó Crucet attended Cornell University where she received a B.A. in English and Feminist, Gender and Sexuality Studies. She also graduated from the University of Minnesota with an M.F.A. in Creative Writing. She is currently an Associate Professor of English and Ethnic Studies at the University of Nebraska–Lincoln.

Her work has appeared in The New York Times.

Capó Crucet is best known for her short story collection How to Leave Hialeah which focuses on her experiences as a Cuban-American woman growing up in a working-class neighborhood of Miami. For this collection she won the John Gardner Book Award. Her second book, Make Your Home Among Strangers, was released in 2015. This book became the subject of controversy when students at Georgia Southern University burned a copy on a grill after a question-and-answer session by Capó Crucet. The book burned at Georgia Southern University was My Time Among the Whites.

Capó Crucet's 2024 novel Say Hello to My Little Friend was published to positive review, with the New York Times calling it "an impossible-to-define but highly digestible novel about Cuban heritage, migration, motherhood and the heartbreaking way young men float through life lost and desperate for meaning".

== Awards ==
- O. Henry Award
- Joyce Carol Oates Literary Prize
- Iowa Short Fiction Prize
- John Gardner Book Award
- L.A. Times Book Award (Fiction) 2024

== Publications ==
- —— (2009). How to Leave Hialeah. University of Iowa Press. ISBN 9781587298790.
- —— (2015). Make Your Home Among Strangers. St. Martin's Press. ISBN 9781250059666.
- —— (2019). My Time Among the Whites: Notes from an Unfinished Education. Picador. ISBN 9781250299437.
- —— (2024). Say Hello to My Little Friend. Simon & Schuster. ISBN 9781668023327.
