= John Case (novelist) =

American novelist

- Born: Jim Hougan and Carolyn Hougan; United States
- Occupation: Author
- Writing career
- Genre: Fiction

John Case is the pseudonym of Jim Hougan and Carolyn Hougan, husband and wife, both published authors in their own right. They were nominated for the 2002 and 2006 Hammett Prize.

Jim Hougan is also an investigative journalist and broadcaster. He lives in Afton, Virginia.

The joint writings of Jim and Carolyn have now ended following the death of Carolyn Hougan from cancer on February 25, 2007.

== Published works ==
Under the pseudonym, the Hougans authored six novels:

- The Genesis Code (1997)
- The First Horseman (1998)
- The Syndrome (2001; published as Trance State in the UK)
- The Eighth Day (2002)
- The Murder Artist (2004)
- Ghost Dancer (2006; published as The Dance of Death in the UK)
