= Louise Titchener =

American novelist (born 1941)

Louise F. Titchener
- Born: 1941 (age 84–85); Detroit, Michigan, U.S.
- Occupation: Novelist
- Children: 2
- Writing career
- Pen name: Alyssa Howard (with Eileen Buckholtz, Ruth Glick, and Carolyn Males), Alexis Hill, Alexis Hill Jordan, Anne Silverlock, Jane Silverwood, and Tess Marlowe (with Ruth Glick), Clare Richards and Clare Richmond (with Carolyn Males)
- Language: English
- Period: 1982–present
- Genre: Romance
- Website: www.mysteriousbaltimore.com

Louise F. Titchener (born 1941 in Detroit, Michigan) is an American novelist. She wrote under various pseudonyms: Alyssa Howard (with Eileen Buckholtz, Ruth Glick, and Carolyn Males), Alexis Hill, Alexis Hill Jordan, Anne Silverlock, Jane Silverwood, and Tess Marlowe (with Ruth Glick), and Clare Richards and Clare Richmond (with Carolyn Males).

== Biography ==
Louise Titchener was born in Detroit, Michigan, United States. She married with a philosophy student and moved to Ohio, where she obtained a master's degree and taught freshman English and her husband became a Philosophy Professor. The marriage had two sons, who grew up in Maryland. She now is a grandmother.

She is member of the Washington Romance Writers, a chapter of the Romance Writers of America.

== Awards ==
- Love is Elected (1982) Romantic Times Nominee for Best Romance
- "Déjà Vu" (1996) A TRR 5 Heart Keeper Winner
- "Buried in Baltimore" (2001) EPPIE 2002 Winner

== Bibliography ==
=== As Alyssa Howard ===
==== Single novels ====
- Love is Elected (1982)
- Southern Persuasion (1983)

=== As Alexis Hill ===
==== Single novels ====
- In the Arms of Love (1983 Feb)

=== As Alexis Hill Jordan ===
==== Single novels ====
- Brian's Captive (1983 Aug)
- Reluctant Merger (1983 Dec)
- Summer Wine (1984 Jul)
- Beginner's Luck (1984 Dec)
- Mistaken Image (1985 Mar)
- Hopelessly Devoted (1985 Jul)
- Summer Stars (1985 Sep)
- Stolen Passions (1986 Aug)

=== As Anne Silverlock ===
==== Single novels ====
- Casanova's Master (1984)
- Aphrodite's Promise (1985)
- An Invincible Love (1985)
- With Each Caress (1985)
- Fantasy Lover (1986)
- In the Heat of the Sun (1986)

==== Omnibus ====
- The Best of Anne Silverlock: With Each Caress / Casanova's Master (1992)

=== As Clare Richards ===
==== Single novels ====
- Renaissance Summer (1985 Mar)

=== As Clare Richmond ===
==== Single novels ====
- Runaway heart (1986 Nov)
- Bride's Inn (1987 Sep)
- Pirate's legacy (1990 Jul)
- Hawaiian Heat (1993 Feb)

=== As Tess Marlowe ===
==== Single novels ====
- Indiscreet (1988)

=== As Jane Silverwood ===
==== The Byrnside Inheritance ====
1. High Stakes (1991)
2. Dark Waters (1991)
3. Bright Secrets (1991)

==== Single novels ====
- Voyage of the Heart (1985)
- A Permanent Arrangement (1986)
- The Tender Trap (1987)
- Slow Melt (1987)
- Beyond Mere Words (1988)
- Handle with Care (1989)
- Eye of the Jaguar (1993)
- Silent Starlight (1994)

=== As Louise Titchener ===
==== Toni Credella Mysteries Series ====
1. Homebody (1993)
2. Buried in Baltimore (2001)
3. Burned in Baltimore (2003)
4. Bumped Off in Baltimore (2005)

==== Baltimore Historical Mysteries Series ====
1. Gunshy (2004)
2. Malpractice (2006)

==== Fortunes Series Multi-Author ====
6. The Dress Circle (1988)

==== Single Novels ====
- Greenfire (1993)
- Mantrap (1994)
- Déjà Vu (1996)
