= Eileen Buckholtz =

American novelist (born 1949)

- Born: Eileen Garber; February 1, 1949 (age 77)
- Occupation: Novelist
- Spouse: Howard Buckholtz (m. 1970)
- Children: 2
- Writing career
- Pen name: Alyssa Howard (with Ruth Glick, Carolyn Males, Louise Titchener), Eileen Buckholtz, Amanda Lee and Samantha Chase (with Ruth Glick), Rebecca York (until 1997 with Ruth Glick)
- Language: English
- Period: 1982–1997
- Genre: Romance

Eileen Buckholtz (née Garber; born February 1, 1949) is an American novelist, active from 1982 to 1997. She wrote under her married name in collaboration with Ruth Glick, and also in collaboration with her under the pseudonyms of Amanda Lee and Rebecca York until 1997.

== Biography ==
Eileen Garber was born in 1949. She married Howard Buckholtz, and they had two sons, Ryan and David. She lives in Maryland, United States.

Eileen worked in the Department of Defense from 1970 to 2001.

Her first published novel was, Love is Elected as Alyssa Howard, a collaborative effort with Ruth Glick, Louise Titchener, and Carolyn Males, they wrote other novel. She continued writing Young Adult's novels with Ruth Glick, and romance novels under the pseudonyms of Amanda Lee and Rebecca York until 1997, when she decided to stop writing.

Since 1994, Eileen has been designing websites and serves as President of Technology Concepts, Inc.

== Awards ==
- 1982 - Romantic Times Nominee for Best Romance, Love is Elected
- 1987 - Romantic Times Lifetime Achievement Award for Romantic Suspense Series, The Peregrine Connection
- 1992 - Romance Writers of America RITA Award finalist for Best Romantic Suspense Novel, Bayou Moon
- 1993-1994, Romantic Times Nominee for Best Series Romance, Tangled Vows
- 1995-1996 - Romantic Times Career Achievement Award winner for Series Romantic Mystery
- 1995-1996 - Romantic Times Career Achievement Award Nominee for Series Storyteller of the Year
- 1996 - Washington Romance Writers Outstanding Achievement Award
- 1997 - Romance Writers of America RITA Award finalist for Best Romantic Suspense Novel, For Your Eyes Only

== Bibliography ==
=== As Alyssa Howard ===
==== Single romance novels ====
- Love is Elected (1982)
- Southern Persuasion (1983)

=== As Eileen Buckholtz ===
==== Twistaplot Series Multi-Author ====
10. Mission of the Secret Spy Squad (1984) (with Ruth Glick)

==== Micro Adventure Series Multi-Author ====
1. Space Attack (1984) (with Ruth Glick)
5. Mindbenders (1984) (with Ruth Glick)
7. Doom Stalker (1985) (with Ruth Glick)

==== Magic Micro Adventure Series Multi-Author ====
1. Captain Kid and the Pirates (1985) (with Ruth Glick)
4. The Cats of Castle Mountain (1985) (with Ruth Glick)

==== Charisma Inc. Series ====
1. Saber Dance (1988) (with Eileen Buckholtz)
2. Breathless (1988) (with Eileen Buckholtz and Kathryn Jensen)
3. Smoke Screen (1988) (with Eileen Buckholtz and Barbara Cummings)
4. Desperado (1988) (with Eileen Buckholtz and Chassie, L. West)
5. The Golden Hawk (1988) (with Eileen Buckholtz and Jean M. Favors)
6. On Edge (1988) (with Eileen Buckholtz)
7. Risky Venture (1989) (with Eileen Buckholtz and Alice Leonhardt)
8. Roller Coaster (1989) (with Eileen Buckholtz)
9. The Big Score (1989) (with Eileen Buckholtz and Kathryn Jensen)
10. Night Stalker (1989) (with Eileen Buckholtz and Kathryn Jensen)

==== Non-fiction ====
- Kids' Computer I.Q. Book (1983)
- ABPC: Kids´ Guide to the IBM Personal Computer (1984)

=== As Amanda Lee ===
==== Single romance novels ====
- End of Illusion (1984 May)
- Love in Good Measure (1984 Nov)
- More Than Promises (1985 Aug)
- Logical choice (1986 Mar)
- Great expectations (1987 Apr)
- A place in your heart (1988 Apr)
- Silver Creek Challenge (1989 Apr)

=== As Rebecca York ===
==== The Peregrine Connection Series ====
1. Talons of the Falcon (April 1986)
2. Flight of the Raven (August 1986)
3. In Search of the Dove (October 1986)

==== 43 Light Street Series ====
1. Life Line (August 1990)
2. Shattered Vows (February 1991)
3. Whispers in the Night (August 1991)
4. Only Skin Deep (February 1992)
5. Trial by Fire (September 1992)
6. Hopscotch (February 1993)
7. Cradle and All (July 1993)
8. What Child Is This? (December 1993)
9. Midnight Kiss (May 1994)
10. Tangled Vows (September 1994)
11. Till Death Us Do Part (April 1995)
12. Prince of Time (September 1995)
13. Face to Face (October 1996)
14. For Your Eyes Only (February 1997)
15. Father and Child (October 1997)
16. Remington and Juliet (February 1998) (in Key to My Heart)

... continued writing by Ruth Glick

==== Single romance novels ====
- Life Line (July 1990)
- Bayou Moon (May 1992)
- Tangled Vows (September 1994)

=== As Samantha Chase ===
==== Single romance novels ====
- Postmark (1988 Jul)
- Needlepoint (1989 Nov)
