= Angie Cruz =

American novelist (born 1972)

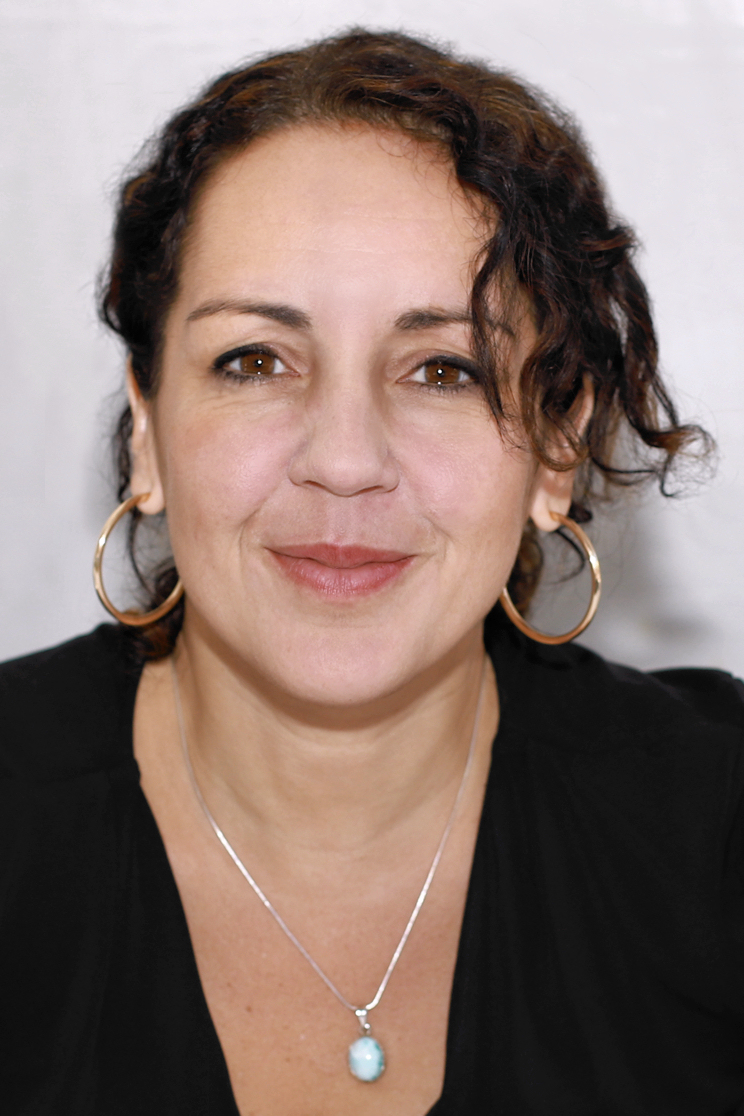
- Cruz at the 2022 Texas Book Festival
- Born: February 24, 1972 (age 54); Washington Heights, Manhattan, New York City, U.S.
- Education: SUNY Binghamton (BA); New York University (MFA)
- Occupation: Novelist
- Writing career
- Subjects: Home, gender, race, displacement, and working class life
- Notable work: Soledad "Dominicana"
- Notable awards: Alex Awards
- Website: www.angiecruz.com

Angie Cruz (born February 24, 1972) is an American novelist and associate professor at Columbia University, where she teaches in the MFA Writing Program and the Center for the Study of Ethnicity and Race. She previously taught in the MFA writing program at the University of Pittsburgh.

== Early life and education ==
Cruz was born on February 24, 1972, in Washington Heights, New York City. She is of Dominican descent, and regularly travelled from New York City to the Dominican Republic as a child.

Cruz attended Catholic school through eighth grade and grew interested in visual arts in high school. She attended LaGuardia School of the Arts and the Fashion Institute of Technology, where she studied fashion design. She received her B.A. in English from SUNY Binghamton and an M.F.A. in creative writing from New York University.

== Career ==
Cruz has written numerous books focusing on themes of home, gender, race, displacement, and working class life.

Cruz published her first novel Soledad in 2001 and her second novel, Let It Rain Coffee in 2005, both with Simon & Schuster. Her third novel, Dominicana (2019), which she published with Flatiron Books, received widespread acclaim. Publishers Weekly described the work as "Enthralling...Cruz's winning novel will linger in the reader’s mind long after the close of the story." NBC described Dominicana as "one of the most evocative and empowering immigrant stories of our time." In 2022, Cruz published her fourth novel, How Not to Drown in a Glass of Water, which was part of "100 Notable Books 2022," also with Flatiron Books.

Cruz is currently an associate professor at the University of Pittsburgh writing program and the Editor-in-Chief, she is also officially a part of the Center For African American Poetry and Poetics, and co-founder of Aster(ix) literary journal.

== Awards ==
Cruz has received numerous grants for her teaching and writing, including the Barbara Deming Award, New York Foundation for the Arts Fellowship, Camargo Fellowship, Van Lier Literary Fellowship, and NALAC Fund for the Arts Fellowship. She has also been awarded residencies: Yaddo, The Macdowell Colony, Fundacion Valparaiso, La Napoule Foundation, and The Millay Colony.

Dominicana was shortlisted for the 2020 Women's Prize for Fiction. In 2020, Dominicana received the Alex Awards.

In 2021, Cruz was awarded the Gina Berriault Award. The award is given annually to a writer who has shown a love for storytelling and a commitment to helping young writers.

In 2025, Cruz won the Dos Passos Prize and received a United States Artists Fellowship.

== Novels ==
- Soledad. Simon & Schuster. 2001. ISBN 9780743212021.
- Let It Rain Coffee. Simon & Schuster. 2005. ISBN 9780743212045.
- Dominicana. Flatiron Books. 2019. ISBN 9781250205933.
- How Not to Drown in a Glass of Water. Flatiron Books. 2022. ISBN 9781250208453.
- Angélica and la Güira. Kokila. 2024. ISBN 978-0593406014.
