= Carolyn Males =

American novelist (born 1946)

- Born: 1946 (age 79–80)
- Occupations: Writer, photographer
- Writing career
- Pen name: Alyssa Howard (with Eileen Buckholtz, Ruth Glick, Louise Titchener), Clare Richards and Clare Richmond (with Louise Titchener), Carolyn Males
- Language: English
- Period: 1982–present
- Genres: Romance, non-fiction
- Website: www.carolynmales.com

Carolyn Males (born 1946) is an American writer and photographer. She wrote romance novels in collaboration under the pseudonyms Alyssa Howard, Clare Richards and Clare Richmond from 1982 to 1993. She also collaborated in non-fiction books and her articles has appeared in Reader's Digest, Travel-Holiday, Brides, Parade, Cosmopolitan, Saturday Evening Post, Odyssey, Writer's Digest, Newsday, The Washington Post, The Baltimore Sun and other publications.

== Biography ==
Carolyn Males was born in 1946. She joined a literary critique group in Maryland. There she wrote a collaborative effort with other three women, Louise Titchener, Ruth Glick, and Eileen Buckholtz. The result was a romance novel, Love is Elected, published by Silhouette Books under the pseudonym Alyssa Howard, and they also wrote other novel, Southern Persuasion. But they decided split them into groups of two, and she collaborated with Louise Titchener under the pseudonyms of Clare Richards and Clare Richmond.

Carolyn Males lives in Clarksville, Maryland.

== Bibliography ==
=== As Alyssa Howard ===
Single romance novels

- Love is Elected (1982)
- Southern Persuasion (1983)

=== As Clare Richards ===
Single novels

- Renaissance Summer (1985 Mar)

=== As Clare Richmond ===
Single novels

- Runaway heart (1986 Nov)
- Bride's Inn (1987 Sep)
- Pirate's legacy (1990 Jul)
- Hawaiian Heat (1993 Feb)

=== As Carolyn Males ===
Non-fiction

- Life After High School (1986) (with Roberta Feigen)
- How to write & sell a column (1987) (with Julie Raskin)
- Wish You Were Here! (1999) (with Carol Barbier Rolnick and Pam Makowski Goresh)
