= Ruth Glick =

American writer (born 1942)

Ruth Day Burtnick Glick
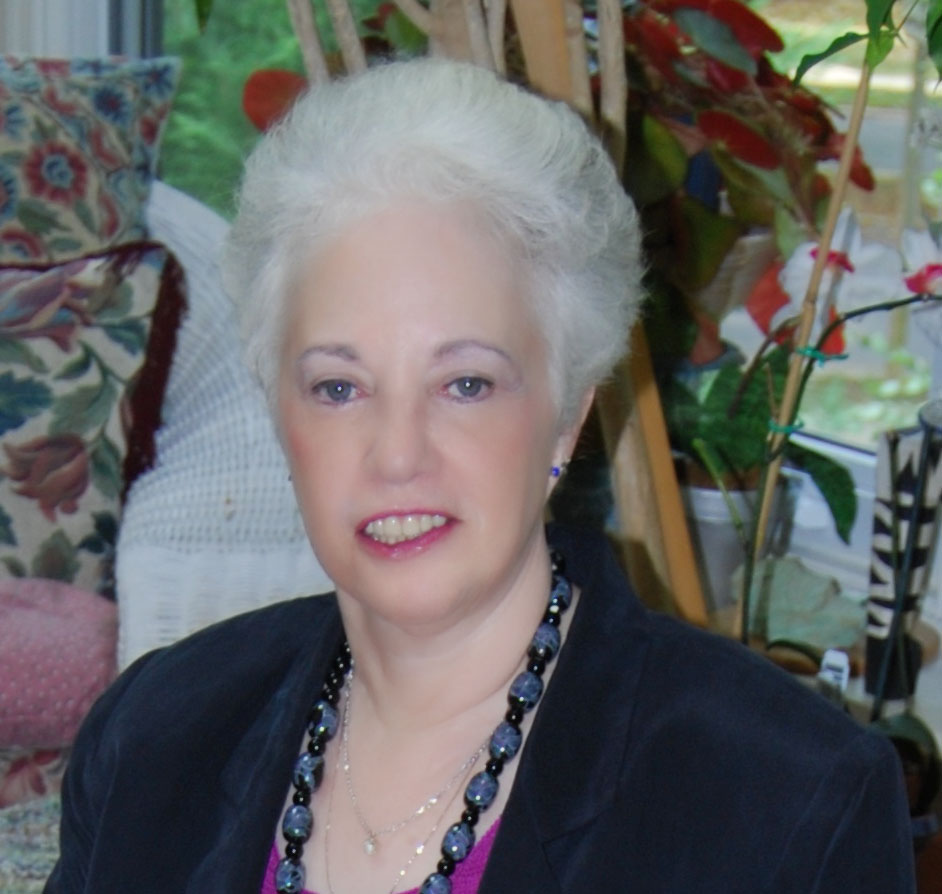
- Born: Ruth Day Burtnick; April 27, 1942 (age 84); Lexington, Kentucky, U.S.
- Education: George Washington University (BA); University of Maryland, College Park (MA)
- Occupation: Novelist
- Spouse: Norman S. Glick (m. 1963)
- Children: 2
- Writing career
- Pen name: -Ruth Glick -Amanda Lee, Samantha Chase, and Rebecca York (with Eileen Buckholtz until 1998) -Alexis Hill, Alexis Hill Jordan, and Tess Marlowe (with Louise Titchener)
- Language: English
- Genres: Romance, mystery, suspense, young adult, children
- Website: www.rebeccayork.com

Ruth Glick (née Burtnick; born April 27, 1942) is an American writer of cookbooks, romance and young adult novels. She has written novels under the pseudonym Rebecca York; until 1997 these were written in collaboration with Eileen Buckholtz.

== Biography ==
Ruth Day Burtnick was born on 27 April 1942 in Lexington, Kentucky, United States, the daughter of Lester Leon Burtnick, a psychiatrist, and Beverly Miller Burtnick, a middle-school science teacher. She was raised in Washington, D.C., she earned a B.A. in American Thought and Civilization from George Washington University and an M.A. in American Studies from the University of Maryland. On 30 June 1963, she married Norman S. Glick, a mathematician for the Defense Department. They have two children: Elissa, a librarian, and Ethan, a Foreign Service Officer.

After several years as a stay-at-home mother, Glick decided to pursue a career. She enrolled in a course at a local community college to help her choose a career. The class helped her identify a talent for writing. For the next few years, Glick wrote articles for local newspapers, and sold several articles on a freelance basis to The Washington Post and the Baltimore Sun.

In 1977, Glick published a book about making dollhouse furniture with her friend Nancy Baggett. Two years later, she published two more dollhouse books. With Baggett, Glick has written many cookbooks focusing on healthy eating; she also writes cookbooks alone. Glick sometimes hires trained chefs to test the recipes that she creates, and makes sure that every recipe is tested at least three times before it appears in one of her cookbooks.

When Glick wrote her first novel, a children's science-fiction story, it was rejected by five different publishers. The last, Scholastic, sent a two-page note detailing the flaws in the manuscript. Glick rewrote the story based on those suggestions, and Scholastic later purchased the book. It was released in 1982 as Invasion of the Blue Lights. The same year, Glick partnered with three friends, Eileen Buckholtz, Louise Titchener, and Carolyn Males to write romance novels, under the pseudonym of Alyssa Howard they published two novels, their first work "Love is Elected" was nominee for Romantic Times Best Romance. She collaborated with Buckholtz writing young-adult novels, and using with her the pseudonyms of Amanda Lee, Samantha Chase and Rebecca York, the duo wrote over 40 novels and novellas together. Most of these were romantic suspense. With Titchener, she wrote under the pseudonyms of Alexis Hill, Alexis Hill Jordan, and Tess Marlowe.

In the late 1990s, Glick decided that she no longer wished to work in collaboration, explaining that "sharing my vision with someone else stopped being satisfying for me". She and Buckholz agreed that each could release solo novels under the pseudonym Rebecca York, provided that the cover page also listed their real names. In 1998, Glick's first solo novel as Rebecca York was published as Nowhere Man.

According to Glick, as of 1999 over 5 million copies of her books were in print in 17 languages. By 2011, there were over 12 million copies of her books in print in 22 languages.

Many of her novels are published under the Harlequin Intrigue line, and in June 2003, she became one of the first authors published under Berkley's new Sensation imprint.

Glick is the head of the Columbia Writers Workshop.

== Awards ==
- 1982 – Romantic Times Nominee for Best Romance, Love is Elected
- 1987 – Romantic Times Lifetime Achievement Award for Romantic Suspense Series, The Peregrine Connection
- 1992 – Romance Writers of America RITA Award finalist for Best Romantic Suspense Novel, Bayou Moon
- 1993–1994, Romantic Times Nominee for Best Series Romance, Tangled Vows
- 1995–1996 – Romantic Times Career Achievement Award winner for Series Romantic Mystery
- 1995–1996 – Romantic Times Career Achievement Award Nominee for Series Storyteller of the Year
- 1996 – Washington Romance Writers Outstanding Achievement Award
- 1997 – Romance Writers of America RITA Award finalist for Best Romantic Suspense Novel, For Your Eyes Only
- 1998 – Romantic Times Best Intrigue Award winner, Nowhere Man
- 1998 – Affaire de Coeur's Critics Choice Award for Best Contemporary Novel, Nowhere Man
- 1999 – National Health Information Bronze Award, The Diabetes Snack Munch Nibble Nosh Book
- 2000 – Romantic Times Best Harlequin Intrigue of the Year Nominee, Amanda's Child
- 2000 – Romantic Times Career Achievement Award winner for Series Romantic Suspense
- 2001 – New Jersey Romance Writers Golden Leaf Award for Long Contemporary, Amanda's Child
- 2001 – New Jersey Romance Writers Golden Leaf Award for Best Novella, "Tyler" in Bayou Blood
- 2001 – MidAtlantic Publishers Association Finalist for Excellence in Independent Publishing Award, Fabulous Lo-Carb Cuisine
- 2002 – Daphne du Maurier Award 2nd Place for Paranormal Romantic Suspense, Never Alone
- 2003 – New Jersey Romance Writers Golden Leaf Award for Best Paranormal Romance, Killing Moon
- 2003 – Romantic Times Best Contemporary Paranormal Mainstream Novel Nominee, Killing Moon
- June 2003 – Rio Recommended Book in Romantic Suspense, Killing Moon
- 2004 – Phoenix Desert Rose Romance Writers Golden Quill Award Finalist for Best Paranormal Romance, Witching Moon
- 2004 – New Jersey Romance Writers Golden Leaf Award for Best Paranormal Romance. Witching Moon
- 2004 – Futuristic, Fantasy, and Paranormal Romance Writers of America Chapter Prism Award 2nd Place for Dark Paranormal, Witching Moon
- 2004 – Colorado Romance Writers Award of Excellence Finalist for Paranormal/Time Travel/Fantasy, Killing Moon
- 2004 – Colorado Romance Writers Award of Excellence Finalist for Paranormal/Time Travel/Fantasy, Witching Moon
- 2005 – Futuristic, Fantasy, and Paranormal Romance Writers of America Chapter Prism Award 3rd Place for Dark Paranormal, Beyond Control
- 2005 – Publishers Weekly Quill Award nominee in the Romance category for Crimson Moon
- 2005 – Washington Romance Writers Prolific Pen Award
- 2005 – Daphne du Maurier Award 2nd Place for Paranormal Romantic Suspense, Crimson Moon
- 2006 – Romantic Times Best Harlequin Intrigue of the Year, The Secret Night
- 2007 – Futuristic, Fantasy, and Paranormal Romance Writers of America Chapter Prism Award 1st Place for Novella, "Second Chance" in "Midnight Magic"
- 2008 – New Jersey Romance Writers Golden Leaf Award for Best Novella, "Huntress Moon" in "Elemental Magic"
- 2008 – Romantic Times Pioneer of Romance Award
- 2009 – Romantic Times Best Harlequin Intrigue of the Year, "More Than a Man"

== Bibliography ==
=== As Ruth Glick ===
==== Dollhouse Books ====
- Dollhouse Furniture You Can Make (1977) (with Nancy Baggett)
- Dollhouse Lamps and Chandeliers (1979) (with Nancy Baggett)
- Dollhouse Kitchen and Dining Room Accessories (1979)

==== Young adult novels ====
===== Single titles =====
- Invasion of the Blue Lights (1982), ISBN 0-590-32265-6

===== Twistaplot series multi-author =====
10. Mission of the Secret Spy Squad (1984) (with Eileen Buckholtz)

===== Micro Adventure series multi-author =====
1. Space Attack (1984) (with Eileen Buckholtz)
5. Mindbenders (1984) (with Eileen Buckholtz)
7. Doom Stalker (1985) (with Eileen Buckholtz)

===== Magic Micro Adventure series multi-author =====
1. Captain Kid and the Pirates (1985) (with Eileen Buckholtz)
4. The Cats of Castle Mountain (1985) (with Eileen Buckholtz)

===== Charisma Inc. series =====
1. Saber Dance (1988) (with Eileen Buckholtz)
2. Breathless (1988) (with Eileen Buckholtz and Kathryn Jensen)
3. Smoke Screen (1988) (with Eileen Buckholtz and Barbara Cummings)
4. Desperado (1988) (with Eileen Buckholtz and Chassie, L. West)
5. The Golden Hawk (1988) (with Eileen Buckholtz and Jean M. Favors)
6. On Edge (1988) (with Eileen Buckholtz)
7. Risky Venture (1989) (with Eileen Buckholtz and Alice Leonhardt)
8. Roller Coaster (1989) (with Eileen Buckholtz)
9. The Big Score (1989) (with Eileen Buckholtz and Kathryn Jensen)
10. Night Stalker (1989) (with Eileen Buckholtz and Kathryn Jensen)

==== Cookbooks ====
- Don't Tell 'Em It's Good for 'Em (1984) (with Nancy Baggett and Gloria Kaufer Greene)
- Eat Your Vegetables! (1985) (with Nancy Baggett and Gloria Kaufer Greene)
- Soup's On (1985) (with Nancy Baggett)
- The Oat Bran Baking Book (1989) (with Nancy Baggett)
- 100 Percent Pleasure (1994) (with Nancy Baggett)
- Skinny One-Pot Meals (1994) (with Nancy Baggett)
- Prevention's Healthy One-Dish Meals in Minutes (1995) (with Nancy Baggett)
- Skinny Italian Cooking (1996) (with Nancy Baggett)
- Skinny Soups (1997) (with Nancy Baggett)
- Your Family Will Love It! (1997)
- Simply Italian: 100 Zesty Italian Favorites Ready to Eat in Minutes (1998)
- The Diabetes Snack, Munch, Nibble, Nosh Book (1998)
- Fabulous Lo-Carb Cuisine (2000)
- One Pot Meals for People with Diabetes (2002) (with Nancy Baggett)
- Snack Attack! (2006)

==== Romance novels ====
- The Closer We Get (1989)
- Make Me a Miracle (1992)

=== As Alyssa Howard ===
==== Single romance novels ====
- Love is Elected (1982)
- Southern Persuasion (1983)

=== As Alexis Hill ===
==== Single romance novels ====
- In the Arms of Love (1983 Feb)

=== As Alexis Hill Jordan ===
==== Single romance novels ====
- Brian's Captive (1983 Aug)
- Reluctant Merger (1983 Dec)
- Summer Wine (1984 Jul)
- Beginner's Luck (1984 Dec)
- Mistaken Image (1985 Mar)
- Hopelessly Devoted (1985 Jul)
- Summer Stars (1985 Sep)
- Stolen Passions (1986 Aug)

=== As Amanda Lee ===
==== Single romance novels ====
- End of Illusion (1984 May)
- Love in Good Measure (1984 Nov)
- More Than Promises (1985 Aug)
- Logical choice (1986 Mar)
- Great expectations (1987 Apr)
- A Place in your Heart (1988 Apr)
- Silver Creek Challenge (1989 Apr)
- Worth the risk (1989 Aug)

=== As Tess Marlowe ===
==== Single romance novels ====
- Indiscreet (1988)

=== As Samantha Chase ===
==== Single romance novels ====
- Postmark (Jul 1988)
- Needlepoint (Nov 1989)

=== As Rebecca York ===
==== The Peregrine Connection series ====
1. Talons of the Falcon (April 1986)
2. Flight of the Raven (August 1986)
3. In Search of the Dove (October 1986)

==== 43 Light Street Harlequin Intrigue series ====
In collaboration with Eileen Buckholtz is indicated by *

1. Life Line (August 1990) (with Eileen Buckholtz)
2. Shattered Vows (February 1991) (with Eileen Buckholtz)
3. Whispers in the Night (August 1991) (with Eileen Buckholtz)
4. Only Skin Deep (February 1992) (with Eileen Buckholtz)
5. Trial by Fire (September 1992) (with Eileen Buckholtz)
6. Hopscotch (February 1993) (with Eileen Buckholtz)
7. Cradle and All (July 1993) (with Eileen Buckholtz)
8. What Child Is This? (December 1993) (with Eileen Buckholtz)
9. Midnight Kiss (May 1994) (with Eileen Buckholtz)
10. Tangled Vows (September 1994) (with Eileen Buckholtz)
11. Till Death Us Do Part (April 1995) (with Eileen Buckholtz)
12. Prince of Time (September 1995) (with Eileen Buckholtz)
13. Face to Face (October 1996) (with Eileen Buckholtz)
14. For Your Eyes Only (February 1997) (with Eileen Buckholtz)
15. Father and Child (October 1997) (with Eileen Buckholtz)
16. Remington and Juliet (February 1998) (with Eileen Buckholtz) also in Key to My Heart
17. Nowhere Man (July 1998)
18. Shattered Lullaby (December 1998)
19. Counterfeit Wife (August 1999) also in After Dark
20. Midnight Caller (October 1999)
21. Never Too Late (March 2000)
22. Amanda's Child (September 2000)
23. The Man from Texas (August 2001)
24. Never Alone (October 2001)
25. Lassiter's Law (December 2001)
26. From the Shadows (June 2002)
27. Phantom Lover (April 2003)
28. Intimate Strangers (July 2003)
29. Out of Nowhere (April 2004)
30. Spellbound (February 2005)
31. The Secret Night (April 2006)
32. Return of the Warrior (October 2007)
33. Soldier Caged (July 2008)
34. More Than a Man (August 2009)
35. Guarding Grace (July 2010)
36. Solid As Steele (January 2011)

==== Moon series ====
1. Killing Moon (June 2003) also in Full Moon
2. Edge of The Moon (August 2003) also in Full Moon
3. Witching Moon (October 2003) also in Moon Swept
4. Burning Moon (novella) also in Cravings
5. Crimson Moon (January 2005) also in Moon Swept
6. Shadow of the Moon (June 2006)
7. New Moon (March 2007)
8. Ghost Moon (May 2008)
9. Huntress Moon (novella) also in Elemental Magic
10. Eternal Moon (April 2009)
11. Dragon Moon (October 2009)
12. Dark Moon (Dec 2011) tie in to Decorah Security Series

==== Decorah Security series ====
1. On Edge (January 2013)
2. Dark Moon (December 2011)
3. Chained (December 2011) also in Decorah Security Collection
4. Ambushed (December 2011) also in Decorah Security Collection
5. Dark Powers (September 2012) also in Decorah Security Collection
6. Hot and Dangerous (October 2012) also in Decorah Security Collection
7. At Risk (June 2013)
8. Christmas Captive (November 2013)
9. Destination Wedding (November 2014)
10. Rx Missing (April 2015)
11. Hunting Moon (December 2015)
12. Terror Mansion (April 2016)
13. Outlaw Justice (July 2016)
14. Found Missing (September 2016)
15. Preying Game (Feb 2017)
16. Boxed In (Jun 2017)
17. Hollow Moon (Feb 2018)

==== Rockfort Security series ====
1. Bad Nights (September 2013)
2. Betrayed (July 2014)
3. Private Affair (January 2015)

===== Off World series =====
1. Hero's Welcome (Apr 2013) also in The Off World Collection
2. Nightfall (Oct 2013) also in The Off World Collection
3. Conquest (Mar 2013) also in The Off World Collection
4. Assignment Danger (Nov 2014)
5. Christmas Home (Dec 2014)
6. Firelight Confession (Nov 2015)

===== Chronicles of Arandal series =====
1. Dark Magic (Aug 2011)
2. Shattered Magic (Aug 2011)
3. Desperate Magic (Jul 2013)

==== Dark paranormal romantic suspense ====
- Beyond Control (August 2005)
- Chain Reaction (October 2006)
- Beyond Fearless (December 2007)
- Christmas Spirit (October 2008)
- Powerhouse (February 2010)
- Day of the Dragon (Dec 2010)
- Dark Warrior (Sep 2011)

==== Other Harlequin intrigues ====
- Life Line (Jul 1990)
- Bayou Moon (May 1992)
- Tangled Vows (Sep 1994)
- Body Contact (Mar 2002)
- Bedroom Therapy (Jan 2004)
- Undercover Encounter (Jul 2004)
- Spellbound (Feb 2005)
- Riley's Retribution (Dec 2005)
- Royal Lockdown (Jun 2007)
- Sudden Attraction (Feb 2012)
- Sudden Insight (Jan 2012)
- Her Baby’s Father (Sep 2012)
- Carrie’s Protector (Jun 2013)
- Bridal Jeopardy (Mar 2014)
- Diagnosis: Attraction (Apr 2014)

==== Anthologies and collections ====
| Anthology or Collection | Contents | Publication Date | With |
|---|---|---|---|
| Key to My Heart | Remington and Juliet | Jan 1998 | Muriel Jensen, Kasey Michaels |
| Escapade | | Dec 1998 | Margot Early, Lynne Graham, Vicki Lewis Thompson |
| After Dark | Counterfeit Wife | Jul 1999 | Caroline Burnes |
| Secret Vows | | Jan 2000 | Kelsey Roberts |
| Bayou Blood Brothers | | Mar 2001 | Metsy Hingle, Joanna Wayne |
| Part of the Bargain / Undercover / Free Fall / Bayou Moon / Trail by Fire | | Mar 2002 | Jasmine Cresswell, Linda Lael Miller |
| Intimate Danger: Tempting Faith / Shattered Vows | | Sep 2002 | Susan Mallery |
| Gypsy Magic: Allessandra / Sabina / Andrei | | Oct 2002 | Ann Voss Peterson, Patricia Rosemoor |
| Dark Secrets: Whispers in the Night / Only Skin Deep / Trail by Fire | | Dec 2002 | |
| Silent Night: What Child is This? / Better Watch Out | | 2003 | Dani Sinclair |
| Witchcraft | | Mar 2003 | Jayne Ann Krentz and Amanda Stevens |
| Guarded Secrets | | Sep 2003 | B J Daniels |
| Boys in Blue: Jordan/Liam/Zachary | | Dec 2003 | Ann Voss Peterson and Patricia Rosemoor |
| Silk and Magic: Book One | Dangerous Seduction | Apr 2004 | |
| Cravings | Burning Moon | Jun 2004 | Mary Janice Davidson, Laurell K. Hamilton and Eileen Wilks |
| Immortal Bad Boys | Night Ecstasy | Sep 2004 | Rosemary Laurey and Linda Thomas-Sundstrom |
| The Journey Home | Hero’s Welcome | Jan 2005 | |
| Desert Sons | Luke’s Story | Apr 2005 | Ann Voss Peterson and Patricia Rosemoor |
| What Dreams May Come | Shattered Dreams | Jul 2005 | Sherrilyn Kenyon and Robin D Owens |
| Totally Charmed | A Stake in the Future | Nov 2005 | |
| Full Moon | Killing Moon Edge of the Moon | Feb 2006 | |
| Moon Swept | Witching Moon Crimson Moon | Nov 2006 | |
| Midnight Magic | Second Chance | May 2006 | Susan Kearney and Jeanie London |
| Unleashed | Bond of Silver | Dec 2006 | Susan Kearney, Lucy Monroe and Diane Whiteside |
| Elemental Magic | Huntress Moon | Nov 2007 | Carol Berg, Jean Johnson and Sharon Shinn |
| The Mammoth Book of Vampire Romance | The Sacrifice | Aug 2008 | |
| Christmas Spirit / Christmas Awakening | | Oct 2008 | Ann Voss Peterson |
| Immortal Bad Boys | Night Ecstasy | Sep 2010 | |
| The Mammoth Book of Hot Romance | Afternoon in Paradise | Jul 2011 | |
| Decorah Security Collection | Chained Ambushed Dark Powers Hot and Dangerous | Dec 2012 | |
| The Off World Collection | Hero's Welcome Nightfall Conquest | Mar 2014 | |
