= National Redress Scheme =

The National Redress Scheme (NRS) was established in 2018 by the Australian Government as a result of a recommendation by the Royal Commission into Institutional Responses to Child Sexual Abuse. It aims to offer redress to survivors via three elements:

- a monetary payment to survivors as a tangible means of recognising the wrong survivors have suffered; and
- a counselling and psychological component which, depending on where the survivor lives, consists of access to counselling and psychological services or a monetary payment; and
- a direct personal response to survivors from the participating institutions and partly‑participating institutions responsible.

The Royal Commission into Institutional Responses to Child Sexual Abuse estimated that some 60,000 survivors may be eligible.

== Procedure and amount of redress payment ==
Survivors of institutional child sexual abuse can apply for redress by calling the NRS to request an application form be posted to their nominated address or they can create a myGov account to complete the form on-line. The applicant is required to fill-in details of the assault, the assailant(s), and the institution(s). A further one-and-a-half-page space is allotted to “describe the impact of sexual abuse across your life”. The process does not involve face-to-face assessment meetings.

This application is assessed using the "reasonable likelihood" as its burden of proof, a lower burden of proof when compared to a civil case in a court of law which requires a "balance of probabilities", which is much harder to prove.

If an application is accepted, then the amount of a redress payment is calculated by an Independent Decision Maker under an Assessment Framework that sets out the maximum amounts for components of redress as follows:

Amount of redress payment
	Column 1 Kind of sexual abuse of the person	Column 2 Recognition of sexual abuse	Column 3 Recognition of impact of sexual abuse	Column 4 Recognition of related non‑sexual abuse	Column 5 Recognition person was institutionally vulnerable	Column 6 Recognition of extreme circumstances of sexual abuse
1	Penetrative abuse	$70,000	$20,000	$5,000	$5,000	$50,000
2	Contact abuse	$30,000	$10,000	$5,000	$5,000	Nil
3	Exposure abuse	$5,000	$5,000	$5,000	$5,000	Nil

== Participating institutions ==
Where child sexual abuse is identified by the Scheme Operator as having occurred in an institution it is approached to participate in the Scheme. Applicants are able to search for participating institutions on the NRS website.

By late February, 2019, many institutions had still not joined the scheme. In response, the Department of Social Services released a list of 100 institutions that had not signed up.

=== Catholic Church participation ===
The Australian Catholic Bishops Conference (ACBC) formed a company called Australian Catholic Redress Limited (ACRL) in 2018. This was done on behalf of the 35 Archdioceses, Dioceses, Eparchies and Ordinariates that covers the vast proportion of Australian Catholics. The ACRL joined the National Redress Scheme in 2018.

The ACBC also encouraged the various Institutes of Clerical Religious (Priests or Priests and Brothers) the Institutes of Religious Brothers, Institutes of Religious Women, Institutes of Consecrated Life, Societies of Apostolic Life, Associations of Christ’s Faithful, and the Ministerial Public Juridic Persons who are separate entities to ACRL to also join the National Redress Scheme. Those that had involvement with young people have generally joined the scheme.

== Non Participating institutions ==
As of May, 2021, the government Commission lists these 8 institutions as declining to participate:

- Fairbridge Society
- Gold Coast Family Support Group (now FSG Australia)
- Hunter Aboriginal Children’s Services (HACS)
- RG Dance Pty Ltd
- Yeshiva Centre and the Yeshiva College Bondi – pre 2003
- Yeshivah Centre Melbourne (Chabad Institutions of Victoria Ltd.)*
- Mordialloc Sailing Club

Note: * indicates They have stated that they intend to participate at some time in the future.

== Criticism ==
The NRS has attracted criticism from abuse survivors, survivor advocate groups, lawyers, representatives of the Anglican Church, and politicians. Much of this criticism has focused on the assessment matrix used by the scheme to calculate compensation. Whereas the Royal Commission's recommended matrix was based on a 100 point system - 40 points for the abuse severity, 40 for impact, and 20 for institutional factors - to determine payments up to a maximum of $200 000, the Guardian reported that the maximum payout of $150,000 was only possible in extreme circumstances involving sexual abuse with penetration.

For those survivors who suffered non-penetrative sexual abuse (which may include oral sex), the maximum payout under the scheme is $50 000, regardless of the number of times they were abused, the number of institutions in which they were abused, or the impact of the abuse. Tasmania's Anglican Bishop, Richard Condie commented the way the assessment matrix is designed would limit payouts. Lawyer, Judy Courtin also described the matrix unfair and not an evidence-based policy. Courtin explained in a separate article that the matrix limits payouts for those who were not sexually penetrated to $50,000, even when in the presence of extenuating circumstances. By comparison, Rebel Wilson was awarded $650,000 by the Victorian supreme court for "hurt and distress" in a defamation case against magazine company Bauer Media.

The ABC reported that details of the NRS matrix were not made public until after the bill had passed both houses of Parliament. Bishop Condie said the Anglican Church tried unsuccessfully to get the Federal Government to make changes to the matrix.

In The Sydney Morning Herald, survivor and barrister James Miller insisted for changes to the existing version of the matrix, which he claimed ran contrary to the Royal Commission recommendation for assessment to be calculated according to severity and impact.

=== Response to criticism ===
The Catholic Church in Australia supported limiting maximum compensation to $150,000, which faced criticism from the legal profession. The Catholic Weekly responded, stating that although this is fair criticism towards the church, they would have followed through with $200,000 payouts if the government did as well, but they believe the government did not due to concerns about funding availability. In response to critics saying that the church only joined the scheme because it reduces their legal liability and is believed to be financially cheaper than having the church being sued for damages in court, the article claims that the burden of proof is also higher for litigation in court compared to the requirements of the NRS.
