= List of American print journalists =

This is a list of selected American print journalists, including some of the more notable figures of 20th-century newspaper and magazine journalism.

== 19th-century print journalists ==
- M. E. C. Bates (1839–1905) – writer, journalist, newspaper editor; co-organizer/president of the Michigan Woman's Press Association; associate editor of the Grand Traverse Herald; writer for the Evening Record and the Detroit Tribune; oldest, continuous, newspaper correspondent in Michigan
- Mary Temple Bayard (pen name, "Meg"; 1853–1916) – writer, journalist
- Philip Alexander Bell (1808–1886) – abolitionist; founder and editor of The Colored American, The Pacific Appeal, and The San Francisco Elevator
- Lettie S. Bigelow (1849–1906) – "Aunt Dorothy" letters at True Light
- Anna Braden (1858–1939) – editor, Presbyterian Visitor
- Mary Towne Burt (1842–1898) – newspaper publisher and editor of Our Union, the organ of the Woman's Christian Temperance Union
- Elizabeth Cameron (editor) (1851–1929) – magazine editor
- Anna Maria Mead Chalmers (1809–1891) – children's literature writer and journalist
- Emma Shaw Colcleugh (1846–1940) – newspaper book reviewer (The Providence Journal) and contributor (Boston Evening Transcript)
- Alma Carrie Cummings (1857–1926) – journalist; newspaper editor and proprietor (Colebrook, New Hampshire, News and Sentinel)
- Susan E. Dickinson (1842–1915) – Civil War correspondent, noted for her articles about the coal mining industry, suffrage, and women's rights
- Louise E. Francis (1869–1932) – journalist; newspaper editor, publisher, proprietor (Castroville Enterprise,)
- Barbara Galpin (1855–1922) – journalist; affiliated for 25 years with the Somerville Journal, serving as compositor, proof reader, cashier, editor woman's page and assistant manager
- William Lloyd Garrison (1805–1809) – editor of the abolitionist newspaper The Liberator
- Horace Greeley (1811–1872) – newspaper editor, founder of the New York Tribune, reformer, politician, opponent of slavery
- Eliza Trask Hill (1840–1908) – activist, journalist, philanthropist; founder, editor, Woman's Voice and Public School Champion, an organ of the Protestant Independent Women Voters
- Florence Huntley (1855–1912) – journalist and editor, St. Paul Pioneer Press, Minneapolis Tribune, The Washington Post
- Claudia Quigley Murphy (1863–1941) – journalist, economic consultant, advisory counsel, author
- Thomas Nast (1840–1902) – German-born American caricaturist and editorial cartoonist' the scourge of Boss Tweed and the Tammany Hall machine' considered to be the "father of the American cartoon"
- John Neal (1793–1876) – fiction author; critic; magazine and newspaper essayist and editor; founder of The Yankee; America's first daily newspaper columnist
- Alice Hobbins Porter (1854–1926) – British-born American journalist, correspondent, editor
- Rebecca N. Porter (1883–1963) – educator, author, journalist
- Mary Virginia Proctor (1854–1927) – editor, Lebanon Patriot
- Esther Pugh (1834–1908) – editor and publisher of Our Union, the organ of the Woman's Christian Temperance Union
- Anna Rankin Riggs (1835–1908) – founder, editor, Oregon White Ribbon, official organ of the Oregon WCTU
- Anne Royall (1769–1854) – first female journalist in the United States; first woman to interview a president; publisher and editor for Paul Pry (1831–1836) and The Huntress (1836–54) in Washington, D.C.
- Rowena Granice Steele (1824–1901) – performer, author, newspaper journalist, editor, publisher; contributor to The Golden Era, co-founder of The Pioneer , assistant editor of the San Joaquin Valley Argus, editor and proprietor of the Budget
- Susie Forrest Swift (1862–1916) – editor of All the World, Catholic World, and Young Catholic
- Henry James Ten Eyck (1856–1887) – editor of Albany Evening Journal
- Lydia H. Tilton (1839–1915) – newspaper correspondent
- Madge Morris Wagner (1862–1924) – journalist, poet; editor of The Golden Era
- Rosa Kershaw Walker (1840s–1909) – society section journalist of St. Louis Post-Dispatch and St. Louis Globe-Democrat; proprietor and editor of Fashion and Fancy
- Jeannette H. Walworth (pen names, "Mother Goose" and "Ann Atom"; 1835–1918) – American journalist, novelist; contributor to The Continent and The Commercial Appeal
- Ida B. Wells (1862–1931) – investigative journalist and reformer, noted for investigating lynching in the United States
- Rosa Louise Woodberry (1869–1932) – journalist, educator; on staff with The Augusta Chronicle and the Savannah Press
- Caroline M. Clark Woodward (1840–1924) – temperance newspaper writer

== 19th-century and 20th-century print journalists ==
- Grace Alexander (1872–1951), society editor, Indianapolis News
- Arthur William à Beckett (1844–1909) – English journalist and intellectual
- Ambrose Bierce (1842–1914?) – editor, columnist, and journalist
- Marion Howard Brazier (1850–1935) – journalist, editor, author, and clubwoman; society editor of The Boston Post (1890–98) and The Boston Journal (1903–1911); edited and published the Patriotic Review (1898–1900)
- Adda Burch (1869–1929) – Pennsylvania State reporter to The Union Signal
- Mamie Claflin (1867–1929) – publisher, St. Paul Phonograph; editor, Ord Journal; editor and publisher, The Union Worker
- Richard Harding Davis (1864–1916) – first American correspondent to cover the Spanish–American War (1898), Second Boer War (1899–1902), Russo-Japanese War (1904–1905) and the 1914–16 stages of World War I
- Mary G. Charlton Edholm (1854–1935) – reformer, journalist; World's Superintendent of press work, Woman's Christian Temperance Union; secretary for the International Federation Women's Press League; contributor, New York World, the Chicago Tribune, St. Louis Post-Dispatch, Republican, Chicago Inter Ocean, The Union Signal, the New York Voice, Woman's Journal, The Woman's Tribune, and the California Illustrated Magazine; editor, The Christian Home
- Jessie Forsyth (1847/49–1937) – temperance advocate; editor of The Temperance Brotherhood, The Massachusetts Templar, International Good Templar, and The Dawn
- Ella M. George (1850–1938) – contributor, Christian Statesman; editor, Pennsylvania W.C.T.U. Bulletin
- Jeannette Leonard Gilder (pen name, "Brunswick"; 1849–1916) – author, journalist, critic, editor; regular correspondent and literary critic, Chicago Tribune; correspondent, Boston Saturday Evening Gazette, Boston Transcript, Philadelphia Record and Press; owner and editor, The Reader: An Illustrated Monthly Magazine; Newark reporter, New York Tribune; editorial department, Morning Register; literary editor, Scribner's Monthly; drama and music critic, New York Herald; co-founder, The Critic
- Eva Kinney Griffith (1852–1918) – journalist, temperance activist, novelist, newspaper editor, journal publisher; contributor, Temperance Banner, The Union Signal, and Woman's News; publisher, True Ideal; special writer, Daily News Record; society editor, Chicago Times
- Kate E. Griswold (1860–1923) – editor, publisher, and proprietor of Profitable Advertising
- Corinne Stocker Horton (1871–1947) – newspaper editor (The Atlanta Journal); journalist
- Sarah Huston (1848–1926) – columnist; newspaper editor and publisher, The Home Alliance
- Maria I. Johnston (1835–1921) – reporter, correspondent, writer and/or editor at the St. Louis Globe-Democrat, St. Louis Spectator, New Orleans Picayune, New Orleans Times-Democrat, and Boston Woman's Journal
- Lillian A. Lewis (1861–?) – first African-American woman journalist in Boston
- Martha D. Lincoln (1838–?; pen name, "Bessie Beech") – American author and journalist; co-founder, Woman's National Press Association
- Muriel Irwin MacDonald (1867–1918), journalist, editor of Los Angeles Times, The Craftsman, The Delineator, Housewives' League Magazine, The Forecast Magazine, New-York Tribune
- Estelle M. H. Merrill (pen name, "Jean Kincaid"; 1858–1908) – journalist, editor; charter member of the New England Woman's Press Association, contributor to the Boston Transcript, staff on The Boston Globe, co-editor of American Motherhood,
- S. Isadore Miner (1863–1916; pen name, "Pauline Periwinkle") – journalist, poet, teacher, feminist; first corresponding secretary of the Michigan Woman's Press Association; staff member of Good Health; founder, editor of the "Woman's Century" page of The Dallas Morning News
- Annie L. Y. Orff (1861–1914) – American journalist; magazine editor and publisher
- Robert Percival Porter (1852–1917) – British-born American journalist, editor, statistician; co-founder of the New York Press
- Effie Hoffman Rogers (1853/55–1918) – editor-in-chief and publisher of the P.E.O. Record
- Grace Carew Sheldon (1855–1921) – journalist, author, editor, businesswoman; staff and special correspondent of the Buffalo Courier; department editor of the Buffalo Times
- Jennie O. Starkey (ca. 1856 – 1918) – journalist and editor, Detroit Free Press; charter member, Michigan Woman's Press Association; president, Michigan Woman's Press Club; board of directors, Michigan Authors' Association
- Jane Agnes Stewart (1860–1944) – author, newspaper editor
- Marion Foster Washburne (1863–1944)- journalist, author, newspaper/magazine editor, lecturer, educator
- Sallie Joy White (1847–1909) – journalist
- Alice Willard (1860–1936) – journalist, editor
- Ella B. Ensor Wilson (1838–1913) – founder, proprietor, editor of the Wilsonton Journal

== 20th-century print journalists ==
- Al Abrams (1904–1977) – sportswriter, columnist and editor for the Pittsburgh Post-Gazette
- Jack Anderson (1922–2005) – syndicated political columnist
- Paul Y. Anderson (1893–1938) – investigative journalist, winner of Pulitzer Prize 1929
- Hannah Arendt (1906–1975) – known for book on Eichmann trial
- Russell Baker (1925–2019) – newspaper and magazine essayist
- Jeanne Bellamy (1911–2004) – reporter and first female member of the editorial board for the Miami Herald
- Robert Benchley (1889–1945) – newspaper and magazine humorist
- Marilyn Berger (born 1935) – diplomatic correspondent, Washington Post
- Carl Bernstein (born 1944) – investigative journalist, Washington Post
- Les Biederman (1907–1981) – sportswriter, columnist and editor for Pittsburgh Press
- Edna Lee Booker – foreign correspondent in China during the 1930s and 1940s
- Croswell Bowen (1905–1971) – reporter for PM Magazine and The New Yorker during the 1940s and 1950s
- Ben Bradlee (1921–2014) – editor of the Washington Post at the time of the Watergate scandal
- Jimmy Breslin (1930–2017) – New York columnist
- Eve Brodlique (1867–1949) – Chicago columnist, editor
- Heywood Broun (1888–1939) – columnist and guild organizer
- Helen Gurley Brown (1922–2012) – editor of Cosmopolitan magazine
- Colleen Dishon (1924–2004) – first woman listed in the Chicago Tribune masthead
- Art Buchwald (1925–2007) – syndicated columnist and humorist
- William F. Buckley, Jr. (1925–2008) – founder and editor of The National Review
- Herb Caen (1916–1997) – San Francisco columnist
- C. P. Connolly (1863–1935) – radical investigative journalist associated for many years with Collier's Weekly
- Harriet L. Cramer (1847–1922) – newspaper editor and publisher, The Evening Wisconsin
- Linda Deutsch (born 1943) – American Associated Press court journalist
- Edna Marie Dunn (1893–1983) – fashion illustrator The Kansas City Star
- Roger Ebert (1942–2013) – Pulitzer Prize-winning Chicago film critic
- Margaret Dye Ellis (1845–1925) – correspondent, The Union Signal
- Victor Eubank (1883–1955) – wrote the Associated Press's lead financial story every day for 15 years
- Mary Fels (1863–1953) – editor of The Public: A Journal of Democracy
- Carol Lee Flinders (born ?) – Laurel's Kitchen syndicated columnist
- Jack Fuller (1946–2016) – editor and publisher of the Chicago Tribune
- Martha Gellhorn (1908–1998) – war correspondent
- Vera Glaser (1916–2008) – journalist and feminist
- Bob Greene (born 1947) – journalist
- Frances Nimmo Greene (1867–1937) – editor, woman's page of The Birmingham News
- Ruth Gruber (1911–2016) – journalist
- Emily Hahn (1905–1997) – wrote extensively on China
- David Halberstam (1934–2007) – foreign correspondent, political and sport journalist
- Arnold Hano (1922–2021) – freelance journalist, book editor, biographer and novelist
- Seymour Hersh (born 1937) – investigative journalist and political writer
- Hugh Hefner (1926–2017) – founder and editor of Playboy
- Hedda Hopper (1885–1966) – syndicated gossip columnist
- Molly Ivins (1944–2007) – Texas-based syndicated columnist
- Dorothy Misener Jurney (1909–2002) – influential journalist covering women's issues on women's pages
- Pauline Kael (1919–2001) – film critic for The New Yorker
- K. Connie Kang (1942–2019) – first female Korean American journalist, wrote for Los Angeles Times
- James J. Kilpatrick (1920–2010) – syndicated political columnist
- Irv Kupcinet (1912–2003) – syndicated columnist for the Chicago Sun-Times
- Helen Langworthy (1899 –1991) – journalist, short story writer, and theater director in Colorado
- Ring Lardner (1885–1933) – sportswriter and short-story writer
- Margaret Burr Leonard (1942–2022) – journalist and civil rights activist
- Frances Lewine (1921–2008) – Associated Press White House correspondent; president of the Women's National Press Club
- A. J. Liebling (1904–1963) – journalist closely associated with The New Yorker
- Walter Lippmann (1889–1974) – Washington, D.C. political columnist
- Della Campbell MacLeod (ca. 1884–1921) – author, journalist
- Eva Anne Madden (1863–1958) – educator, journalist, playwright, author
- Ray Marcano – medical reporter and music critic
- Ralph G. Martin (1920–2013) – combat correspondent for Armed Forces newspaper Stars and Stripes and Army weekly magazine Yank; wrote for Newsweek and The New Republic
- George McElroy (1922–2006) – first black reporter for the Houston Post and first minority columnist of any newspaper in Houston
- H. L. Mencken (1880–1956) – essayist, critic, and editor of The Baltimore Sun
- Ruth Montgomery (1912–2001) – first female reporter in the Washington bureau of the New York Daily News; president of the Women's National Press Club
- Jim Murray (1919–1998) – Los Angeles sports columnist
- Eldora Marie Bolyard Nuzum (1926–2004) – first female editor of a daily newspaper in West Virginia, journalist, interviewer of U.S. presidents
- Robert Palmer (1945–1997) – first full-time chief pop music critic for The New York Times, Rolling Stone contributing editor
- Louella Parsons (1881–1972) – syndicated gossip columnist
- Drew Pearson (1897–1969) – Washington political columnist
- George Plimpton (1927–2003) – magazine journalist and editor of Paris Review
- Shirley Povich (1905–1998) – sportswriter for The Washington Post
- Ernie Pyle (1900–1945) – Pulitzer Prize-winning war correspondent
- Patricia Raybon – published in The New York Times Magazine, Newsweek, USA Today and Chicago Tribune
- James ("Scotty") Reston (1909–1995) – political commentator for the New York Times
- Grantland Rice (1880–1954) – sportswriter
- Mike Royko (1932–1997) – Pulitzer Prize-winning Chicago columnist
- Damon Runyon (1880–1941) – newspaper journalist and essayist
- Harrison Salisbury (1908–1993) – first regular New York Times correspondent in Moscow after World War II
- E. W. Scripps (1854–1926) – founder of the Scripps-Howard newspaper chain
- George Seldes (1890–1995) – journalist, editor and publisher of In Fact
- Randy Shilts (1951–1994) – reporter for The Advocate and San Francisco Chronicle
- Hugh Sidey (1927–2005) – political writer for Life and Time magazines
- Roger Simon (1948–) – journalist and author
- Agnes Smedley (1892–1950) – journalist and writer known for her chronicling of the Chinese Communist Revolution
- Drue Smith (died 2001) – print and broadcast journalist
- Red Smith (1905–1982) – New York sports columnist
- Edgar Snow (1905–1972) – journalist and writer, chronicled the Chinese Communist Revolution, especially in Red Star Over China
- I.F. Stone (1907–1989) – investigative journalist, publisher of I.F. Stone's Weekly
- Anna Louise Strong (1885–1970) – pro-communist journalist and writer
- Helen Thomas (1920–2013) – White House correspondent for United Press International
- Dorothy Thompson (1893–1961) – journalist and radio broadcaster. In 1939 she was recognized by Time magazine as the second most influential woman in America after Eleanor Roosevelt. Regarded as the "First Lady of American Journalism."
- Hunter S. Thompson (1937–2005) – creator of Gonzo journalism
- Ruth Vassos (1890s–1965) – fashion writer and editor
- Theodore White (1915–1986) – reporter for Time magazine in China, 1939–1944, author of Making of the President
- Margaret Hicks Williams (1899–1972) – newspaper and magazine feature writer
- Anne Elizabeth Wilson (1901–1946) – editorial positions at Canadian Homes & Gardens, Mayfair, Chatelaine, Hodder & Stoughton Ltd., Musson Book Company, Maclean's
- Earl Wilson (1907–1987) – syndicated gossip columnist
- Walter Winchell (1897–1972) – columnist and radio broadcaster
- Charles A. Windle (1866–1934) – anti-prohibitionist, editor of Iconoclast
- Bob Woodward (born 1943) – investigative journalist, Washington Post
- Alexander Woollcott (1887–1943) – New York drama critic

== 21st-century print journalists ==
- Cecilia Ballí (born 1974), covers Mexican border
- Santo Biasatti
- Katya Cengel
- Nelson Castro
- Ron Chernow
- Charles Duhigg
- Jens Erik Gould
- Lloyd Grove – gossip columnist for the New York Daily News
- Maria Hall-Brown
- David Harsanyi – editor, National Review
- Oliver Holt
- Gwen Ifill
- Mike Jones
- Mary Jordan (journalist)
- Avery Yale Kamila – Vegan Kitchen columnist for the Portland Press Herald /Maine Sunday Telegram
- Nicholas Kristof
- Jorge Lanata
- John Leland
- Joshua Lyon
- Steve Mirsky – columnist for Scientific American
- Eric Olander
- María Laura Santillán
- Eric Schlosser
- Somini Sengupta
- Paul Spencer Sochaczewski – writer, writing coach, conservationist and communications advisor to international non-governmental organizations
- Jackie Summers – food writer
- Kaitlyn Vincie
- David Warsh – Gerald Loeb Award–winning journalist; published in both print and non-print media
- Amy Westervelt (born 1978)
- Tom Wilber
- Brian Williams
- Paige Williams (author)
- Kathy Y. Wilson
- Joe Yonan – food and dining editor and weeknight vegetarian columnist for The Washington Post
- Andi Zeisler

== See also ==
- American Journalism Historians Association
- History of American newspapers
- History of journalism
- Illinois Woman's Press Association
- Irish American journalism
- Lists of journalists
- Media bias in the United States
- National Federation of Press Women
