= Chalmers (surname) =

Chalmers is a Scottish surname. Notable people with this surname include:

- Alan Chalmers (born 1939), British philosopher of science
- Alexander Chalmers (1759–1834), Scottish writer
- Alexander Chalmers (mayor) (1645–1703), Scottish-Polish merchant, jurist, and city clerk
- Andrew Chalmers (actor) (born 1992), Canadian actor
- Andrew Chalmers (footballer) (1899-?), Scottish footballer
- Andrew Chalmers (rugby league), New Zealand businessman and rugby player
- Angela Chalmers (born 1963), Canadian middle-distance athlete
- Anna Maria Mead Chalmers (1809–1891), American journalist
- Brett Chalmers (born 1973), Australian footballer
- Bruce Chalmers (1907–1990), American metallurgist
- Christopher Chalmers (born 1967), Canadian swimmer
- Craig Chalmers (born 1968), Scottish rugby player
- David Chalmers (born 1966), Australian philosopher and cognitive scientist
- Fiona Chalmers, British actress
- Floyd Chalmers (1898–1993), Canadian editor, publisher and philanthropist
- George Chalmers (antiquarian) (1742–1825), Scottish antiquarian
- George Paul Chalmers (1833–1878), Scottish painter
- George Chalmers (baseball) (1888–1960), American baseball player
- Greg Chalmers (born 1973), Australian golfer
- Hamilton Henderson Chalmers (1833–1885), American jurist from Mississippi
- Iain Chalmers (born 1943), British health services researcher
- Jackie Chalmers (1884–1947), Scottish footballer
- James Chalmers (actor) (born 1974), British actor
- James Chalmers (inventor) (1782–1853), Scottish inventor of the adhesive postage stamp
- James Chalmers (missionary) (1841–1901), Scottish missionary
- James Ronald Chalmers (1831–1898), American politician
- James Chalmers (loyalist) (died 1806), Scottish-born loyalist officer during the American Revolution
- Jim Chalmers (born 1978), Australian politician
- Jim Chalmers (New South Wales politician) (1901–1986), Australian politician from New South Wales
- Jimmy Chalmers (1877–1915), Scottish footballer
- Joan Chalmers (1928–2016), Canadian philanthropist
- John George Chalmers (1874–1962), American football coach
- Joseph W. Chalmers (1806–1853), American politician from Mississippi
- Judith Chalmers (1935–2026), English television presenter
- Kyle Chalmers (born 1998), Australian swimmer
- Len Chalmers (1936–2014), British football player
- Lewis Chalmers (born 1986), British football player
- Lionel Chalmers (born 1980), American basketball player
- Logan Chalmers (born 2000), Scottish footballer
- Sir Mackenzie Chalmers (1847–1927), British civil servant, judge, pioneer legislative draftsman
- Mario Chalmers (born 1986), American basketball player
- Nathanael Chalmers (1830–1910), Scottish-born pastoralist, explorer, politician mainly of New Zealand
- Patrick R. Chalmers (1872–1942), Irish writer
- Paul Chalmers (born 1963), Scottish footballer
- Stevie Chalmers (1936–2019), Scottish footballer
- Robert Chalmers (1858–1938), British official, Permanent Secretary to the Treasury, Governor of Ceylon; Pali scholar
- Robert Stanley Raymond Chalmers (1919–1942), Australian soldier who was killed in the Ration Truck massacre
- Thomas Chalmers (1780–1847), scholar, theologian, leader of the Free Church of Scotland
- Thomas Chalmers (rugby player) (1850–1926), Scottish rugby player
- Thomas C. Chalmers (1917–1995), American medical researcher
- Thomas Hardie Chalmers (1884–1966), American actor and opera singer
- Walter Chalmers (1873–1957), British locomotive engineer
- William Chalmers (merchant) (1748–1811), Swedish century businessman and founder of Chalmers University of Technology

== Fictional characters ==
- Superintendent Chalmers, school administrator on The Simpsons
- Detective Chalmers, Intra Solar System Police officer on Cowboy Bebop
- Walter Chalmers, politician in Bullitt
- Ed Chalmers, District Attorney in Blonde Ice
- Mr. Chalmers (alias Mr. Caslon), in You Gotta Stay Happy
- Otey Chalmers, in She Couldn't Say No (re-released as Beautiful But Dangerous)
- Polly Chalmers, in Stephen King's Needful Things

== See also ==
- Chalmers (disambiguation)
