= Mary Winearls Porter =

British crystallographer and mineralogist (1886–1980)

Mary "Polly" Winearls Porter
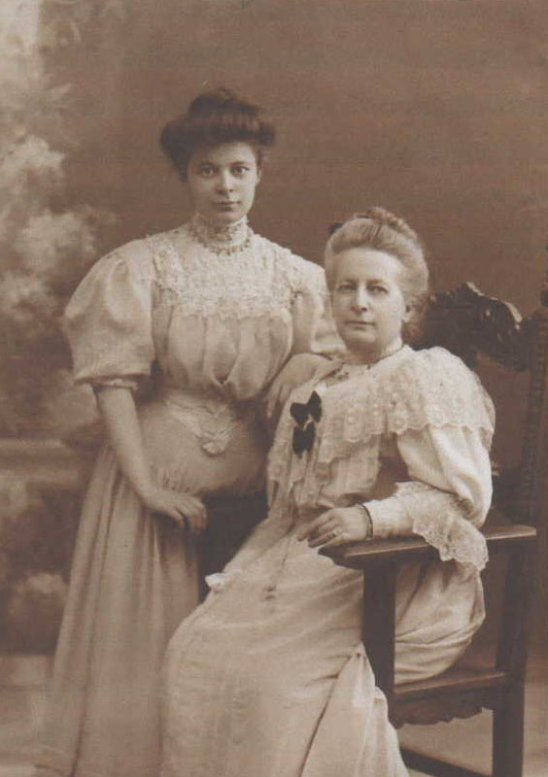
- Mary Winearls Porter (left) with her mother
- Born: 26 July 1886; King's Lynn, Norfolk
- Died: 25 November 1980 (aged 94); Oxford, England
- Known for: What Rome Was Built With: A Description of the Stones Employed in Ancient Times for its Building
- Scientific career
- Fields: Crystallography · geology

Mary "Polly" Winearls Porter (26 July 1886 – 25 November 1980) was an English crystallographer and geologist, known for her contributions to the English crystallography field and publications about ancient Roman architecture. She was one of the first people who studied the application of stones in cultural heritage as a legacy of physical artifacts, and intangible attributes inherited from past generations. Porter's extensive knowledge and contribution to her research can be said to have transformed this area of study into an established field of cross-disciplinary research.

== Personal life ==
Mary "Polly" Winearls Porter was born in King's Lynn, Norfolk, London in 1886. Born to Robert Percival Porter, an international journalist for The Times, and Alice Hobbins Porter, also a journalist. Mary enjoyed the typical childhood of a young girl at that time. Her father did not believe in formal education for women but she was taught reading and writing.

During her teen years, her family had moved to Rome for her father's work and required a long stay in the city due to her mother becoming ill. While in Rome Porter began to collect Roman artifacts and developed her interest into ancient Roman architecture and society. Porter became increasingly interested in the works of Giacomo Boni, a Roman architect along with archaeologists in Rome. However, upon finding out that only few archaeologists could give her accurate information to help identify different kinds of marbles, she decided to tackle this issue herself. The guides used by archaeologists at that time differed in knowledge and Porter saw the need to create a book that would become an ultimate guide to the stones of Rome. Fueled by her ambition and enthusiasm of youth Porter began to seriously study marble. Teaching herself, Porter developed a rudimentary understanding of the basic of geology and continued to research the various Roman architecture and stones until her family moved back to England. Her brothers were impressed with her potential and suggested to their parents that she should be given a formal education; they refused.

After returning to England, Porter became fascinated by the Corsi collection of antique marbles in the Oxford Museum. Here she met Henry Miers, a Professor of Crystallography at the University of Oxford, who was impressed by her frequent visits and passion for crystallography. He tasked her with translating the Corsi Collection from Italian to English. He introduced Porter to Alfred Tutton who gave her a job in his lab.

Porter then had to move with her family to the United States then later to Germany following her father's job. She worked in museums throughout these years. She ended up back in Britain where she stayed, working at Somerville College, Oxford.

Following her retirement, Porter continued to be active within Somerville, often participating in the college's fundraisers and events. Porter died in 1980 at 94 years old.

== Education ==
Mary's father, Robert Porter, found that education was unnecessary for woman. Therefore, she received a basic education, but she never obtained a formal education during her childhood. Despite not attending school, a young Mary Porter became self-taught in the field of geology to gain a better understanding of the decorative stones that had once caught her eye. Porter now had the geological knowledge to organize the classes of decorative stones that at one point had only the mere color or texture attributed to them as their names. The self-taught geologist continued to study decorative stones and their importance and function in Roman architecture, leading up to her many publications on the subject, under the guidance of Henry Miers. Her success was only made when her mentor, Henry Miers, tutored her personally and urged Porter to go to university. It was not until 1918, eleven years after Porter published her first book, without having taken any courses, that she earned her Bachelor of Science from Oxford. Her certificate was based on having completed two years of academic research under Thomas Barker, a professor in science. Porter had also spent short periods of time researching at the Ludwig-Maximilians-Universität München and Heidelberg University for two years to that she was also awarded a Doctor of Science from Oxford for her contributions to crystallography.

In 1918, eleven years after Porter published her first book, she earned her Bachelor of Science from the University of Oxford.

== Early career ==
Porter's career first began at the Oxford University Museum of Natural History, where she translated various pieces of the Corsi Collection. She translated it, reclassified the entire collection and prepared a complete catalogue. As she began to study Corsi Collection at the University of Oxford she started to work on her own book, obtaining material first-hand while studying the collections during her visits throughout Europe. With correspondence to William Brindley, co-director of Farmer & Brindley, an ancient stone collector and contractor, and her access to the ancient stone catalog at the museum, Porter was able to publish her first book, What Rome was Built With: A Description of the Stones Employed in Ancient Times for its Building and Decoration in 1907. She was 21 at the time she published the book, and she had no academic qualifications at the time. Porter's book is concluded with two-indexes containing more than 115 entries and a list of works of reference. As a result of the success of her book What Rome was Built With: A Description of the Stones Employed in Ancient Times for its Building and Decoration and labor at the University of Oxford, Porter began to receive offers from other museums abroad to classify and catalogue their collections of minerals and marbles.

Porter later traveled to Washington, D.C., with her family. While in America, Porter worked at the National Museum in Washington cataloguing the mineral collection now known as the Smithsonian. Thereafter she returned to Europe to work on the Mineralogical State Collection in Munich now in her mid- twenties. During the summer of 1913, Porter returned to the US to work with pioneering geologist Florence Bascom at Bryn Mawr College. Florence Bascom was one of the leading American woman geologists of that time and also became a close friend of Porter during her life.

== Later career ==
Porter's later work came to revolve around the completion of the Barker Crystallographic. The purpose of this index was to gather a thorough database for crystallo-chemical analysis. It started with Porter helping Thomas Barker, a lecturer in crystallography at the University of Oxford, with finishing the index with aid from Reginald Spiller as well. When Barker died in 1931, Porter and Spiller continued the work and published volume one in 1951. The second volume was published in 1956, and after the death of Spiller in 1954, Porter published the third volume with a new co-author, L W Codd. In total the three volumes contained data on 7300 crystalline substances. Although Porter had never actually received credit for the work she had done with Codd.

Porter went on to be an influential crystallographer. She encouraged other female researchers like Dorothy Hodgkin a pioneering female x-ray crystallographer and 1964 Nobel laureate in chemistry, who she mentored and worked with. Porter continued her research in crystallography well throughout her life, until the year 1959. During these years, Porter was a member of the Somerville College Council from 1937 to 1947. In 1948, Porter continued to make contributions to the Corsi Collection at Oxford when she became a fellow of Somerville. This was where she would carry out her research until her death in 1980. She was also a council member for the Mineralogical Society of Great Britain from 1918 to 1921, 1929 to 1932 and a fellow of the Mineralogical Society of America from 1921 to 1927.

Porter was at the forefront of emerging crystallography technologies, quickly embracing and contributing to the new era of X-ray crystallography. She was involved in publishing a number of research articles concerning X-Ray crystallography in journals such as Mineralogical Magazine, American Mineralogist, Proceedings of the Royal Society, Nature and Acta Crystallographica and continued to make contributions to the Corsi Collection at Oxford.

== Major publications ==
She was quick to observe the lack of knowledge surrounding the stones within digs and began to record and research the stones herself at the age of 15. After being tasked with translating the Corsi Collection Porter's expertise in her field grew, and she was able to publish her book, What Rome was Built With: A Description of the Stones Employed in Ancient Times for its Building and Decoration (1907), which is still relevant in today's geological studies.

However, the authenticity of Porter's work was often questioned at the time of the publication of her books, regarding the lack of basis for various statements and revisions. The most critical review of her book highlights the need to check facts represented by Porter by authorities in the field. Specifically, critics accentuate that there isn't an authority for Bruzza's assertion on which Porter bases her statement, that the columns of the original basilica were of marble at all.

At the same time, Porter's book found supporters like Henry Frowd who praised Porter for providing detailed descriptions of stones and their history, as well as tracing their places of origin. Henry Frowd notes that Carrara marble industry is one of the most interesting sections written by Porter and that the book itself describes not only the stones of Rome, but the ancient quarries from which they came. Overall, What Rome was Built With: A Description of the Stones Employed in Ancient Times for its Building and Decoration is considered to be a good material that is in need of revisions.

Some of her other most notable publications were "Ancient Marbles used in Modern Times". She is also known as being a co-editor of the Barker Index of Crystals among many other publications.

== Legacy ==
Although her work on publications such as The Barker Index did not provide to be very useful as better methods of crystal analysis were created soon after, Porter's contributions to science and geology in a male dominated field helped pave the way for future female x-ray crystallographers.
