= Chalmers =

Chalmers may refer to:

== People ==
- Chalmers (surname), a Scottish surname
- Thomas Chalmers, Scottish minister, theologian and political economist
- Chalmers Tschappat, American football player
- David Chalmers, Australian philosopher
- Mario Chalmers, American basketball player

== Places ==
=== United States ===
- Chalmers, Indiana, a town
- Chalmers Institute, a historic building in Holly Springs, Mississippi

=== New Zealand ===
- Port Chalmers, in Dunedin
- Port Chalmers (New Zealand electorate), a former New Zealand parliamentary electorate

== Organizations ==
- Allis-Chalmers, a manufacturing company
- Chalmers Automobile, a former U.S. car company
- Chalmers University of Technology, Gothenburg, Sweden
