= Emily Thornton Charles =

American journalist

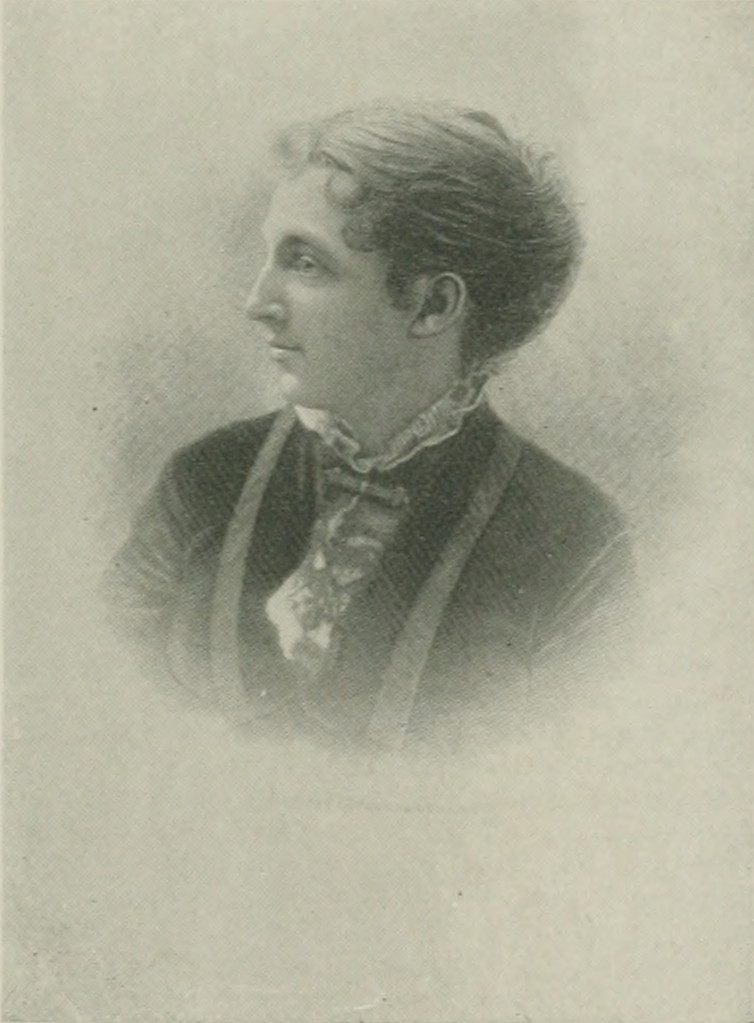
- Photo in A Woman of the Century"
- Born: Emily Thornton; March 21, 1845; Lafayette, Indiana, U.S.
- Died: April 25, 1895 (aged 50); Washington, D.C., U.S.
- Resting place: Rock Creek Cemetery; Washington, D.C., U.S.
- Occupations: Poet; journalist; newspaper founder
- Spouse: Daniel B. Charles (m. 1861; died 1869)
- Writing career
- Pen name: Emily Hawthorne
- Notable works: Hawthorne Blossoms (1876); Lyrical Poems, Songs, Pastorals, War Poems, and Madrigals (1886)

Emily Thornton Charles (née, Thornton; pen name, Emily Hawthorne; March 21, 1845 – April 25, 1895) was a 19th-century American poet, journalist, editor, and newspaper founder. Married in 1861 and widowed eight years later, she was left with two children to support. In 1874, she began a successful career as a journalist, at first a correspondent and reporter for various newspapers, and later as editor. She was the associate editor of the book entitled Eminent men of Indiana. In 1881, she became managing editor of the Washington World and was the founder, manager, and editor of the National Veteran at Washington, D.C. She was actively identified with the National Woman Suffrage Convention, the Woman's National Press Association, and the Society of American Authors. Her published writings, under the pseudonym "Emily Hawthorne," include Hawthorne Blossoms (1876), and Lyrical Poems, Songs, Pastorals, War Poems, and Madrigals (1886). Charles favored women's Suffrage.

== Early life and family ==
Emily Thornton was born in Lafayette, Indiana, on March 21, 1845. She comes from English ancestors, the Thorntons and Parkers. On the paternal side, the Thorntons were noted as original thinkers. Her great-grandfather, Elisha Thornton, carried a sword in the American Revolutionary War. Her grandfather, also Elisha Thornton, resident of Sodus, New York, served in the War of 1812. Her father, James M. Thornton, served in the Union Army and died during the American Civil War in 1864, and of her two brothers, Charles lost his life in the Civil War, and Gardner served in Harrison's regiment. The Parkers, her maternal ancestors, were among the early Puritans. Deacon Edmund Parker settled in Reading, Massachusetts, about 1719, the family removing thereafter to Pepperell, Massachusetts, which town they helped to found. For more than a century, from father to son, the Parkers were deacons and leaders of the choir in the Congregational Church. When Emily's grandfather married, the couple took a wedding journey in a sleigh to find a new home in Lyons, New York, taking with them their household goods. Twenty years later, their daughter, Harriet Parker, was married to James M. Thornton, a civil engineer, son of Elisha. The young couple moved to Lafayette, where Mr. Thornton established a large manufactory.

Emily Thornton was educated in the free schools of Indianapolis. As a child in school, she attracted attention by the excellence of her written exercises and her original manner of handling given subjects.

== Career ==
At the age of 16, she became a teacher. She married, in 1861, Daniel B. Charles, son of a businessman long established in Indianapolis. At the age of 24, she was left a widow, in delicate health, with two young children dependent upon her.

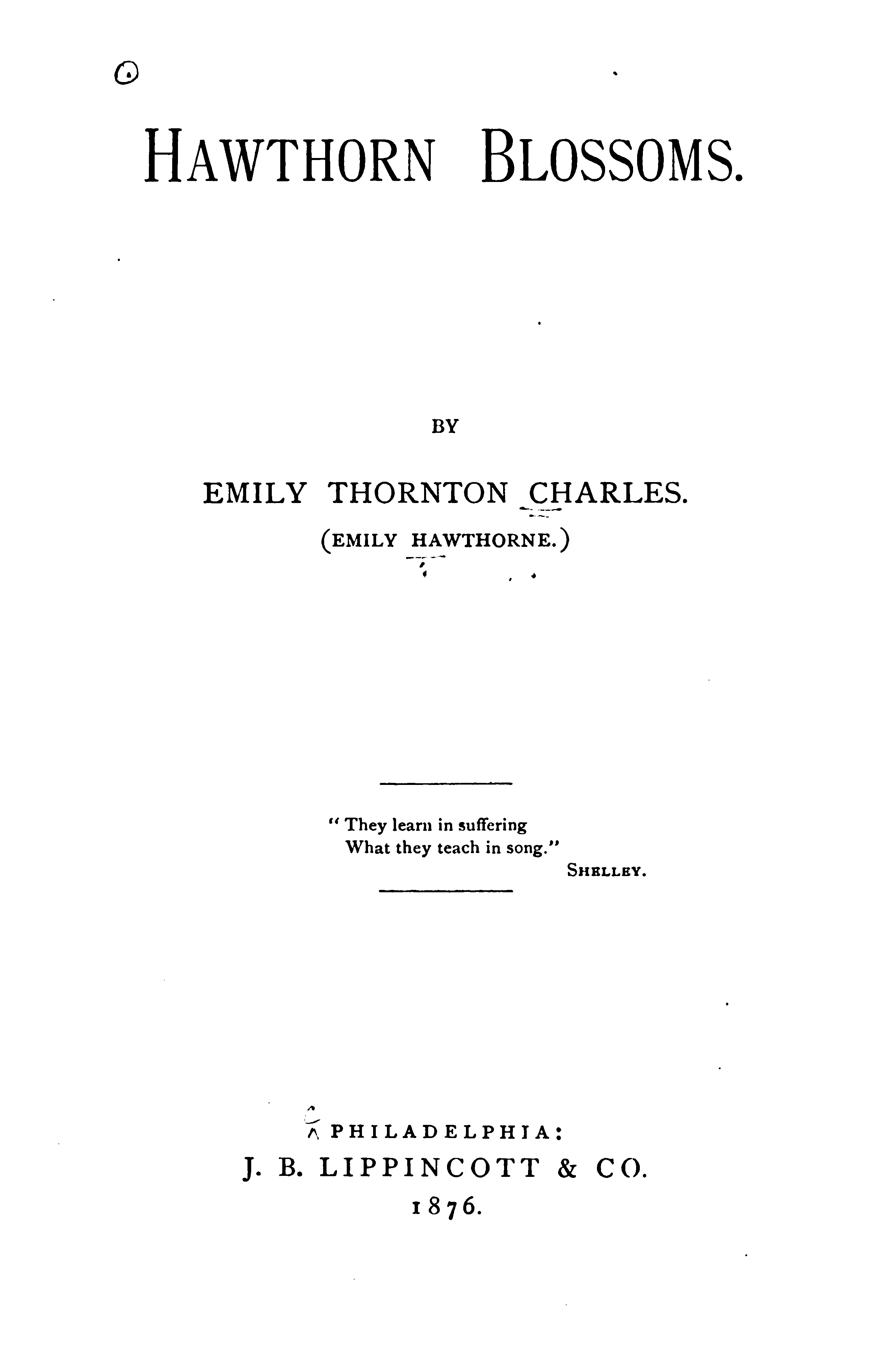
Hawthorn Blossoms (1876)

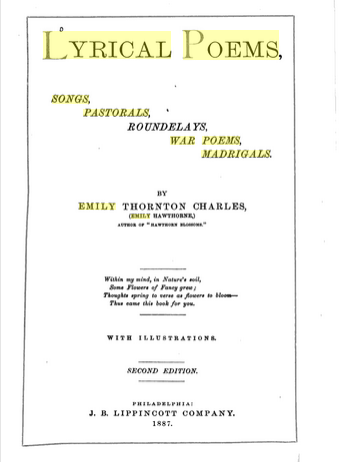
Lyrical Poems, Songs, Pastorals, Roundelays, War Poems, Madrigals (1887)

In 1874, Charles began to write for a livelihood, doing reporting and editorial work for Indianapolis papers and correspondence for outside publications. In 1876, she published her first volume of verse under the title Hawthorn Blossoms (Philadelphia). This book was received well and proved a literary and financial success. From 1876 to 1880, she continued to do newspaper work and biographical writing. She was associate editor of Eminent Men of Indiana. In 1881, she accepted a position as managing editor of the Washington World. Afterwards, she established The National Veteran in Washington, D. C., of which she was sole proprietor and editor.

In 1883, because of overwork, Charles was confined to her bed for an entire year. While recovering slowly, she spent the year in revising and preparing for publication her later poems. The work appeared in Lyrical Poems, Songs, Pastorals, War Poems, and Madrigals (Philadelphia, 1886), a volume of 300 pages. That volume fully established her reputation as a national poet. She was a member of the executive committee of the National Woman's Press Association and chairman of the executive council of the Society of American Authors. Charles wrote almost exclusively under the name of "Emily Thornton", though "Emily Hawthorne" was also used.

She appeared upon the lecture platform with success. On the occasion of her departure from Indiana, when a complimentary farewell testimonial was tendered her by the leading citizens of Indianapolis in 1880, she made a brilliant address. In 1882, she addressed an audience of 1,500 ex-prisoners of war in Cincinnati, Ohio. Her poetical address on "Woman's Sphere" was delivered before a National Woman's Suffrage Convention. She was selected as one of the speakers at the World's Columbian Exposition in 1893. She died in Washington City, where the latter part of her life was spent.

== Death ==
She died April 25, 1895, in Washington, D.C., and was buried in Rock Creek Cemetery.

== Selected works ==
- Hawthorn blossoms (1876)
- Lyrical poems, songs, pastorals, roundelays, war poems, madrigals. (1886)
