= Alice Hobbins Porter =

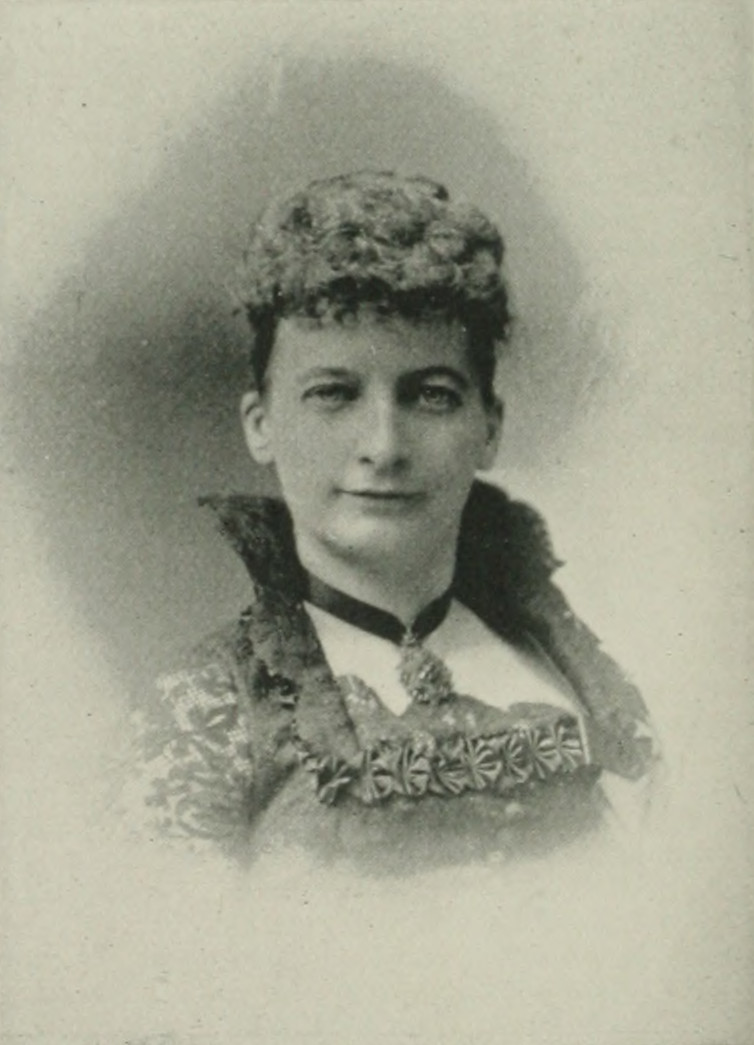
- "A Woman of the Century"
- Born: Alice Russell Hobbins; 9 February 1854; Staffordshire, England
- Died: 1926 (aged 71–72)
- Occupations: journalist; correspondent; editor; syndicalist
- Spouse: Robert Percival Porter (m. 1884; died 1917)
- Children: Mary Winearls Porter
- Writing career
- Pen name: Cress

Alice Hobbins Porter (née, Hobbins; pen name, Cress; 9 February 1854 – 1926) was a British-born American journalist, correspondent, editor, and syndicalist. She was a correspondent, contributor, editor, or staff member for a number of different publications including: the Milwaukee Journal Sentinel, Cincinnati Enquirer, Chicago Times, Wisconsin State Journal, Chicago Inter Ocean, New York Daily Graphic, New York Sun, New York Herald, New York World, Harper's Magazine, Spirit of the Times, The Philadelphia Press, National Tribune, and the New York Press.

== Early life ==
Alice Russell Hobbins was born in Staffordshire, England on 9 February 1854. She was a daughter of Joseph Hobbins, M. D., Fellow of the Royal College of Physicians and Surgeons, and of Sarah Badger Jackson, a native of Newton, Massachusetts. Hobbins' mothers family had included several prominent people in the history of the United States including Gen. Michael Jackson of the American Revolutionary War, and Jonathan Russell, who was a prominent diplomat.

Joseph Hobbins arrived in Madison, Wisconsin with his family in 1854, and it is here that Alice's early life was spent.

== Career ==
In 1877, she went to Chicago and made her first venture in journalism as correspondent for the Milwaukee Journal Sentinel and The Cincinnati Enquirer, contributing frequently to the Chicago Times and News, and to the Wisconsin State Journal. She became a member of the Chicago Inter Ocean staff and was promoted successively to religious editor, dramatic editor, and finally, as writer of special articles.

In 1879, she went to New York City as correspondent for several western newspapers, and while there, was regularly on the staff of the New York Daily Graphic, and a frequent contributor to the New York Sun, and occasionally to the New York Herald and New York World. She contributed to Harper's Magazine and Bradstreet's. She wrote the prize sketch in a Christmas number of the Spirit of the Times, which was entirely made up of contributions from the eight best-known women correspondents of the U.S. Up to the time of her marriage, she wrote principally under the pen name "Cress".

Porter visited Europe twice as correspondent for her work, and after her March 7, 1884 marriage to Robert Percival Porter (1852-1917), journalist and statistician. She accompanied him on his industrial investigations abroad. She wrote a series of letters for a syndicate, embracing thirty of the principal journals of the country, and special letters to the New York World, The Philadelphia Press, National Tribune, and other papers, most of which were reprinted in England.

When Mr. Porter founded the New York Press, in 1887, Mrs. Porter joined the editorial staff and contributed special articles, which attracted widespread attention. She edited Mr. Porter's letters and essays on the condition of the working classes abroad.

During Mr. Porter's residence in Washington, D.C. as Superintendent of the Census (1889–1893), Mrs. Porter was occupied with family responsibilities and social obligations. During that time, she wrote in support of working women, educational projects, and children.

She assumed the editorship of a paper in eastern Tennessee.

== Personal life ==
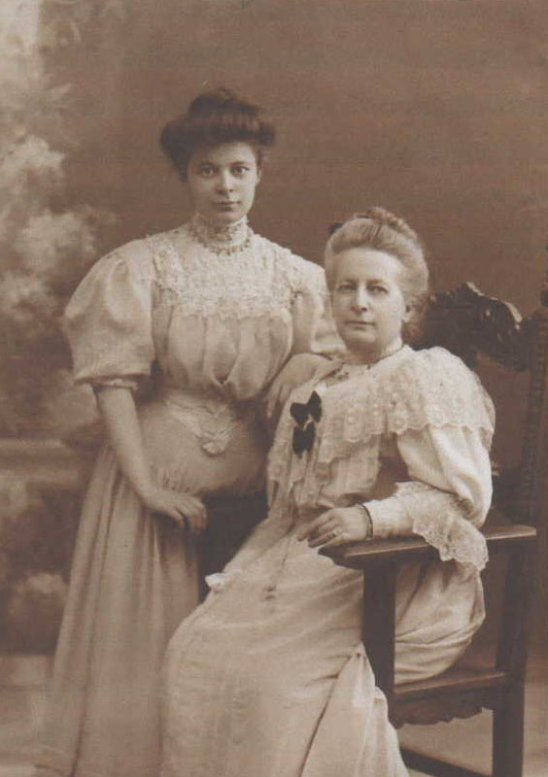
"Polly" Porter with her mother, Alice Hobbins Porter (l-r), ca. 1910

The Porters' had a daughter, Mary ("Polly") Winearls Porter (1886–1980). During Mary's teen years, the family moved to Rome for her father's work and required a long stay in the city due to her mother becoming ill.

Alice Russell Hobbins Porter died in 1926.
