= Edna Marie Dunn =

American fashion designer (1893–1983)

- Born: April 18, 1893; Chicago, Illinois
- Died: June 20, 1983 (aged 90); Lee's Summit, Missouri
- Known for: fashion designer, fashion illustrator

Edna Marie Dunn (April 18, 1893–June 20, 1983) was an American fashion illustrator and designer whose designs appeared in The Kansas City Star. She founded the Edna Marie Dunn School of Fashion in 1937 and the Kansas City Fashion Group.

== Early life ==
Dunn was born on April 18, 1893, in Chicago, Illinois. Dunn's father was a doctor, who in his free time sketched and painted. In turn, Dunn began sketching clothes at age six and was sewing designs she created by age 15. She attended Westport High School in Kansas City, Missouri.

== Education ==
Dunn, being interested in fashion illustration, went on to study at Christian College, now known as Columbia College, and the Chicago Academy of Fine Arts.

== Career ==
After graduating from Chicago Academy of Fine Arts, Dunn went on to open a studio in Kansas City. Being the era before photographs were used to advertise clothes, she was sketching clothing ads for stores like Harzfeld's, S. Rothschild's, Woolf Brothers, and Emery, Bird, Thayer.

Dunn won a competition for a position as an illustrator for The Kansas City Star in 1922. She worked with Nell Snead, the fashion editor of the newspaper. Single sketches of hers would be included in the appear on weekdays, and on Sundays would have multiple illustrations. Dunn worked for The Kansas City Star until 1965 and never missed a deadline. Her illustrations are still available in the Star's digital archives. Along with her illustrations she published quilt patterns with other artists such as Eveline Foland, Ruby Short McKim, and other anonymous submitters.

In 1937 Dunn opened the Edna Marie Dunn School of fashion in downtown Kansas City. The location eventually moved to her childhood home at 3820 Main St. She taught for 33 years about all aspects of clothing, fashion illustration, and how to construct garments. Her students consisted of men and women, some post World War II students, who used G. I. tuition funds for their education. They used this information to train for jobs in Kansas City's garment business.

To house her growing business, Dunn built a sizeable studio in front of her home. She also illustrated a line of holiday cards sold across the country.

Dunn was a co-founder with Fanny Fern Fitzwater of a Kansas City group for apparel professionals named The Fashion Group in 1946. The group was dedicated to promoting Kansas City's fashion industry and the artisits involved with it. She would hold exhibitions for commercial artists and fashion designers at her personal studio and local galleries. Dunn was heavily involved in the Kansas City fashion community, along with Fanny Fern Fitzwater, Nell Snead, and Patricia George.

Dunn retired in 1969 and continued to do freelance work for the next 10 years.

== Personal life ==
Dunn married Frank E. Douglass on May 16, 1925, a real estate developer. He would help Dunn run the storefront on Main Street. Dunn, privately, went by Mrs. Frank Douglass, but retained her maiden name professionally.

Dunn was active in alumnae community of Christian College. Dunn presided over a local chapter of Gamma Alpha Chi, a nation-wide advertising sorority. She was also a member of Zonta International, which only accepted one woman and one man from each profession.

== Death ==
Dunn died June 20, 1983, in Lee's Summit, Missouri.
