= Ella M. S. Marble =

American journalist, educator, activist, and physician

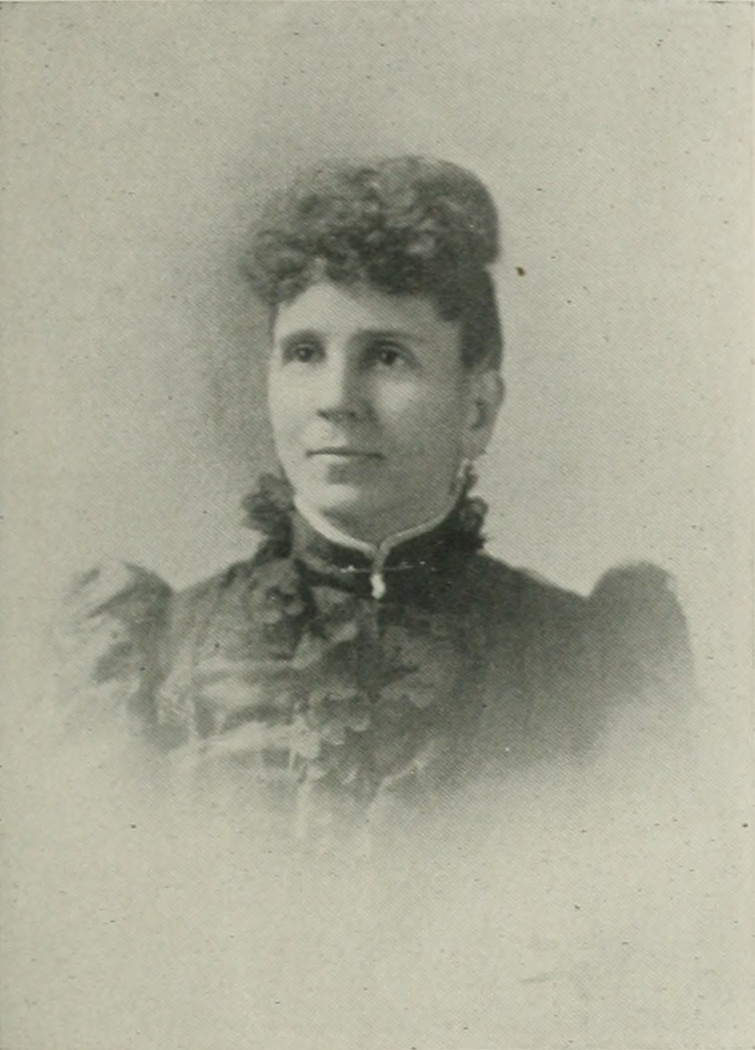
- Photo in A Woman of the Century
- Born: Ella Marie Smith; August 10, 1850; Gorham, Maine, U.S.
- Died: 1929 (aged 78–79); Paris, Maine, U.S.
- Education: Gorham Academy
- Occupations: physician, journalist, educator, activist
- Spouses: Elmer Halsey Marble (m. 1870); Rev. Oluf Tandberg (m. 1901)

Ella M. S. Marble (née Smith; after first marriage, Marble; after second marriage, Tandberg; August 10, 1850 – 1929) was an American physician who worked as a journalist, educator, and activist earlier in her career.

Interested in literary and philanthropic work, Marble served as president of the District of Columbia Federation Womans' Clubs, numbering ten societies and 2,500 members ("Pro Re Noto", Woman's National Press Association, Woman's Relief Corps, 20th Century Club of the Unitarian Church, Ladies' Auxiliary Board of Emergency Hospital, Sons and Daughters of Maine, and the District Womans' Suffrage Association). She served as president, District Federal; vice-president, Womans' National Press Association for the state of Maine; president, Minnesota State Suffrage Association; president, Minneapolis City Suffrage Association; president, Washington City Suffrage Association; Secretary, Pro Re Noto; and secretary, White Cross Society of Minneapolis. During these years Marble was a public lecturer on philanthropic and educational topics and a member of the editorial staff of a Washington daily paper. She established the first gymnasium for women and children in Washington, D. C, in 1890. After raising a family and becoming a grandmother, Marble graduated in medicine.

== Early life and education ==
Ella Marie Smith was born in Gorham, Maine, August 10, 1850, the daughter of Stevens Smith and Sophia Ann Chadbourne. The mother died when Marble was nine years of age. She was her father's housekeeper from the age of 12 until she was 17. Living a rugged, healthful life during her girlhood days, Marble was educated in the common schools of her native town, and having completed that course, made her way through the village seminary and the Gorham Academy.

From girlhood, she took an active interest in any movement calculated to advance the interests of women.

== Career ==
An aptitude for study fitted her for teaching, and she taught and attended school alternately until she married, in 1870. Losing none of her interest in educational matters, she joined the Society for the Encouragement of Study at Home, conducted by a number of educated Cambridge, Massachusetts women, supplementing her studies by contributions to the leading papers and magazines of Maine and Massachusetts. In 1873, she accepted the editorial management of the juvenile department of a Maine paper. Failing health put a stop to her literary work for a time, and in search of health she moved to the West, spending five years in Kansas and Minnesota, devoting herself almost exclusively to philanthropic and educational work. She held at one time the offices of president of the Minnesota State Suffrage Association, president of the Minneapolis Suffrage Association, seven offices in the Woman's Christian Temperance Union and secretary of the White Cross movement. She was also secretary and director of a maternity hospital, which she did much toward starting. She was one of the founders of the immense Woman's Christian Temperance Union Coffee Palace in Minneapolis. Receiving, in 1888, a flattering offer from a Washington, D.C., daily newspaper, she moved to the capital to take a position upon the editorial staff. She contributed also Washington letters to eastern and western papers. Notable literary work appeared in Kansas, Minneapolis, Boston, and Portland, Maine.

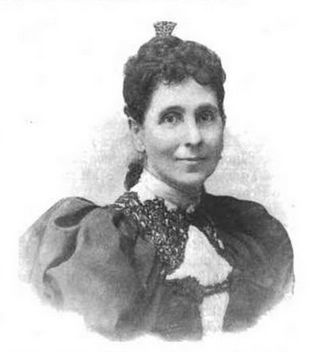
Ella M. S. Marble

Failing health caused her to abandon all literary work and engage in something more active, and she turned her attention to physical culture for women. She established, in 1889, the first women's gymnasium ever opened in Washington, D.C. She also established in connection with it an emporium for healthful dress, and found great pleasure in the fact that she had surrounded herself with two hundred fifty women and children who, as teachers, pupils and sewing-girls, were all looking to her to guide them toward health. In 1890, and again in 1891, she was made president of the District of Columbia Woman's Suffrage Association. She was several times called by the national officers to address the committees of the House and Senate. As a public speaker she was elective. Her wide experience in philanthropic work caused her to be called frequently to fill pulpits of both orthodox and liberal churches. In 1891, having made her school of physical culture a social and financial success, she sold it and accepted the financial agency of Wimodaughsis, the national woman's club.

In Washington in 1890, Marble began medical school, matriculating at the National University, where she received three courses of lectures, graduating with honors in 1895 and at once beginning practice. She gave an address on "Women in Medicine" at the Atlanta Exposition.

== Personal life ==
In 1870, she married Elmer Halsey Marble (1846–1893) of Paris, Maine. There were two children from this marriage, Fred Jarvis Marble and Alice Chadbourne Marble. In 1901, she married Rev. Oluf Tandberg. She died in 1929, in Paris, Maine.
