= Henry James Ten Eyck =

American journalist (1856–1887)

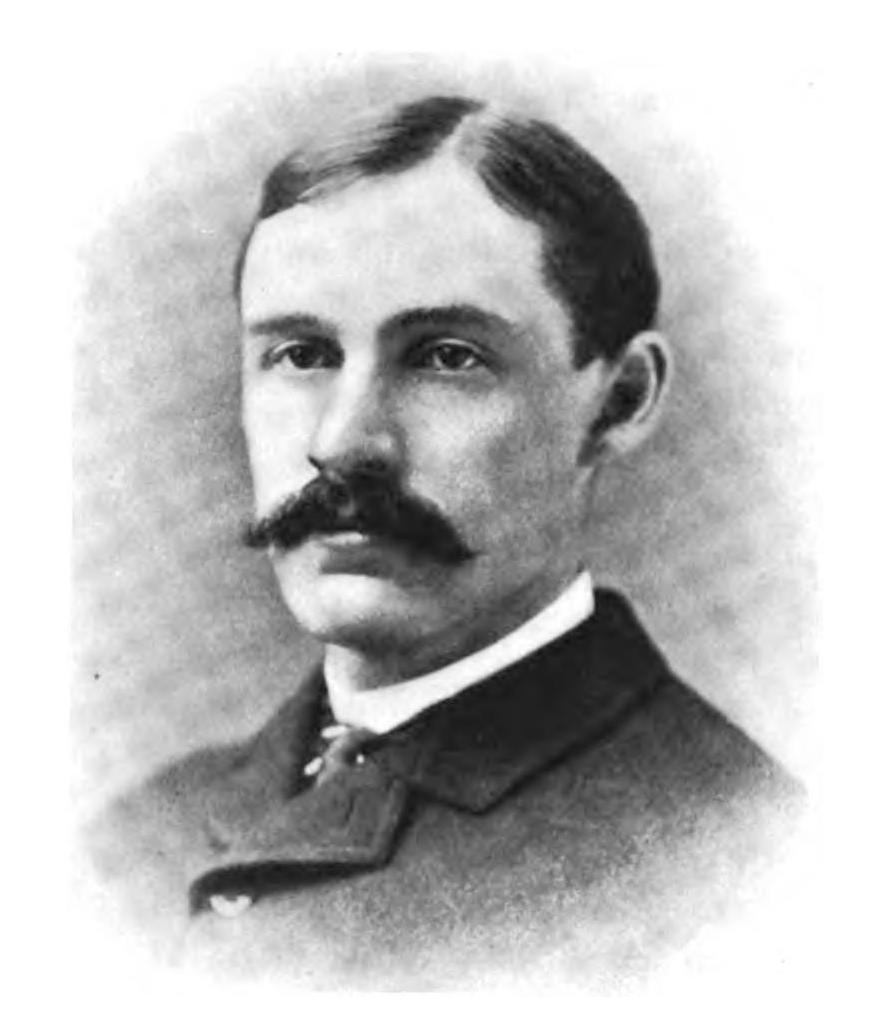
- Ten Eyck in a 1906 publication
- Born: July 25, 1856; Albany, New York, U.S.
- Died: November 29, 1887 (aged 31); Albany, New York, U.S.
- Education: Yale University
- Occupation: Journalist
- Relatives: Ten Eyck family

Henry James Ten Eyck (July 25, 1856 – November 29, 1887) was an American journalist. He was an editor of the Albany Evening Journal.

== Early life ==
Henry James Ten Eyck was born on July 25, 1856, in Albany, New York, to Caroline E. (née Crane) and Philip Ten Eyck. He graduated from The Albany Academy in 1874 and remained at home for a year. He graduated from Yale University in 1879.

== Career ==
Following graduation, Ten Eyck worked for his father at the Albany Evening Journal. He was promoted to managing editor in October 1883. He was city editor from 1885 to his death. He also worked as a correspondent for papers in other cities, including the Chicago Tribune. He was a contributor to magazines, including the Century and the Popular Science Monthly. The article "Some Tendencies in Taxation" in Popular Science was popular.

Ten Eyck was secretary of the Yale Alumni Association of Eastern New York.

== Personal life ==
Ten Eyck did not marry. He died of typhoid fever on November 29, 1887, in Albany.
