= Katya Cengel =

American author and journalist (born 1976)

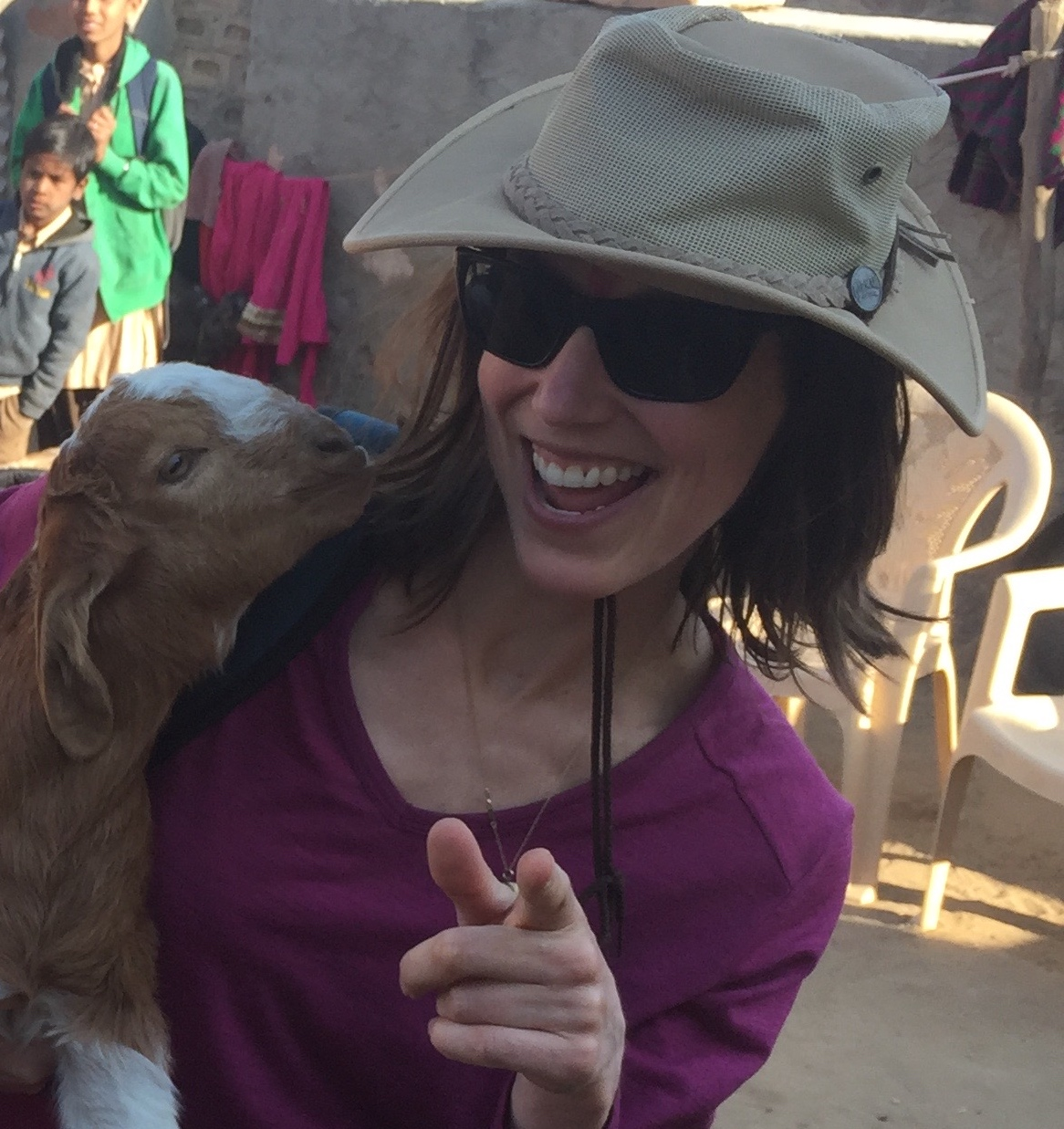
- Cengel in 2020
- Born: 1976 (age 49–50); Oakland, California, U.S.
- Education: University of California, San Diego
- Occupations: Author and journalist
- Writing career
- Notable work: From Chernobyl with Love: Reporting from the Ruins of the Soviet Union
- Website: katyacengel.com

Katya Danielle Cengel (born 1976) is an American author and journalist.

== Early life ==
Cengel was born in Oakland, California. In 1998, she earned a bachelor's degree in Literature Writing from UC San Diego.

== Career ==
In 1998, Cengel was working as a features writer for The Baltic Times newspaper in Riga, Latvia. Later, Cengel was a general assignment reporter for the Kyiv Post. She also reported regularly for the San Francisco Chronicle and BBC World Service. Cengel described her Central European life and work in her 2019 book From Chernobyl With Love: Reporting from the Ruins of the Soviet Union for which she won the IPPY and Foreword INDIE awards.

Returning to the United States, Cengel joined the Louisville Courier-Journal as a general assignment features reporter. Her series on the families of the Lost Boys of Sudan received second place feature writing from the Society of Professional Journalists 2005 Green Eyeshade Award.

Cengel teaches journalism at Cal Poly San Luis Obispo and UC Berkeley Extension.

== Bibliography ==
- Bluegrass Baseball: A Year In The Minor League Life (2012) Lincoln, Nebraska: University of Nebraska Press. Review
- Exiled: From the Killing Fields of Cambodia to California and Back (2018) Lincoln, Nebraska: Potomac Books, An imprint of the University of Nebraska Press. ISBN 9781640120341 Review
- From Chernobyl With Love: Reporting from the Ruins of the Soviet Union (2019). Lincoln, Nebraska: Potomac Books, An imprint of the University of Nebraska Press. ISBN 9781640122048 Review
