= Jeanne Bellamy =

American journalist and businesswoman

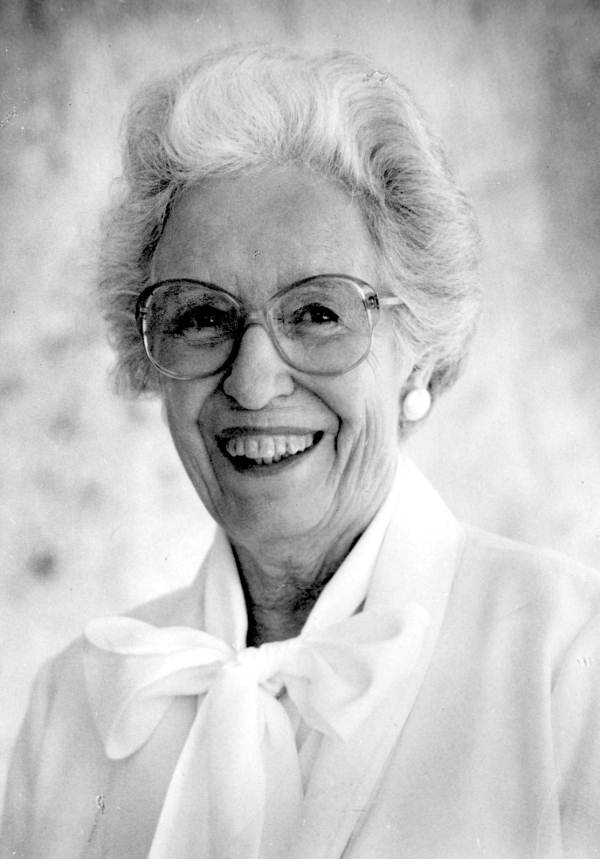
- Born: November 15, 1911; Brooklyn, New York
- Died: March 21, 2004 (aged 92); Cutler Bay, Florida
- Other names: Jeanne Bellamy Bills
- Education: Barnard College (1928–29); Rollins College (BA, 1933)
- Spouse: John T. Bills (d. 1967)

Jeanne Bellamy (November 15, 1911 – March 21, 2004) was an American journalist and businesswoman who, along with Marjory Stoneman Douglas, advocated the creation of Everglades National Park and, later, against overuse of the natural resources of the park.

== Biography ==
Born in Brooklyn, Bellamy's family moved to Florida when she was three. She started her journalistic career in 1937 when she took a job as a reporter for the Miami Herald, eventually becoming the first woman editorial writer and courts reporter at the paper, as well as a member of its editorial board from 1951. After her retirement from the paper in 1973, Bellamy became the first woman president of the Greater Miami Chamber of Commerce from 1977 to 1978, and later, she represented Coral Gables on the governing board of the South Florida Water Management District from 1979 until 1983, where she opposed any unnecessary use of the park's water resources.

Bellamy was awarded the Thomas Barbour Medal for Conservation by Fairchild Tropical Garden in 1984. She was also a member of the Society of Woman Geographers. An annual scholarship is awarded by the Greater Miami Chamber of Commerce in recognition of Bellamy's civic service and time as chair of the organization.

== Publications ==
- "Newspapers of America's Last Frontier". Tequesta. 1 (12). Historical Society of Southern Florida. 1952. ISSN 0363-3705.
