= Greta von Nessen =

Industrial designer (1898–1978)

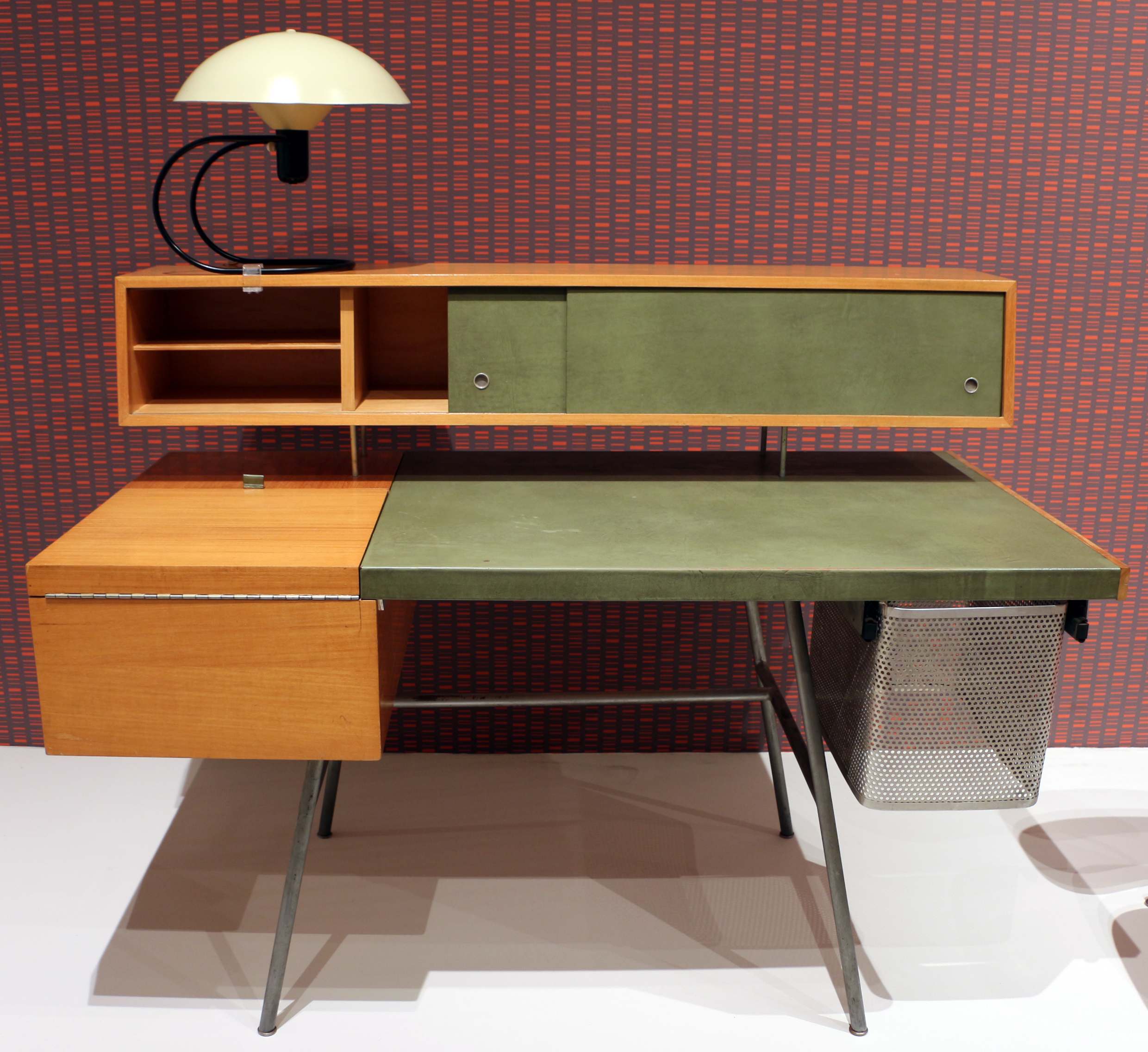
Lamp by Greta von Nessen (1951) on a George Nelson desk

Greta von Nessen (December 6, 1898 – 1975) was an industrial designer. The wife of Walter von Nessen, founders of Nessen Studios, now Nessen Lamps Inc., after his death she continued his shop and developed designs of her own. She is most famous for the aluminum, and enameled steel Anywhere Lamp (1951). Though, "there was nothing like it...at the same time, there was absolutely nothing new about it; all of the lamp's parts had been available as early as the 1920s." Her designs have been featured in the Museum of Modern Art and on a US postage stamp.
