= Ruth Vassos =

American writer (1890s–1965)

- Born: Ruth Carrier; 1890s Albany, New York, US
- Died: February 18, 1965; Wilton, Connecticut, US
- Other names: Ruth Carriere, Ruth Dodds (after first marriage in 1912)
- Occupation: Writer
- Spouse: John Vassos

Ruth Vassos (born 1890s – died February 18, 1965), born Ruth Carrier, was an American writer. She collaborated with her husband, designer John Vassos.

== Early life ==
Ruth Carrier was born in Albany, New York in the 1890s (sources vary on the exact year), the daughter of Fred Carrier and Emma Regnier Carrier.

== Career ==
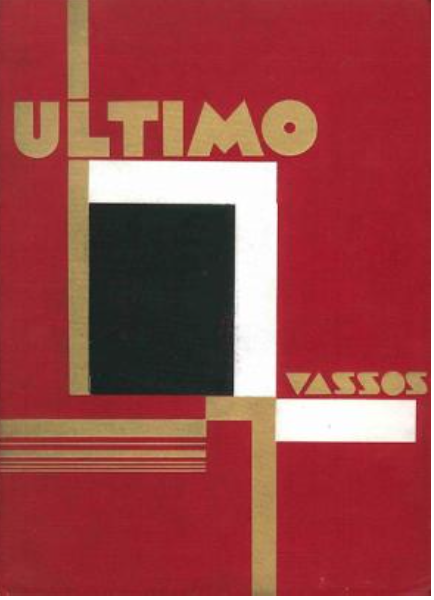
Cover of Ultimo (1930), by John and Ruth Vassos

Vassos was a fashion writer and editor in New York City. She was editor of Press of the Avenue, a fashion industry magazine. She was a fashion consultant working with Saks Fifth Avenue. She received a government citation for her volunteer work during World War II. She was co-founder and publicist of the Silvermine Guild of Artists, and the Silvermine Festival.

Vassos also wrote the text for illustrated books, most notably Ultimo, an imaginative narration of life under the earth (1930), a post-apocalyptic science fiction story illustrated by her husband. Other titles written by Ruth Vassos and illustrated by John Vassos included Contempo: This American Tempo (1929), about modern urban life, and Humanities (1935), a meditation on social issues, including peace, education, food, crime, and war.

== Personal life ==
Ruth Carrier married twice. Her first husband was salesman Walter S. Dodds; they married in 1912, and divorced in 1915. She married again, to designer John Vassos, in 1923. They lived in Norwalk, Connecticut after 1935. She died in 1965, in a nursing home in Wilton, Connecticut. Her papers are included in the John Vassos Papers at the Archives of American Art, Smithsonian Institution. The Vassos's house in Norwalk is listed on the Connecticut State Register of Historic Places.
