= Robert Percival Porter =

American journalist, diplomat, and statistician

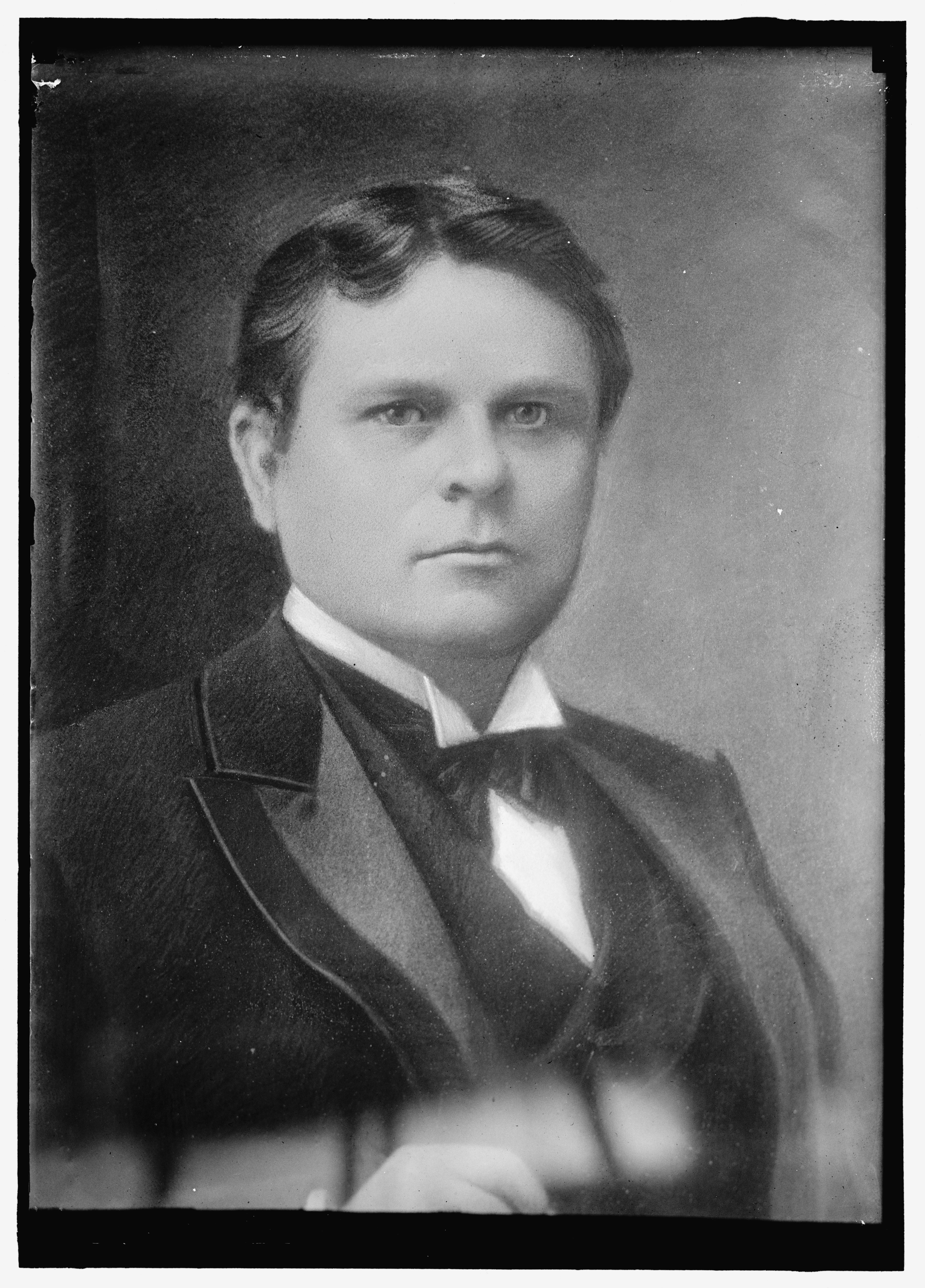

Robert Percival Porter (June 30, 1852 – February 28, 1917) was an American journalist, diplomat, and statistician who wrote on economic subjects. He served as Superintendent of the Census (1889–1893). In the statistical field, the first use of the term "computer" comes in an article in the Journal of the American Statistical Association archives by Porter in 1891. The article discusses about the use of Hermann Hollerith's machine in the 11th Census of the United States.

== Early life and education ==
Robert Percival Porter was born in Norwich, England, June 30, 1852. His father was James Winearls Porter of Marham, Norfolk.

He received his education at King Edward VI School, Norwich, and privately in the U.S.

== Career ==
He removed to the United States on the death of his father in 1869, and begran active life as a school teacher in Illinois. When the Chicago Inter Ocean was founded, in 1872, he joined the staff of that paper, though his first statistical and economic writings were contributed to the Galaxy, 1876, and The Princeton Review, 1878–79.

From 1879 to 1882, he had charge of the second division of the United States census under Gen. Francis A. Walker, and wrote the official reports on wealth, debt, taxation, and transportation. In 1882, he was appointed a member of the U.S. Tariff Commission, and in this capacity he took an active part in framing the tariff law of 1883.

He then joined the editorial staff of the New-York Tribune and was sent to Europe to study and report industrial and housing conditions on the Continent. He contributed regular letters on European industries for fifteen months.

Upon returning to the United States in 1885, he became one of the editors of The Philadelphia Press. On December 1, 1887, Porter founded the New York Press, assisted by Frank Hatton. In March, 1889, he was appointed superintendent of the 11th census, resigning in September 1893, to return to the editorial control of the New York Press.

In 1895–96, Porter reported on the industries and commerce of Japan for the Manufacturers' Association of America. He took an active part in the campaigns of President William McKinley, and in 1898, the latter appointed him a special commissioner to Cuba and Puerto Rico. He framed the tariff laws for these islands and the Philippines, and conducted the negotiations with Gen. Gomez that ended in the disbandment of the Cuban army. From 1900, he conducted a series of economic studies relating to street and other railways in Europe.

In 1904, he joined the staff of the London Times.

He was a member of American and English Statistical Associations, and of the Republican, Ardsley, and Lawyers' Clubs of New York.

== Personal life ==
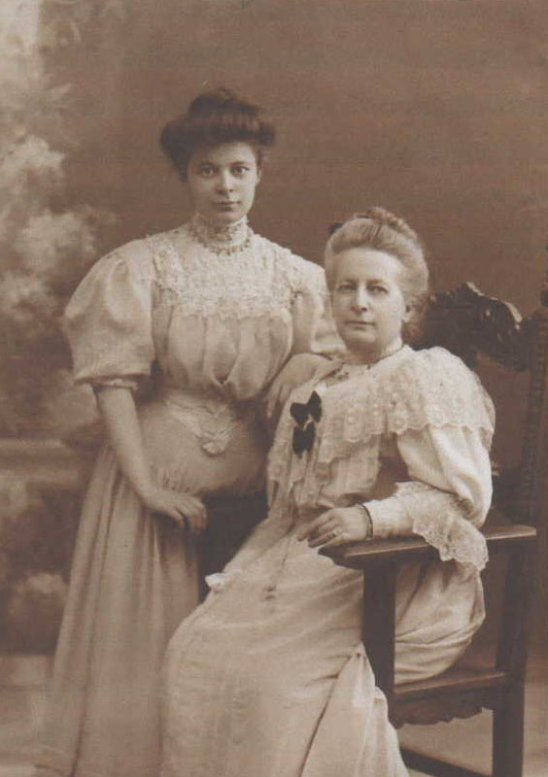
"Polly" and Alice Porter (l-r), ca. 1910

On March 7, 1884, he married Alice Hobbins.

He had four children, including Mary "Polly" Winearls Porter.

Robert Percival Porter died February 28, 1917.

== Selected works ==
- The West : from the census of 1880, a history of the industrial, commercial, social, and political development of the states and territories of the West from 1800 to 1880, with Henry Gannett,1882
- Protection and free trade to-day : at home and abroad, in field and workshop, 1884
- Free trade folly, 1886
- Industrial Cuba : being a study of present commercial and industrial conditions, with suggestions as to the opportunities presented in the Island for American capital, enterprise, and labour, 1899
- Life of William McKinley, soldier, lawyer, statesman, 1896
- The dangers of municipal trading, 1907
- The full recognition of Japan, being a detailed account of the economic progress of the Japanese empire to 1911, 1911
- Japan, the new world-power : being a detailed account of the progress and rise of the Japanese empire, 1915
- Japan, the rise of a modern power, 1917
