= Victor Eubank =

Victor G. C. Eubank (August 14, 1883 in Nodaway County, Missouri – 1955 in New York City) was an American journalist and finance writer.

Eubank in 1919

== Career ==
Prior to embarking in journalism, Eubank studied medicine at the University of Missouri School of Medicine; he then joined The Kansas City Star as a reporter in 1903. He next worked for a variety of Chicago newspapers, which led to his being hired by the Associated Press in 1913 to head their Chicago bureau.

In August 1914, he joined Essanay Studios; a contemporary news report in Variety stated that he was a "press agent", however, in 1926, Who's Who in America stated that he had been a "literary and supervising director".

During the First World War, he joined the United States Army Signal Corps, where he edited and supervised the production of propaganda and news films. In 1918, he was assigned to the American Expeditionary Forces, "to take charge of photographic work abroad"; however, the Armistice was signed while he was still in Hoboken. He subsequently returned to Essanay, but by February 1919 had left them again.

He rejoined the Associated Press in 1920, and in 1922 was assigned to Helena, Montana, where he established the first AP bureau there. He also worked at the AP bureaus in San Francisco and New York, and in 1925 was assigned to Tokyo, where he served as bureau chief. He remained in Tokyo until 1930, then ran the AP bureau in Moscow until 1931, after which he transferred to Warsaw. Following this, he returned to New York City, where he wrote daily financial news for the next fifteen years.

On August 13, 1948, Eubank retired.

== Death ==
On November 19, 1955, Eubank told a neighbor that he was going out for dinner. On November 24th, that neighbor reported him missing, after noticing that "newspapers were piling up" in front of the door to Eubank's apartment. On December 11, his body was retrieved from the Hudson River; an autopsy indicated that he had drowned, and that there were no signs of violence.
