= Woman's National Press Association =

Woman's National Press Association (W.N.P.A.) was an American professional association for women journalists. The constitution declared that the object of the association was to advance and encourage women in literary work, and to secure the benefits arising from organized effort. Any woman who had published original matter in book form, or in any reputable journal, was entitled to membership. Any woman's press association could become auxiliary to this association by subscribing to its constitution and paying ten percent per capita annually into its treasury. Established in Washington, D.C., July 10, 1882, it ended its activities in the mid-1920s.

== Inception ==
In the summer of 1881, three correspondents of Washington, D.C. frequently met in council to discuss plans for the organization of a press club. So earnest were their convictions, that they called a meeting of the writers of the city, which, by the courtesy of Jane H. Spofford, was held in the parlors of the Riggs House, July 10, 1882. Twenty-five women responded to the call, and an organization was then formed, known as the "Woman's Press Club". At this meeting, a petition asking Congress to set apart a press gallery expressly for women writers was signed by all present and duly presented to Congress. From this small and apparently insignificant beginning there evolved a chartered organization known as the Woman's National Press Association. No records of any previous woman's press association organized for co-operative exchange existed.

== History ==
The association was organized in 1882, through the efforts of Martha D. Lincoln ("Bessie Beech"), Emily Thornton Charles, Rose Braendle, and Nettie Sanford Chapin. The first officers elected were: Mrs. E. E. Briggs ("Olivia"), president; Braendle, vice-president; Lincoln, secretary; and Sanford, treasurer.

In 1884, a reorganization took place, Briggs still remaining the presiding officer. Eighteen months afterwards, she resigned, leaving the chair to the vice-president, Ruth C. Denison. At the annual meeting of that year, Lincoln was elected president, and held the office for eight years, during which time the membership doubled and regular fortnightly meetings were held.

The association was chartered January 3, 1888, under the same name, with the following charter officers: President, Martha D. Lincoln, first vice-president, Belva Ann Lockwood, second vice-president, Mrs. M. E. McPherson, secretary, Mrs. A. H. Mohl; treasurer, Mrs. H. B. Sperry; auditor; Mrs. M. R. Moore; elective members, executive committee, Mrs. E. T. Charles, Dr. C. B. Winslow, Mrs. E. J. Smith.

Through the efforts of the W.N.P.A., seats in both houses of Congress were set apart for the use of woman journalists.

Lincoln was succeeded in 1892 by Mary Smith Lockwood, who filled the office for three years. During this time, the membership was greatly increased, and the national character of the organization established by the union of several auxiliaries. Through the efforts of Lockwood, who was one of the lady managers of the World's Columbian Expositionn, the exhibit of the Woman's National Press Association won a medal, and each contributor a diploma.

In 1895, Mrs. H. B. Sperry was elected to the first office and reëlected in 1896.

The association was a member of the International League of Press Clubs, and sent delegates to its annual meetings. It also continued its membership in the General Federation of Women's Clubs.

Among its members were Sara Jane Lippincott ("Grace Greenwood"), Mary F. Foster, Ella M. S. Marble, Clara Bewick Colby, E. D. E. N. Southworth, Olive Logan, and Clara Barton.

The association sustained for years a Publication Bureau, and issued many works of interest, notably in the Potomac series.

In 1897, the president was Mrs. E. S. Cromwell; corresponding secretary, Mrs. M. H. Haeth; treasurer, Mrs. M. S. Gist; past president, Mrs. H. B. Sperry.

In December, 1894, the W.N.P.A. issued the call for the formation of a federated organization in the District of Columbia, and the first meeting was held in its rooms and the officers chosen from its members. Its rollcall included nearly 100 resident members.

== Administration ==
The Woman's National Press Association owed no debts.

Each member of the club paid an initiation fee of US$2, in addition to other requirements, and annual dues of US$1. As the right to vote at elections depended upon the payment of dues, they were usually promptly met. This fund paid for the printing of the Year Book, stationery, cards of invitation, postage and other incidentals, besides rent for headquarters when necessary. Money for the support of the publication bureau was taken from the fund secured from those who patronized it; it was an active branch of the W.N.P.A.

The by-laws provided that the regular meetings of the association would be held fortnightly, on Fridays. The use of parlors for business and public gatherings, which were held semi-monthly, was donated by the host of the Riggs House, Mr. Staples. By 1889, the association secured permanent headquarters at Willard's Hotel. The expenses incurred for banquets, excursions, and receptions were generally met by assessments on the active members. For railroad fare, the management of the Chesapeake and Ohio Railway saw to it that the delegates of the W.N.P.A. never get left.

Reports of elections and of all public meetings were published by the Washington press as news.

The object of the club was for the mutual advancemeut of its members, and to encourage good newspaper work among women. Literary contributions were expected from every member when called upon. Not all of the members were connected with daily papers, but some were editors of books and magazines, or contributors to the latter. Papers presented were always open for discussion. The club was in correspondence with press women and club women in England, France, Germany and Austria.

== Notable people ==
- Clara Barton
- Rose Braendle
- Nettie Sanford Chapin
- Emily Thornton Charles
- Clara Bewick Colby
- Ruth C. Denison
- Mary F. Foster
- Martha D. Lincoln
- Sara Jane Lippincott
- Mary Smith Lockwood
- Olive Logan
- Ella M. S. Marble
- E. D. E. N. Southworth
