= Martha D. Lincoln =

American author and journalist

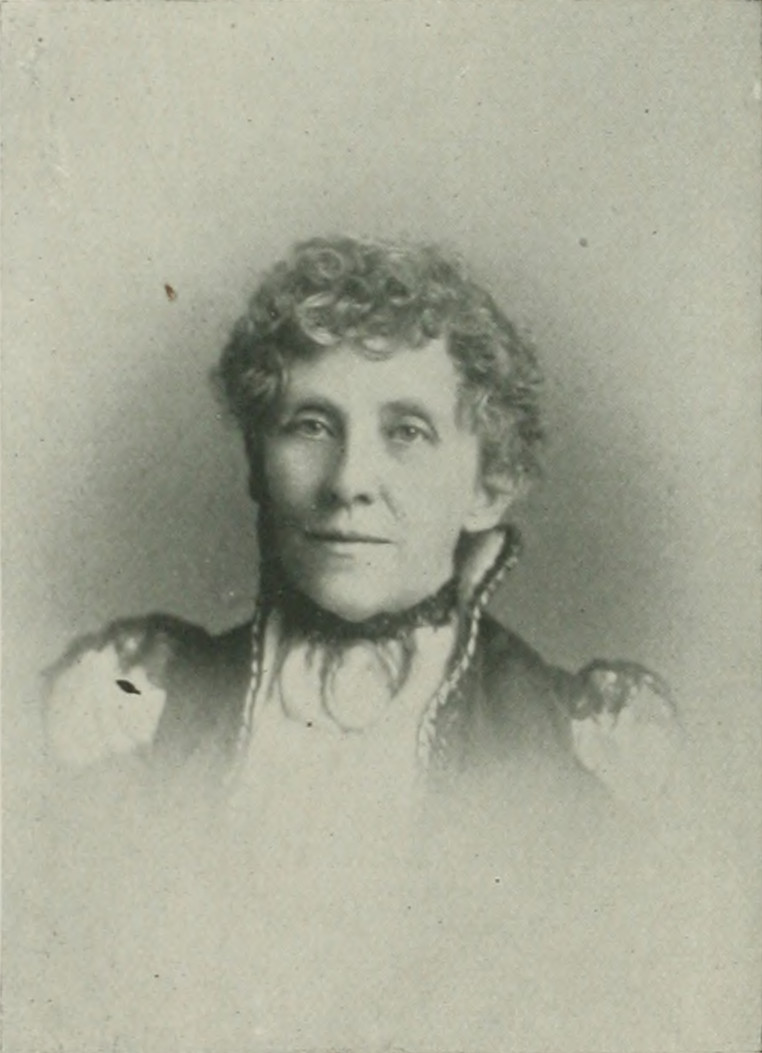
- "A Woman of the Century"
- Born: Martha D. Brown; 1838 near Richfield Springs, New York, U.S.
- Died: October 6, 1911 (aged 72–73)
- Education: Whitestown Seminary
- Occupations: author; journalist
- Spouse: Henry M. Lincoln (m. 1858)
- Children: 1
- Writing career
- Pen name: "Bessie Beech"
- Notable works: Beech Leaves; Central Figures in American Science

Martha D. Lincoln (1838 – October 6, 1911) was an American author and journalist of the long nineteenth century, widely known by her pen name, Bessie Beech. In 1882, she co-founded the Woman's National Press Association, which was the first chartered woman's press organization in the world. She was its first secretary, and served the organization eight years as president.

== Early life and education ==
Martha D. Brown was born near Richfield Springs, Otsego County, New York, (Note: According to Herringshaw (1914), Martha was born in Herkimer County, New York.) in 1838. (Note: According to Familysearch.org, Martha was born in 1836. According to Herkimer County Historical Society (1992), Martha was born in 1839.) Her parents were James Brown (1796–1875) and Sally Cole (1796-?). There was an older sister, Laura C. Brown (1831–?).

She was educated in Whitestown Seminary, Whitestown, Oneida County, New York.

== Career ==
When she was sixteen years old, she began her literary career in numerous contributions to the Dover, New Hampshire, Morning Star, later published in Boston, Massachusetts.

She married Henry M. Lincoln (1834–1909), a medical student of Canandaigua, New York, in 1858. Soon after her marriage, she became a regular contributor to Moore's Rural New Yorker, the Morning Star, and the Northern Christian Advocate. Her husband's health became impaired, and in 1871, they moved to Washington, D.C., to secure a warmer climate. The financial crisis of 1871 and 1872 wrecked his fortune. Then Mrs. Lincoln took up journalistic work in earnest. She became the correspondent of the old Daily Chronicle, the Republican, the Union, the Republic, and several Sunday journals, and retained her connection with papers outside of Washington. In January, 1878, she contributed to The New York Times a description of President Rutherford B. Hayes' silver wedding, and, on June 20, 1878, she described the Hastings-Platt wedding in the White House for the New-York Tribune. She corresponded for the New York Sun and the Jamestown Daily Journal during the same year. She reported for the Cleveland Plain Dealer and the New York Tribune and Sun. The amount of work she turned out was remarkable.

Her literary work included some superior verse, such as "Home and Freedom", which was included in The Magazine of Poetry and Literary Review (February 1895). Much of her best work was included in her Beech Leaves, and her later work, Central Figures in American Science. She did a great amount of literary work as biographical sketches of famous women, illustrated articles and poems for children.

On July 10, 1882, she, with two other journalists in Washington, D.C. organized the Woman's National Press Association, the first chartered woman's press organization in the world. She became its first secretary, and afterwards, for several years, served the organization as president.

In 1891, she was appointed delegate to the International Peace Congress, in Rome, Italy, and again, in 1892, delegate to the Peace Congress, in Bern, Switzerland. The same year, she was elected president of the American Society of Authors, for Washington, D.C.

She wrote four articles about John Wesley Powell, "Boyhood and Youth", "The Soldier", "The Professor", and "The Explorer", which were published by Open Court (1902–03)).

== Personal life ==
From 1870, Dr. and Mrs. Lincoln resided in Washington, D.C. They had one child, a son, Judson Dulah Lincoln (1863–1942).

Martha D. Lincoln died October 6, 1911. (Note: According to Herkimer County Historical Society (1992), Martha died in 1910.)

== Selected works ==
- Beech Leaves
- Central Figures in American Science
