= Fanny Fern Fitzwater =

American fashion illustrator (1886-1966)

- Born: June 25, 1886; Penn Yan, New York
- Died: March 15, 1966 (aged 79); Geneva, New York
- Known for: journalism and illustration

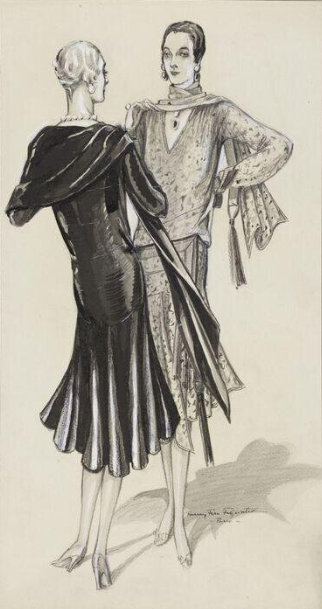
Fanny Fern Fitzwater, late 1920s fashion illustration

Fanny Fern Fitzwater (1886-1966) was an American fashion designer and fashion illustrator.

Fitzwater was born on June 25, 1886 in Penn Yan, New York. she attended Syracuse University and the Art Students League of New York. from the mid 1920d through the mid 1940s Fitzwater was a reporter for the New York Herald Tribune covering fashion and social events. For a time her column was syndicated. She subsequently moved to Kansas City, Missouri to pursue a teaching career at the Kansas City Art Institute.

Examples of her fashion illustrations are in the Victoria and Albert Museum where she is described as a "recognised fashion authority".

Fitzwater died on March 15, 1966 in Geneva, New York.
