= Tom Wilber =

American journalist and public speaker

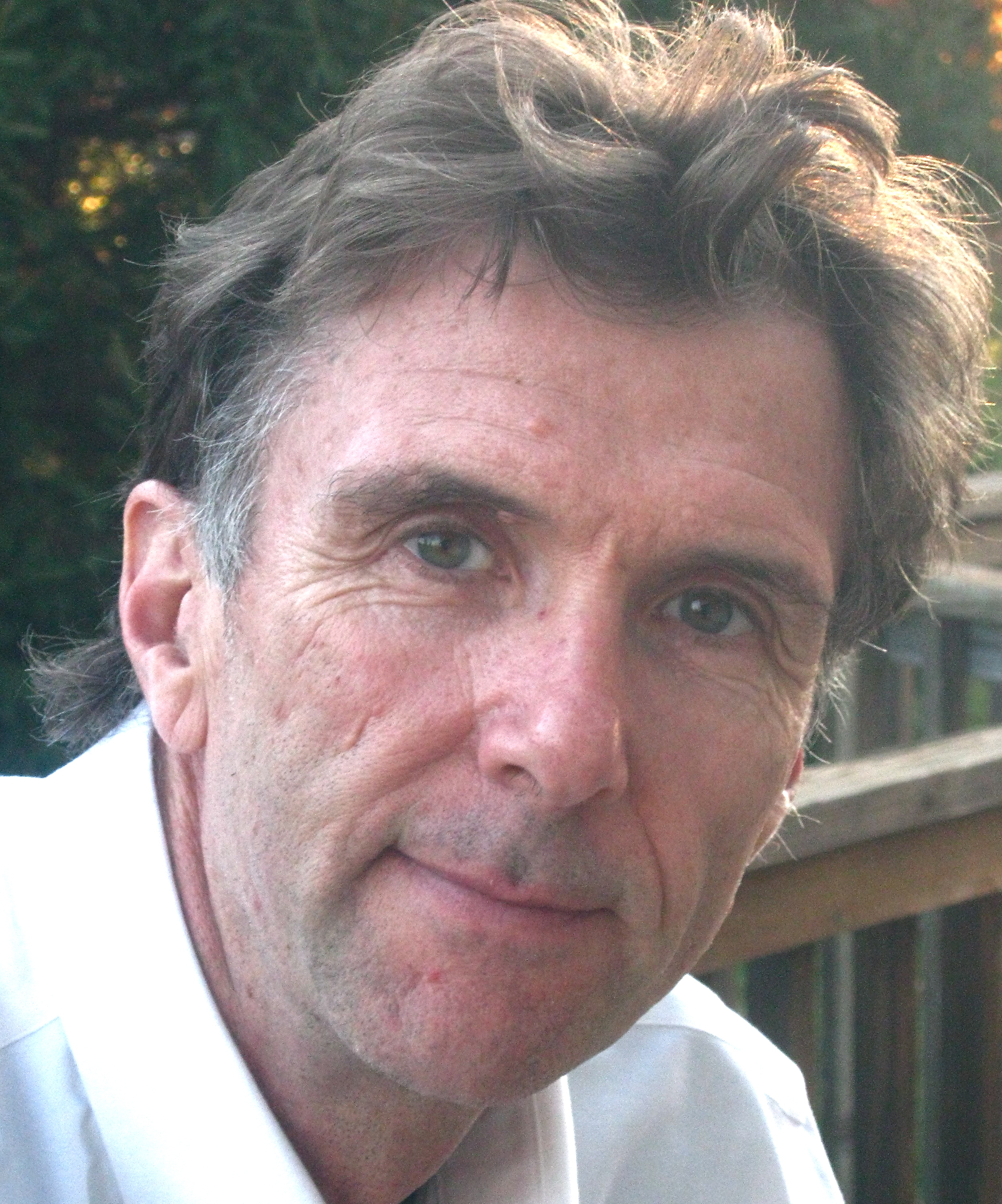
- Occupations: Journalist, Public Speaker
- Years active: 1989–present

Tom Wilber is an American journalist and public speaker who specializes in environmental issues. During 25 years with Gannett's USA Today Network, he won multiple individual and team Best of Gannett honors for coverage of issues ranging from catastrophic flooding in upstate New York to impacts of shale gas development in New York and Pennsylvania. His 2012 book, Under the Surface: Fracking, Fortunes and the Fate of the Marcellus Shale (Cornell University Press), was selected as a finalist for the 2013 New York Public Library’s Helen Bernstein Book Award for Excellence in Journalism. He has taught newspaper journalism at Binghamton University, and holds a master's degree from the S.I. Newhouse School of Public Communications program at Syracuse University.

== Books ==
- Vanishing Point: The Search for a B-24 Bomber Crew Lost on the World War II Home Front, Three Hills, 2023.
- Under the Surface: Fracking, Fortunes and the Fate of the Marcellus Shale, Cornell University Press, 2012.

== Reviews ==
- Publishers Weekly review of Vanishing Point
- The New York Review of Books review of Under the Surface
- Associated Press review of Under the Surface
- Publishers Weekly review of Under the Surface
- Library Journal review of Under the Surface
- Journal of Comparative Policy Analysis review of Under the Surface

== Interviews and articles ==
- Radio interviews on WNYC'sThe Brian Lehrer Show
- Radio interview on WSKG's Off the Page
- Radio interview on WAMC's The Round Table
- Radio interview on WCNY's Capitol Press Room
- Radio interview on Australian Broadcasting Corporation's Radio National Breakfast
- Movie review in The Huffington Post
- Featured on The New York Times' Dot Earth
- Article in Buffalo Spree
- Article in the Press & Sun Bulletin
