= Charles A. Windle =

American journalist (1866–1934)

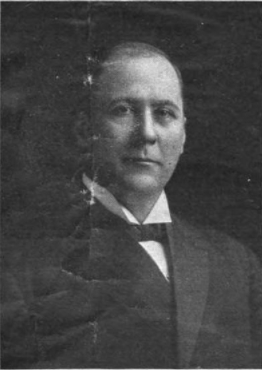
- Born: September 9, 1866; Ethel, Macon, Missouri, United States
- Died: January 5, 1934 (aged 67)
- Occupation: Editor
- Children: 4

Charles A. Windle (September 9, 1866 – January 5, 1934) was a Chicago journalist and opponent of prohibition.

Windle was born in Ethel, Missouri. He became editor of William Brann's Iconoclast in 1903; the magazine changed its title to The Liberal in 1926, and Windle remained editor until his death. According to Frank Luther Mott, a historian of American magazines, Windle was "a picturesque and violent writer, in the Brann tradition". He began running anti-prohibition columns in the magazine in 1911, and continued to criticize it throughout the dry era, publishing several pamphlets in that cause, including "The Case Against Prohibition". He was one of the founders of the Association Opposed to Prohibition, and debated "Pussyfoot" Johnson, a well-known prohibitionist, in Scotland. He was married and had three sons and a daughter. His son, C. Pliny Windle, became business manager of the magazine after World War I, and then associate editor, finally taking over the magazine after his father's death.

He was well-known as a campaigner for Democratic candidates, speaking extensively in Illinois and Iowa on behalf of William Jennings Bryan.
