= Eric Olander =

American journalist

- Education: University of California, Berkeley (BA); The University of Hong Kong (MIPA)

Eric Olander is an American journalist and Editor in Chief of the China-Global South Project, a research and analysis platform that focuses on China's engagements in the Global South. He is also one of the hosts of the China-Global South Project's podcast.

Based in Southeast Asia, Olander formerly served as a media executive for France 24 and Elle Vietnam. Olander has extensively commented on China-Africa relations, including the Belt and Road Initiative, COVID-19, and in the context of US-Africa relations.
