= Anna Maria Mead Chalmers =

American journalist and children's literature writer

- Born: Anna Maria Campbell Hickman; Detroit, Michigan Territory, USA
- Died: Albemarle County, Virginia, USA
- Genre: children's literature

Anna Maria Mead Chalmers (born Anna Maria Campbell Hickman; July 23, 1809 – December 8, 1891) was an American journalist and children's literature writer.

== Biography ==
Anna Maria Campbell Hickman was born on July 23, 1809, in Detroit.

In February 1830, she married George Alexander Otis, Jr. He died in 1831. In 1837, she married Rev. Zachariah Mead. He died on November 27, 1840. In 1841, she opened a Richmond boarding school, Mrs. Mead's School.

On January 3, 1856, she married David Chalmers. In 1863, she moved to New York.

She wrote children's books. Her work appeared in the Boston Home Journal, the New York Churchman, the New York Tribune, and the Southern Literary Messenger.

Chalmers died on December 8, 1891, aged 82, in Albemarle County, Virginia. She was buried in Shockoe Cemetery.

== Selected works ==
- The Good Son, 1834
- The Good Resolution, 1834
- The Sisters, 1834
- Sketches By A Christian's Way-side, H. Hooker 1846.
- Brown and Arthur, 1861
