= New York Press (historical) =

Former American newspaper (1887–1916)

- Owner: Frank Munsey
- Founder(s): Robert Percival Porter; Frank Hatton
- Editor: Erwin Wardman
- Founded: December 1887
- Ceased publication: July 2, 1916
- City: New York City
- Country: United States

The New York Press was a New York City newspaper founded by Robert Percival Porter and Frank Hatton in December 1887. It continued publication until July 2, 1916, when its owner Frank Munsey merged it with his newly purchased The Sun. The New York Press published notable writers such as Stephen Crane.

Its editor Erwin Wardman coined the term "yellow journalism" in early 1897, to refer to the work of Joseph Pulitzer's New York World and William Randolph Hearst's New York Journal. Wardman was the first to publish the term but there is evidence that expressions such as "yellow journalism" and "school of yellow kid journalism" were already used by newsmen of that time. Wardman never defined the term exactly, although possibly it was a mutation from an earlier slander where Wardman twisted "new journalism" into "nude journalism". In 1898 the paper simply elaborated: "We called them Yellow because they are Yellow."

Press Sports Editor Jim Price coined the name "Yankees" to describe the New York American League baseball team, then known as the "Highlanders". Ernest J. Lanigan, a renowned baseball statistician who founded Baseball Magazine and published The Baseball Cyclopedia, the first encyclopedia about "America's Pastime", also served as sports editor on the Press.

Early issues of the New York Press are, as of 2023, unavailable online, however they can be found on microfilm at the New York Public Library.
