= List of pen names =

This is a list of pen names used by notable authors of written work. A pen name or nom de plume is a pseudonym adopted by an author. A pen name may be used to make the author' name more distinctive, to disguise the author's gender, to distance the author from their other works, to protect the author from retribution for their writings, to combine more than one author into a single author, or for any of a number of reasons related to the marketing or aesthetic presentation of the work. The author's name may be known only to the publisher, or may come to be common knowledge.

== A ==
Pen name	Real name	Details
A. C. Q. W.	Anna Cabot Quincy Waterston	19th-century American poet, novelist, hymnist, diarist
A. H. Tammsaare	Anton Hansen	20th-century Estonian writer
A. J. Finn	Daniel Mallory	Author of The Woman in the Window
A. Flowerdew	Alice Flowerdew	English teacher, religious poet, hymnist
A Friend	Mary Elizabeth Lee	19th-century American writer
A Lady	Hannah Pickard	19th-century American novelist
A Lady	Jane Austen	19th-century British novelist
A Lady of Maine	Sally Wood	Maine's first novelist
A Lady of Massachusetts	Sally Wood	Maine's first novelist
A Lady of South Carolina	Mary Elizabeth Moragne Davis	19th-century American diarist, author
A Layman	Samuel Heywood (chief justice)	18th-century barrister and dissenter
A New Englander Over-Sea	John Neal	Used to publish Authorship, a Tale
A.A. Fair	Erle Stanley Gardner	One of several that he used
Aapeli	Simo Puupponen	20th-century Finnish writer and chatty article writer
Aaron Wolfe	Dean Koontz	
Abigail Van Buren	Pauline Phillips and then Jeanne Phillips	Mother and daughter advice columnists for Dear Abby
Abram Tertz	Andrei Sinyavsky	
Abu Nuwas	Hasin ibn Hani al Hakami	8th-century Arabic language poet (Persia)
Acton Bell	Anne Brontë	
Ada L. Halstead	Laura Eugenia Newhall	American writer
Adasha	Katherine Grinnell	American lecturer, author, social reformer
Adidnac	Lily C. Whitaker	American author, educator
Adrienne	Julia Pleasants Creswell	19th-century American poet, novelist (also used pen name, "Amelia")
Adunis	Ali Ahmad Said Esber	Syrian poet, essayist and translator
Æ	George William Russell	Irish poet and theosophist (1867 - 1935)
Aiguillette	Matilda Marian Pullan	19th-century British writer
Alan Gould	Victor Canning	
Alan Smithee	various	Pen name used by American film directors under certain circumstances
Alberto Moravia	Alberto Pincherle	
Alcofribas Nasier	François Rabelais	
Alex Kava	Sharon M. Kava	American author of psychological suspense novels
Alexander Kent	Douglas Reeman	
Alexis Hill; Alexis Hill Jordan	Louise Titchener and Ruth Glick	20th-century American romance novelists
Algoth Tietäväinen	Algot Untola	20th-century Finnish author
Ali Hazelwood	Unknown	Italian-born American romance novelist and neuroscience professor who wrote The Love Hypothesis, Check & Mate, among other books
Alice Acland	Anne Wignall	20th-century English author
Alice Addertongue	Benjamin Franklin	
Alice Campion	Denise Tart, Jane St Vincent Welch, Jane Richards, Jenny Crocker, and Madeline Oliver	Group of Australian collaborative writers
Alma Vivian Mylo	Annie Virginia McCracken	American author, editor
Almafuerte	Pedro Bonifacio Palacios	19th-century Argentine poet
Alyssa Howard	Louise Titchener, Eileen Buckholtz, Ruth Glick, and Carolyn Males	20th-century American romance novelists
Amanda Cross	Carolyn Gold Heilbrun	20th-century American mystery writer
Amanda Quick	Jayne Ann Krentz	American writer of romance novels
Amelia	Amelia B. Coppuck Welby	19th-century American poet
Ana Paula Arendt	Railssa Peluti Alencar	21st-century Brazilian author
Anatole France	Jacques Anatole François Thibault	20th-century French author
Andre Norton	Alice Mary Norton	20th-century American fiction author whose other aliases include Andrew North and Allen Weston
Andrej Zivor	Andrej Tisma	
Andrew MacAllan	James Leasor	20th-century British writer
Andrew MacDonald	William Luther Pierce	
Ann Atom	Jeannette H. Walworth	19th-century American novelist, journalist
Ann Landers	Ruth Crowley and then Eppie Lederer	Advice columnists for Ask Ann Landers
Anna L. Cunningham	Ada Langworthy Collier	American poet, writer
Anne Chaplet	Cora Stephan	20th-century German crime novelist and journalist
Anne Hathaway	Mary Bigelow Ingham	American writer, educator, social reformer
Anne Knish	Arthur Davison Ficke	Co-author of Spectra: A Book of Poetic Experiments
Anne Marreco	Anne Wignall	20th-century English author
Anne Perry	Juliet Marion Hulme	
Anne Rice	Howard Allen Frances O'Brien	Other aliases: Anne Rampling and A.N. Roquelaure
Annie L. Forcello	Florence Percy McIntyre	American short story writer & journalist; other alias, Florence Allen
Annulet Andrews	Maude Andrews Ohl	American journalist, poet, novelist
Anonymous	Joe Klein	Used to conceal his identity for the initial publication of the novel Primary Colors
Anthony Afterwit	Benjamin Franklin	
Anthony Boucher	William Anthony Parker White	American science fiction editor and writer of mystery novels and short stories
Anthony Burgess	John Anthony Burgess Wilson	20th-century British writer
Anthony Gilbert	Lucy Beatrice Malleson	British author of the Arthur Crook crime fiction novels
Anthony Mills	William Joseph Slim	British military commander after writing novels, short stories, and other publications earlier in his career
Anthony North	Dean Koontz	
Antosha Chekhonte	Anton Chekhov	19th-century Russian physician and author, who also used the pseudonyms "Man Without a Spleen" and "My Brother's Brother"
Arkon Daraul	Idries Shah	
Artemus Ward	Charles Farrar Browne	19th-century American humor writer
Asdreni	Aleksandër Stavre Drenova	20th-century Albanian poet
Auber Forestier	Aubertine Woodward Moore	19th-century American musician, writer
Aunt Dorothy	Lettie S. Bigelow	American poet and author of the long nineteenth century
Aunt Fanny	Frances Elizabeth Barrow	19th-century American children's writer
Aunt Julia	Julia Colman	American temperance educator, activist, editor, writer of the long nineteenth century
Aunt Libbie	Elizabeth O. Sampson Hoyt	American philosopher, author of the long nineteenth century
Aunt Marjorie	Margaret Elizabeth Sangster	American poet, author, editor of the long nineteenth century
Aunt Nabby	Lizzie P. Evans-Hansell	American novelist, short-story writer of the long nineteenth century
Aunt Philury	Helen M. Winslow	American editor, author, publisher, journalist of the long nineteenth century
Aunt Stomly	Emeline S. Burlingame	American editor and evangelist of the long nineteenth century
Avi	Edward Irving Wortis	
Ayako Sono	Chizuko Miura	20th-century Japanese novelist
Ayn Rand	Alisa Zinov'yevna Rosenbaum	20th-century fiction writer and creator of the philosophy Objectivism
Azorín	José Martínez Ruiz	

== B ==
Pen name	Real name	Details
B.	Phoebe Hinsdale Brown	19th-century American hymnwriter
B.	Matics Balázs	Hungarian blogger (The Honest Sorcerer) and science writer
B. Traven	unknown	20th-century novelist, aka Bruno Traven
B. E. E.	E. E. Brown	19th-century American writer, artist
B. F. Cocker	Benjamin Franklin	
Ba Jin	Li Yaotang	20th-century Chinese writer
Banaphul	Balāi Chānd Mukhopādhyāy	Bengali author, playwright and poet
Barbara Michaels	Barbara Mertz	
Barbara Vine	Ruth Rendell	Late 20th- and early 21st-century British author who wrote a subset of her work under this pseudonym
Bartholomew Gill	Mark C. McGarrity	American crime fiction novelist and newspaper feature writer of nature and outdoor recreation topics
BB	Denys Watkins-Pitchford	20th-century illustrator and children's book author
Beachcomber	J. B. Morton and D. B. Wyndham Lewis	Used for the surrealist humorous column By the Way in the Daily Express
bell hooks	Gloria Jean Watkins	
Belle Bremer	Martina Swafford	American poet of the long nineteenth century
Benevolus	Benjamin Franklin	
Bernardo Atxaga	Joseba Irazu Garmendia	Spanish Basque writer
Berrintho	Robert Roberthin	17th-century German poet
Bessie Beech	Martha D. Lincoln	American author and journalist of the long nineteenth century
Betsey Bancker	Mary E. C. Bancker	American author of the long nineteenth century
Betsy B.	Mary Therese Austin	19th-century American theater critic, travel writer
Bharathidasan	Kanagasabai Subburathnam	20th-century Tamil poet
Bing Xin	Xie Wanying	20th-century Chinese writer
Blaise Cendrars	Frédéric Louis Sauser	
Bob Hart	Al Trace	
Boris Akunin	Grigory Shalvovich Chkhartishvili	
Boum	Samantha Leriche-Gionet	French Canadian animator, illustrator, and comic strip author
Boz	Charles Dickens	19th-century British novelist
Brada	Henrietta Consuelo Sansom, Countess of Quigini Puliga	French writer, novelist
Branislav Nušić	Alkibijad Nuša	
Brian Coffey	Dean Koontz	
Brynjolf Bjarme	Henrik Ibsen	
Busy Body	Benjamin Franklin	

== C ==
Pen name	Real name	Details
C 33	Oscar Wilde	
C. H. H.	Clara H. Hazelrigg	American author, educator, reformer
C. H. Stranahan	Clara Harrison Stranahan	American author, college founder
C. S. Forester	Cecil Smith	20th-century writer of the Captain Horatio Hornblower novels, The African Queen, and other novels
Caelia Shortface	Benjamin Franklin	
Camilla K. Von K.	Mary Hall-Wood	19th-century American poet, editor, author
Cantinflas	Fortino Mario Alfonso Moreno Reyes	20th-century Mexican actor and filmmaker
Caris Sima	Clara Mountcastle	19th-century Canadian author
Carr Dickson	John Dickson Carr	20th-century author of detective stories
Carrie Carlton	Elizabeth Chamberlain Wright	19th-century California writer
Carter Dickson	John Dickson Carr	20th-century author of detective stories
Carter Holmes	John Neal	Used when writing for Blackwood's Magazine
Cassandra	William Connor	20th-century left-wing journalist for The Daily Mirror
Cassandra Clare	Judith Rumelt Lewis	American author of young adult fiction
Catharine Carr	Rosalind Wade	British novelist
Catherine Cole	Martha R. Field	American journalist
Catherine Shaw	Leila Schneps	Author of mathematically themed classic murder mysteries
Celestilian	Ruben Torke	German author
Chanakya	Jawaharlal Nehru	First Indian Prime Minister
Charles Louis Bernays	Karl Ludwig Bernays	German journalist
Charles C. Lee	Martha Parmelee Rose	American non-fiction writer
Charles Moulton	William Moulton Marston	Creator of Wonder Woman comic book character
Charles Norden	Lawrence Durrell	Author of The Alexandria Quartet and Panic Spring as Norden
Charlotte	Charlotte Fillebrown Jerauld	American poet, story writer
Charlotte Jay	Geraldine Halls	
Cherry Wilder	Cherry Barbara Grimm	
Chespirito	Roberto Gómez Bolaños	Mexican actor, comedian, filmmaker and writer
Cherubina de Gabriak	Elisaveta Ivanovna Dmitrieva	
Christa Hoch	Sophie Rogge-Börner	German writer, feminist and nationalist
Christian Reid	Frances Christine Fisher Tiernan	American author of Land of the Sky
Christina Lauren	Christina Hobbs, Lauren Billings	
Christianna Brand	Mary Christianna Lewis	British crime fiction writer
Christopher Pike	Kevin Christopher McFadden	Prolific author of young-adult horror and sci-fi novels
Citizen	Sarah Carmichael Harrell	American educator, temperance reformer, writer
Claire Morgan	Patricia Highsmith	American novelist and short story writer
Clare Richards; Clare Richmond	Louise Titchener and Carolyn Males	20th-century American romance novelists
Clarence Wellford	Louise Collier Willcox	American author, editor, anthologist, translator
Clark McMeekin	Dorothy Clark and Isabel McMeekin	Wrote historical novels
Clem Watts	Al Trace	
Clinton Montague	H. Maria George Colby	American writer
Clive Hamilton, N. W. Clerk	C. S. Lewis	Used when publishing Spirits in Bondage and Dymer
Codien Zwaardemaker-Visscher	Jacobina Berendina Zwaardemaker-Visscher	Dutch writer, translator and feminist
Colin Douglas	Colin Thomas Currie	20th-century Scottish novelist
Coralie	Mary M. Cohen	American social economist, writer
Cordwainer Smith	Paul M. A. Linebarger	20th-century science fiction author
Cousin Annie	Annie Maria Barnes	American journalist, editor, author
Cress	Alice Hobbins Porter	British-born American journalist, editor
Currer Bell	Charlotte Brontë	
Curtis Yorke	Susan Rowley Richmond Lee	Scottish writer, novelist
Curzio Malaparte	Kurt Erich Suckert	

== D ==
Pen name	Real name	Details
Daisy Eyebright	Sophia Orne Johnson	19th-century American author
Dan Crow	Ernest Aris	
Daniel Defoe	Daniel Foe	
Daniil Kharms	Daniil Ivanovich Yuvachev	
Danuta de Rhodes	Dan Rhodes	
Darkly Lem	Josh Eure, Craig Lincoln, Ben Murphy, Cadwell Turnbull, and M. Darusha Wehm	American authors
David Agnew	various	Pen name used by BBC television drama screenwriters under certain circumstances
David Axton	Dean Koontz	
David Meade	unknown	American conspiracy theorist, researcher, and book author
David Michaels	Raymond Benson	
Davina Blake	Deborah Swift	Used for her more contemporary work
Dazai Osamu	Shuji Tsushima	
Deanna Dwyer	Dean Koontz	
Diablo Cody	Brook Busey	Screenwriter
Diedrich Knickerbocker	Washington Irving	Early 19th-century U.S. writer
Dimasalang	José Rizal	National hero of the Philippines, author of Noli Me Tángere and El filibusterismo
Dina Linwood	S. M. I. Henry	American evangelist, temperance reformer, poet, author
Dominique Aury	Anne Desclos	20th-century French author and critic who wrote under this name for her early works
Dora Rosetti	Nelli Kaloglopoulou	20th-century Greek LGBT author
Douglas Spaulding	Ray Bradbury	
Dr. Seuss	Theodor Seuss Geisel	20th-century American writer and cartoonist, best known for his children's books; aka Theo LeSieg for books that he wrote and others illustrated

== E ==
Pen name	Real name	Details
E. B. C.	Essie B. Cheesborough	19th-century prolific American writer
E. Cavazza; Elisabeth Pullen	Elisabeth Cavazza	American author, journalist, music critic
E. G. A.	Emily Gillmore Alden	American author, educator
E. L. James	Erika Leonard, born Erika Mitchell	Author of Fifty Shades of Grey
E. Livingston Prescott	Edith Spicer Jay	British military novelist
E. N. Chapin	Nettie Sanford Chapin	19th-century American historian, author, newspaper publisher
E. S. Elliott	Emily Elizabeth Steele Elliott	19th-century English poet, hymnwriter, novelist, editor
E. V. Cunningham	Howard Fast	American novelist
Eando Binder	Earl and Otto Binder	Mid-20th-century science fiction authors
Eckhart Tolle	Ulrich Leonard Tolle	Author of The Power of Now
Ed McBain	Evan Hunter, born as Salvatore A. Lombino	
Edgar Box	Gore Vidal	
Edith May	Anne Drinker	19th-century American writer
Edith Van Dyne	L. Frank Baum	
Edmond Dantès	John Hughes	20th-century American screenwriter and director; used this name on later works
Edmund Crispin	Robert Bruce Montgomery	British crime fiction writer
Edogawa Ranpo	Tarō Hirai	
Edward Charles	Edward Charles Edmond Hemsted	20th-century British educator and author
Edward Fallon	Robert Gregory Browne, J.D. Rhoades, Tim Tresslar, Will Graham, Rob Cornell, Allan Leverone	Supernatural suspense series LINGER, written by multiple authors
Edward Garrett	Isabella Fyvie Mayo	19th-century Scottish poet, novelist
Edward Pygge	Ian Hamilton, John Fuller, Clive James, Russell Davies	
Edwin Caskoden	Charles Major	
Egor Don	Eugene Gordon (writer)	African-American journalist
Effie Johnson	E. J. Richmond	American author
Elaine	Kate Simpson Hayes	Canadian playwright, author, journalist, poet
Eleanor Kirk	Eleanor Maria Easterbrook Ames	19th-century American writer
Eleanor Putnam	Harriet Bates	19th-century American poet, novelist
Elena Ferrante	unknown	Italian novelist
Eleonore von Münster	Eleonore von Grothaus	18th-century German writer
Elia	Charles Lamb	The pen name Lamb used as a contributor to The London Magazine
Eliza	Elizabeth Carter	English poet, classicist, writer, translator, linguist, polymath
Elizabeth Peters	Barbara Mertz	
Ellen Burroughs	Sophie Jewett	American poet, translator, and professor
Ellery Queen	Frederic Dannay and Manfred B. Lee	20th-century detective fiction
Ellis Bell	Emily Brontë	
Ellis Peters	Edith Pargeter	
Elma South	Essie B. Cheesborough	19th-century prolific American writer
Elsa Triolet	Elsa Kagan	
Elsie J. Oxenham	Elsie Jeanette Dunkerley	
Em Kol Chai	Chava Shapiro	
Emanuel Morgan	Witter Bynner	Co-author of Spectra: A Book of Poetic Experiments
Emil Sinclair	Hermann Hesse	Demian was originally published under this pseudonym.
Émile Ajar	Romain Gary	French author; only author to win the Prix Goncourt twice, once under his real name, and once under his pen name
Emilia Serrano de Wilson	Emilia Serrano y García	Spanish writer, journalist, feminist, traveler
Emily Hawthorne	Emily Thornton Charles	19th-century American poet, journalist, editor, newspaper founder
Emily Rodda	Jennifer Rowe	Australian children's fantasy author; published crime fiction for adults under her own name; also writes under the alias Mary-Ann Dickinson
Emma Lathen	Mary Jane Latsis and Martha Henissart	Economist/lawyer team write humorous banking mysteries with global scope
Ena Fitzgerald	Georgina Fitzgerald-Galaher MacMillan	Edwardian era English novelist, poet, short story writer
Enna Duval	Anne Hampton Brewster	
Eric Iverson	Harry Turtledove	
Erich Maria Remarque	Erich Paul Remark	
Erin Hunter	Kate Cary, Cherith Baldry, and Victoria Holmes	Authors of the fantasy novel series Warriors
Erle Douglas	Eliza D. Keith	American educator, suffragist, journalist
Eulalie	Mary Eulalie Fee Shannon	19th-century American poet, short story writer
Euphrosyne	Julia Nyberg	
Eva	Fanny Tuxen	19th-century Danish writer
Eva G.	Eva Griffith Thompson	American newspaper editor

== F ==
Pen name	Real name	Details
Fan-Fan	F. Burge Griswold	19th-century American author
Fanny Clar	Clara Fanny Olivier	French journalist, writer
Fatti Burke	Kathi Burke	Irish illustrator
Fernán Caballero	Cecilia Böhl de Faber	Spanish author
Fidelitas	Anna Blackwell	19th-century British writer, journalist, translator
Filia Ecclesia	Mary Elizabeth Beauchamp	British-born American educator, author
Flann O'Brien	Brian O'Nolan	
Florio	Fanny Purdy Palmer	American author, poet, journalist, lecturer, social activist, clubwoman
Floyd Bentley	Sarah Dyer Hobart	American poet, author
Ford Madox Ford	Ford Hermann Hueffer	Early 20th-century English novelist and poet
Frances Brody	Frances McNeil	
Francis Bennett	Edwin Keppel Bennett	
Frank Dashmore	Fanny Murdaugh Downing	19th-century American author, poet
Franklin W. Dixon	Leslie McFarlane	20th-century Canadian writer was the first of a variety of different authors to use this pen name for The Hardy Boys novels
Françoise Sagan	Françoise Quoirez	

== G ==
Pen name	Real name	Details
Gisèle d'Estoc	Marie-Paule Alice Courbe	19th-century French writer, sculptor, feminist
Gabriela Mistral	Lucila Godoy Alcayaga	Chilean poet, educator, diplomat, and feminist who was the first Latin American to win the Nobel Prize for Literature, in 1945
Gabrielle Réval	Gabrielle Élise Victoire Logerot	French novelist, essayist
Gale Forest	Emma May Alexander Reinertsen	American writer, social reformer
Garth Godfrey	Agnes Leonard Hill	American journalist, author, poet, newspaper founder and publisher, evangelist, social reformer
Geoffrey Crayon	Washington Irving	Used when publishing The Sketch Book of Geoffrey Crayon, Gent.
George Eliot	Mary Ann Evans	19th-century English novelist
George Groth	Martin Gardner	Criticized Gardner's The Whys of a Philosophical Scrivener
George Orwell	Eric Arthur Blair	20th-century British author and essayist
George Sand	Amandine Lucie Aurore Dupin	19th-century French novelist and early feminist
Georges Courteline	Georges Victor Marcel Moinaux	
Gérard de Nerval	Gérard Labrunie	19th-century French poet, essayist and translator
Gerald Wiley	Ronnie Barker	
Geronimo Stilton	Elisabetta Dami	Author of the Geronimo Stilton series; Geronimo Stilton is the title character in the series
Gertrude Glenn	Mary Ware	American "southland" poet, prose writer
Gertrude St. Orme	Annie McCarer Darlington	American poet
Glaslwyn	Daniel Owen	Welsh novelist. Generally regarded as the foremost Welsh-language novelist of the 19th century
Grace Goodhouse	Evalena Fryer Hedley	American journalist, editor, and author
Grace Greenwood	Sara Jane Lippincott	American author, poet, correspondent, lecturer, newspaper founder
Grace Shirley	Lurana W. Sheldon	American novelist, poet, lecturer, editor
Graham R. Tomson	Rosamund Marriott Watson	British poet and critic
Grant Naylor	Rob Grant and Doug Naylor	Late 20th-century creators of the science fiction-sitcom, Red Dwarf
Guillaume Apollinaire	Wilhelm Albert Włodzimierz Apolinary Kostrowicki	20th-century French poet, writer, and art critic
Gulzar	Sampooran Singh Kalra	Noted Indian poet, lyricist, director, and playwright, who works primarily in Hindi and Urdu languages
Gun Buster	John Charles Austin and Richard Campion Austin	Father and son team who wrote a series of books about British exploits in World War II
Guy Cullingford	Constance Lindsay Taylor	20th-century British mystery author and screenwriter

== H ==
Pen name	Real name	Details
H.D.	Hilda Doolittle	20th-century American imagist poet, novelist and memoirist
H.E. Sayeh	Hushang Ebtehaj	20th-century Iranian poet (هوشنگ ابتهاج)
H. E. P.	Harriet Pritchard Arnold	19th-century American author
H. M. M.	Helen Merrill Egerton	20th-century Canadian author
H. Maery or Helen Maery	Mary Theodosia Mug	19th- and 20th-century American nun, author, poet, and composer
H. N. Turtletaub	Harry Turtledove	
H. T. C.	Helen Taggart Clark	American journalist, poet
Hagar	Jennie Phelps Purvis	American writer; California pioneer
Hajime Yatate	various	Pen name of Sunrise animation staff members
Hans Fallada	Rudolf Wilhelm Friedrich Ditzen	German writer
Hard Pan	Geraldine Bonner	
Harold Robbins	Harold Rubin	
Havank	Hans van der Kallen	
Henri Ardel	Berthe Abraham	French writer
Henri Gordon	Clara M. Brinkerhoff	19th-century British soprano and romance novelist
Henriett Seth F.	Fajcsák Henrietta	
Henriette Hardenberg	Margarete Rosenberg	
Henry Chalgrain	Harlette Hayem	French woman of letters who wrote literary articles and poetry
Henry Handel Richardson	Ethel Florence Lindesay Richardson	Early 20th-century Australian author
Henry Wade	Sir Henry Aubrey-Fletcher, 6th Baronet	British mystery writer (1887-1969)
Herblock	Herbert Lawrence Block	20th-century political cartoonist
Hergé	Georges Remi	20th-century Belgian cartoonist and creator of The Adventures of Tintin
Hermance	Hermine Lanctôt	Canadian author, journalist, and schoolteacher
Hero Strong	Clara Augusta Jones Trask	19th-century American dime-novelist
H. K. Challoner	Janet Melanie Ailsa Mills	English theosophist, healer, writer and clerk
H. Bustos Domecq	Jorge Luis Borges and Adolfo Bioy Casares	20th-century Argentine writers
Hugh Conway	Frederick John Fargus	
Humphrey Ploughjogger	John Adams	2nd US president and Founding Father (1735-1826)
Hugh MacDiarmid	C M Grieve	Scottish Renaissance poet

== I ==
Pen name	Real name	Details
I. McC. Wilson	Ibbie McColm Wilson	American poet
Ian Maclaren	Rev John Watson	Scottish author and theologian
Ianthe	Emma Catherine Embury	19th-century American author, poet
Ibn Warraq	various	Pen name has traditionally been adopted by dissident authors throughout the history of Islam, including a current writer from India
Iceberg Slim	Robert Beck	African American writer
Ida Fairfield	Mary Bassett Clarke	19th-century American writer
Ida Glenwood	Cynthia Roberts Gorton	19th-century blind American poet, author
Ide Delmar	Essie B. Cheesborough	19th-century American writer
Ilkka Remes	Petri Pykälä	20th- and 21st-century Finnish writer
Ilya Ilf	Ilya Arnoldovich Faynzilberg	Soviet journalist and writer of Jewish origin
Inez	Frances Laughton Mace	19th-century American poet
Ion Barbu	Dan Barbilian	20th-century Romanian poet and mathematician
Iota	Dorothy Ann Thrupp	19th-century British Psalmist, hymnwriter, translator
Irmari Rantamala	Algot Untola	20th-century Finnish author
Irwin Shaw	Irwin Shamforoff	
Isak Dinesen	Karen Blixen	20th-century Danish author of Out of Africa and Babette's Feast
Isola	Mrs. Bartle Teeling	Guernsey writer
Italo Svevo	Aron Ettore Schmitz	
Iyanla Vanzant	Rhonda Eva Harris	Author, spiritual teacher, and television personality

== J ==
Pen name	Real name	Details
J. D. Robb	Nora Roberts	
J. E. McConaughy	Julia Eliza McConaughy	19th-century American litterateur and author of religious literature
J. F. O'Donnell	Jessie Fremont O'Donnell	19th-century American writer
J. I. Vatanen	Algot Untola	20th-century Finnish author
J. K. Mayo	William Watson	Scottish author of spy thrillers
J. K. Rowling	Joanne Rowling	British author of the Harry Potter books
J. T.	Jeanette Threlfall	British hymnwriter, poet
Jack Kirby	Jacob Kurtzberg	Comic book pioneer
Jack the Ripper	unknown	Victorian serial killer, author of Dear Boss letter and From Hell letter
James Dillinger	James Robert Baker	
James Herriot	James Alfred Wight	20th-century British writer
James S. A. Corey	Daniel Abraham and Ty Franck	Authors of the science fiction series The Expanse
James Tiptree Jr.	Alice Bradley Sheldon	20th-century science fiction author
Jane Somers	Doris Lessing	The Diaries of Jane Somers: The Diary of a Good Neighbor and If The Old Could
Janet Grant	Mary Catherine Crowley	American writer
Janez Janša (visual artist), Janez Janša (director), and Janez Janša (performance artist)	various	Pen name used by three contemporary artists who changed their names in 2007 to the name of the Slovenian right-wing politician
Jay Livingston	Jacob Harold Levison	
Jean D'Anin	Marie Léra	French journalist, novelist, translator
Jean Kincaid	Estelle M. H. Merrill	American journalist, editor
Jean de La Brète	Alice Cherbonnel	French novelist
Jean de Lutry	Jeanine Delpech	French journalist, translator, novelist
Jean Paul	Johann Paul Friedrich Richter	
Jean Plaidy	Eleanor Hibbert	
Jean Ray	Raymundus Joannes de Kremer	
Jehu O'Cataract	John Neal	Pen name given to the author by fellow Delphian Club members
Jemyma	Marietta Holley	American humorist
Jennie Woodbine	Annie R. Blount	American poet, short story writer, and newspaper editor
Jennie Crayon	Emily Lee Sherwood Ragan	American author, journalist
Jeremy Bishop	Jeremy Robinson	
Jin Yong	Louis Cha Leung-yung	20th-century Chinese-language novelist
Joan Ure	Elizabeth Thoms Clark	Scottish poet and playwright
Joe Hill	Joseph Hillstrom King	
Johann Joachim Sautscheck	Roman Turovsky-Savchuk	
Johannes Linnankoski	Vihtori Johan Peltonen	
Johannes de silentio	Søren Kierkegaard	
Johannes Vares Barbarus	Johannes Vares	
John Beynon	John Wyndham Parkes Lucas Beynon Harris	Post-apocalyptic British science fiction writer
John Christopher	Samuel Youd	
John G. Andrews	Emma Huntington Nason	American poet, author, musical composer
John Hill	Dean Koontz	
John Lange	Michael Crichton	20th-century science fiction author
John le Carré	David John Moore Cornwell	20th-century British writer
John O'Cataract	John Neal	Used to publish Battle of Niagara, a Poem, without Notes; and Goldau, or the Maniac Harper
John Sedges	Pearl S. Buck	Author of "The Townsman"
John Wyndham	John Wyndham Parkes Lucas Beynon Harris	Post-apocalyptic British science fiction writer
Johny Hunt	Margaret Hunt Brisbane	American poet
Jonathan Oldstyle	Washington Irving	Author of Letters of Jonathan Oldstyle, Gent.
Joseph Conrad	Józef Teodor Konrad Korzeniowski	20th-century Polish-British author
Joseph Howard	Paul Rudnick	Screenwriting credit for Sister Act; he refused to have his real name associated with it
Josephine Tey	Elizabeth MacKintosh	20th-century British writer, who also used the pseudonym "Gordon Daviot"
Judith Jorgenson	Ella Hamilton Durley	Late 19th/early 20th-c American educator, newspaper editor, journalist
Juhani Tervapää	Hella Wuolijoki	20th-century Estonian-born Finnish writer
Julia Quinn	Julia Pottinger	
Julien Gordon	Julia Cruger	American novelist
Justitia	Emily Parmely Collins	American suffragist, activist, writer

== K ==
Pen name	Real name	Details
K. Hardesh	Clement Greenberg	20th-century American art critic
Kamba Thorpe	Elizabeth Whitfield Croom Bellamy	19th-century American author
Karl Rene Moore	A. R. Morlan	American novelist and short story writer
Kate Cleaveland	Rebecca S. Nichols	19th-century American poet
Kate Elliott	Alis A. Rasmussen	20th/21st-century fantasy author
Ka-Tsetnik 135633	Yehiel De-Nur	
Kennilworthy Whisp	Joanne Rowling (J. K. Rowling)	Used for the publication of Quidditch Through the Ages, from the Harry Potter universe
Kir Bulychov	Igor Vsevolodovich Mozheiko (Игорь Всеволодович Можейко)	20th-century Russian science fiction writer and historian
Korney Chukovsky	Nikolay Vasilyevich Korneychukov	
Kozma Prutkov	Aleksey Konstantinovich Tolstoy, Aleksey Zhemchuzhnikov, and two others	Collective name who published in Sovremennik during 1836–1866
Kurban Said	disputed	Author of Ali and Nino, a novel originally published in 1937

== L ==
Pen name	Real name	Details
L.	Lois Bryan Adams	19th-century American writer; newspaper editor/proprietor
L. H. S.	Lucinda Hinsdale Stone	19th-century American feminist, educator, traveler, writer, philanthropist
L. M. N.	Maria Frances Anderson	19th-century French-born American hymnwriter and writer
La Muse Limonadière	Charlotte Bourette	18th-century French poet, playwright and lemonade seller
Laong Laan	José Rizal	
Laura	Josefa Antonia Perdomo y Heredia	19th-century Dominican poet
Laura	María del Pilar Sinués de Marco	prolific 19th-century Spanish writer of novels, poems, and non-fiction; newspaper editor
Lauren Kelly	Joyce Carol Oates	Author of Blood Mask, The Stolen Heart, and Take Me, Take Me With You
Lazlo Toth	Don Novello	Author of the satiric The Lazlo Letters and other books; the name was taken from that of a deranged Hungarian-born Australian man named Laszlo Toth who vandalized Michelangelo's statue Pieta in Rome
Leigh Nichols	Dean Koontz	
Lemony Snicket	Daniel Handler	Author of A Series of Unfortunate Events
Lena	Mary Torrans Lathrap	19th-century American poet, preacher, suffragist, social reformer
Lenora	Lou Singletary Bedford	19th-century American poet, author, editor
Leoline	Emma B. Dunham	American poet, teacher
Leslie Charteris	Leslie Charles Bowyer-Yin	Half-Chinese, half-English author of primarily mystery fiction such as the Simon Templar series
Lester del Rey	Leonard Knapp	American science fiction author and editor
Lewis Allan	Abel Meeropol	
Lewis Armytage	Rose Mabel Lewis	19th-century Welsh writer and suffragist
Lewis Carroll	Charles Lutwidge Dodgson	19th-century British author, mathematician, Anglican clergyman, logician, and amateur photographer, author of Alice's Adventures in Wonderland
Lewis Padgett	Henry Kuttner and C. L. Moore	American husband and wife science fiction authors
Lewis Grassic Gibbon	James Leslie Mitchell	20th-century Scottish novelist
Lewtrah	Mary Hartwell Catherwood	19th-century American writer
Liisan-Antti ja Jussi Porilainen	Algot Untola	20th-century Finnish author
Lisa Ben	Edythe D. Eyde	20th-century American author
L'Inconnue	Lucy Virginia French	19th-century American author
Lizzie M. Boynton	Elizabeth Boynton Harbert	19th-century American author, lecturer, reformer philanthropist
Lobsang Rampa	Cyril Henry Hoskin	The author of The Third Eye, supposedly authentic autobiography of a monk born in Tibet, who was unmasked as a British plumber that decided in 1958 to write the bestseller
Lorenzo Da Ponte	Emmanuele Conegliano	
Louis-Ferdinand Céline	Louis-Ferdinand Destouches	
Louis Hammond Willis	Louise Hammond Willis Snead	American writer, lecturer, artist
Lu Xun	Zhou Shuren	20th-century Chinese writer and cultural critic
Lucas Parkes	John Wyndham Parkes Lucas Beynon Harris	Post-apocalyptic British science fiction writer
Lucile	Lucinda Barbour Helm	American author, editor, women's religious activist
Lucrece	Cora Linn Daniels	American author
Luisa Cappiani	Luisa Kapp-Young	Austrian soprano, musical educator, essayist
Lydia Koidula	Lydia Emilie Florentine Jannsen	

== M ==
Pen name	Real name	Details
M. C. G.	Mary C. Billings	19th-century American writer, activist, hymn writer, evangelist, missionary
M. E. C. Bates	Martha Elizabeth Cram Bates	American writer, journalist, newspaper editor
M. E. W.	Marion E. Warner	American poet and short story writer
M. R. M.	Mary Rootes Thornton McAboy	19th-century American poet
M. S. Pine	Mary Paulina Finn	19th- and 20th-century nun, playwright, poet, author, and English teacher
M. X. L.	Molly Lyons Bar-David	20th-century cookbook author
M. Barnard Eldershaw	Marjorie Barnard and Flora Eldershaw	
M. Wintermute	Martha Wintermute	American author, poet
Maarten Maartens	Jozua Marius Willem van der Poorten Schwartz	
Mabel Percy	Mary R. P. Hatch	19th-century American writer
Mabelle	Hannah Tobey Farmer	19th-century American writer, philanthropist, social reformer
Maddox	George Ouzounian	American author known for his website The Best Page in the Universe
Madhur Piya	Gokulotsavji Maharaj	Indian classical vocalist, composer
Mackenzi Lee	MacKenzie Van Engelenhoven	American young adult fantasy author
Madeleine Brent	Peter O'Donnell	
Maiju Lassila	Algot Untola	20th-century Finnish author
Maironis	Jonas Mačiulis	
Mao Dun	Shen Dehong	20th-century Chinese novelist, cultural critic, and journalist
Marc Hélys	Marie Léra	French journalist, novelist, translator
Margaret Allston	Anna Farquhar Bergengren	American writer, editor
Margaret Frances	Frances Margaret Milne	Irish-born American author, librarian
Margaret Vandegrift	Margaret Thomson Janvier	American poet and children's book writer
Margaret Wynman	Ella Hepworth Dixon	English author, editor
Margret Holmes Bates	Martha Mary Viktoria Ernsperger Bates	American author
Marguerite	Jessie Margaret King	19th-century Scottish essayist, journalist, poet
Mariya Princess Nizharadze	Maria Vega	Russian poet, artist and translator
Marian Douglas	Annie Douglas Green Robinson	American poet and short story writer
Marie Norman	Mary E. Ireland	American author, translator
Marion Howard	Marion Howard Brazier	American journalist, author
Marion Lisle	Mary Stebbins Savage	American writer, poet
Mark Brandis	Nikolai von Michalewsky	
Mark Twain	Samuel Langhorne Clemens	19th-century American humorist, author, and lecturer
Marka Wohl	Kate Simpson Hayes	Canadian playwright, author, journalist, poet
Martha Careful	Benjamin Franklin	
Marton Taiga	Martti Löfberg	20th-century Finnish pulp writer, who also used several other pseudonym
Mary Doyle	Mary Evelyn Hitchcock	American author, explorer
Mary Hartwell	Mary Hartwell Catherwood	19th-century American writer
Mary A. Holmes	Georgie A. Hulse McLeod	19th-century American author, hymnwriter
Mary Markwell	Kate Simpson Hayes	Canadian playwright, author, journalist, poet
Mary Westmacott	Agatha Christie	20th-century British writer who wrote some of her works under this pseudonym
Matthew Bramble	Andrew Macdonald	Scottish clergyman, poet and playwright
Mattie May	Martha Pearson Smith	American poet, musician
Maurice Kildare	Gladwell Richardson	20th-century American writer of Old West folklore
Max Halstock	James Leasor	20th-century British writer
Max Stirner	Johann Kaspar Schmidt	19th-century German philosopher
Maxwell Grant	Primarily Walter B. Gibson, shared with Theodore Tinsley, Bruce Elliott and Lester Dent	Author of The Shadow pulp novellas
May Miller	Maria Dolores Acevedo	Spanish romance and western writer
Maya Angelou	Marguerite Annie Johnson	African American poet, memoirist, and civil rights activist
Meg	Mary Temple Bayard	American writer, journalist
Mencius Moldbug	Curtis Yarvin	21st-century political theorist
Mercedes	Katherine Eleanor Conway	Editor-in-chief of The Pilot
Mercurius Oxoniensis	Hugh Trevor-Roper	Historian, Master of Peterhouse, Cambridge, and author of the pseudonymous Letters of Mercurius Oxoniensis to his 'brother' Londiniensis which appeared in the Spectator Magazine 1970–71 and later in book form
Michael Arlen	Dikran Kuyumjian	
Michael Innes	J. I. M. Stewart	
Michael Serafian	Malachi Martin	
Migjeni	Millosh Gjergj Nikolla	20th-century Albanian poet
Miles Amber	Ellen Melicent Cobden	British writer, radical campaigner and suffragist
Miles Standish	Lelia P. Roby	American writer
Minnie C. Ballard	Mary Canfield Ballard	19th-century American poet, hymnwriter
Minnie Mary Lee	Julia Amanda Sargent Wood	19th-century American author
Minnie Myrtle Miller	Theresa Dyer	19th-century American author
Miosotis	Francesca Torrent	Spanish writer, poet
Miranda	Mathilde Alanic	French writer of sentimental novels and short stories
Miss Manners	Judith Martin	Author, columnist, and etiquette authority
Missouri Williams	Heather Williams	Novelist, playwright and editor
Mizpah	Mildred A. Bonham	19th-century American traveler and journalist
Moina	Anna Peyre Dinnies	19th-century American poet, miscellaneous writer
Molière	Jean Baptiste Poquelin	17th-century French theatre writer, director and actor, and writer of comic satire
Mollie Myrtle	Agnes Leonard Hill	American journalist, author, poet, newspaper founder and publisher, evangelist, social reformer
Mother Goose	Jeannette H. Walworth	19th-century American novelist, journalist
Motte Hall	Essie B. Cheesborough	19th-century prolific American writer
Mr. Blackwell	Richard Sylvan Selzer	Fashion critic, journalist, creator of annual "Ten Worst Dressed Women List", also used the alias "Richard Blackwell"
Mr. Fowler	Sarah Morgan Dawson	newspaper editorial writer and diarist
Mrs. A. Elmore	Ann Morrison Moore	American writer, editor, activist, philanthropist
Mrs. Alex. McVeigh Miller	Mittie Frances Clarke Point	American dime-novelist
Mrs. Alfred Barnard	Frances Catherine Barnard	19th-century English writer, poet, playwright
Mrs. B. C. Rude	Ellen Sergeant Rude	American poet, author, temperance reformer
Mrs. Benjamin H. Craig	Cola Barr Craig	American novelist and short story writer
Mrs. Chapman Coleman	Ann Mary Butler Crittenden Coleman	19th-century American author, translator
Mrs. Clarissa Packard	Caroline Howard Gilman	19th-century American author
Mrs. E. Burke Collins	Emma Augusta Sharkey	19th-century American dime novelist
Mrs. F. Berger Moran	Jeannie Blackburn Moran	American novelist
Mrs. Findley Braden	Anna Braden	American poet, author, editor
Mrs. Francis Rye	Amy Louisa Rye	British-born Canadian writer, social reformer
Mrs. George Archibald	Anna Campbell Palmer	American author, editor
Mrs. George W. Coleman	Alice Blanchard Coleman	American missionary society leader; periodical literature writer
Mrs. H	Anna Morris Holstein	American civil war nurse, author, organizational founder
Mrs. H. E. G. Arey	Harriett Ellen Grannis Arey	19th-century American educator, author, editor, publisher
Mrs. J. C. Bateham	Josephine Cushman Bateham	American editor, writer
Mrs. J. T. Gracey	Annie Ryder Gracey	American writer, missionary
Mrs. James Gray	Mary Ann Browne	British poet, writer of musical scores
Mrs. Madeline Leslie	Harriette Newell Woods Baker	19th-century American novelist, religious writer
Mrs. Manners	Cornelia Holroyd Bradley Richards	19th-century American writer
Mrs. Nathaniel Conklin	Jennie Maria Drinkwater Conklin	19th-century American author and social activist
Mrs. S. L. Baldwin	Esther E. Baldwin	American missionary, teacher, translator, writer, editor
Mrs. Thaddeus Horton	Corinne Stocker Horton	American writer, editor
Mrs. Wilbur F. Crafts	Sara Jane Crafts	American writer, educator, social reformer
Mrs. William Maude	Sophie Dora Spicer Maude	British novelist, writer
Mrs. William Starr Dana	Frances Theodora Parsons	19th-century American nature writer
Multatuli	Eduard Douwes Dekker	Dutch writer known for his satirical novel, Max Havelaar (1860)
Murray Leinster	William Fitzgerald Jenkins	20th-century science fiction author

== N ==
Pen name	Real name	Details
N. W. Clerk	C. S. Lewis	Used when publishing A Grief Observed
Nancy Boyd	Edna St. Vincent Millay	
Natsume Sōseki	Natsume Kinnosuke	Early 20th-century Japanese novelist
Nellie A. Mann	Helen Adelia Manville	19th-century American poet, litterateur
Neville Shute	Neville Norway	British novelist
Newt Scamander	Joanne Rowling (J. K. Rowling)	Used for the publication of Fantastic Beasts and Where to Find Them, from the Harry Potter universe
Nicci French	Nicci Gerard and Sean French	British crime fiction team
Nicolas Blake	Cecil Day-Lewis	Poet Laureate of the U.K., 20 mysteries written as Nicolas Blake
Nicolas Bourbaki	various	A group of mainly French 20th-century mathematicians
Nimrod	Charles James Apperley	19th-century author of The Chase, The Road, and The Turf (on foxhunting, coaching and racing respectively)
Nina Gray Clarke	Mary H. Gray Clarke	19th-century American author, correspondent, poet
Nino Culotta	John O'Grady	Australian writer
Nisa	Nicola Salerno	Italian lyricist
Norman Stuart	Mrs. Bartle Teeling	Guernsey writer
Novalis	Georg Philipp Friedrich Freiherr von Hardenberg	

== O ==
Pen name	Real name	Details
O. Henry	William Sydney Porter	American author of short stories and novels
Octavia Hensel	Mary Alice Fonda	19th-century American musician, author, elocutionist, critic
Ogdred Weary	Edward Gorey	
Olive Thorne	Harriet Mann Miller	American author, naturalist, ornithologist
Olivie Blake	Alexene Farol Follmuth	American author
Onoto Watanna	Winnifred Eaton	Canadian author
Ouida	Marie Louise de la Ramée	19th-century English novelist
Owen West	Dean Koontz	

== P ==
Pen name	Real name	Details
P. Albane	Pauline Cassin Caro	19th-century French novelist
P. L. Travers	Helen Goff	Writer of the Mary Poppins series
P. Mustapää	Martti Haavio	20th-century Finnish poet
Pablo Neruda	Ricardo Eliecer Neftalí Reyes Basoalto	20th-century Chilean poet, Nobel laureate
Pat Frank	Harry Hart Frank	20th-century author of the apocalyptic novel Alas, Babylon
Patience Strong	Winifred Emma May	20th-century English poet
Paul Annixter	Howard Allison Sturtzel	
Paul Celan	Paul Antschel	
Paul Éluard	Eugène Grindel	20th-century French Dada and Surrealist poet
Paul French	Isaac Asimov	U.S. science fiction author, when publishing the Lucky Starr series of novels
Paul Veronique	Elizabeth Marney Conner	19th-century American writer, founder of the Buffalo School of Elocution
Pauline Periwinkle	S. Isadore Miner	American journalist, poet, teacher, feminist
Pauline Réage	Anne Desclos	20th-century French author and critic who wrote Story of O
Peg Woffington	Eve Brodlique	British-born Canadian/American author, journalist
Sònia	Antònia Abelló	Spanish journalist, writer
Peggy Pond Church	Margaret Hallett Pond	American author, poet
Percy Larkin	Fannie B. Damon	American writer, magazine editor
Perez Hilton	Mario Armando Lavandeira Jr.	Celebrity blogger and gossip columnist
Peter Gast	Heinrich Köselitz	
Peter MacAlan	Peter Berresford Ellis	20th-century British novelist
Peter Tremayne	Peter Berresford Ellis	20th-century British novelist
Peter Warlock	Philip Arnold Heseltine	20th-century British composer
Petresia Peters	Julia Carter Aldrich	American author
Peyo	Pierre Culliford	20th-century creator of The Smurfs comics
Philemon	Betsy Perk	Dutch author, a pioneer of the Dutch women's movement
Philip Guston	Phillip Goldstein	
Pierre Delecto	Mitt Romney	American politician and businessman, when using a secret Twitter account in 2019
Pierre Guérande	Hermine Lecomte du Noüy	French novelist, playwright
Pierre Loti	Louis Marie Julien Viaud	
Pierre Moustiers	Pierre Rossi	French writer, laureate of the 1969 Grand prix du roman de l'Académie française
Piers Anthony	Piers Anthony Dillingham Jacob	
Pisanus Fraxi	Henry Spencer Ashbee	19th-century book collector, writer, bibliographer, and author of a three-volume bibliography of erotic literature
Pittacus Lore	James Frey, Jobie Hughes, and Greg Boose	Authors of the Lorien Legacies series; Pittacus Lore is also a character in the series
Plaridel	Marcelo H. del Pilar	Filipino writer, lawyer, journalist, freemason, and propagandist
Polly	Emma Sheridan Fry	American actor, playwright, teacher
Polly Baker	Benjamin Franklin	
Premchand	Dhanpat Rai Srivastav	Indian author, notable for his modern Hindustani literature
Probus	Nancy H. Adsit	19th-century American art lecturer, art educator, writer
Publius	Alexander Hamilton, James Madison, and John Jay	Writers of The Federalist Papers
Publius Decius Mus	Michael Anton	21st-century American conservative
Professor X	unknown	21st-century author of In the Basement of the Ivory Tower
Pseudonymous Bosch	Raphael Simon	Author of The Secret Series, fictional children's books

== Q ==
Pen name	Real name	Details
Q	Arthur Quiller-Couch	Late 19th- and early 20th-century British author, poet, and literary critic
Quinn Fawcett	Chelsea Quinn Yarbro and Bill Fawcett	American mystery authors
Quino	Joaquín Salvador Lavado	Argentine cartoonist (Mafalda)

== R ==
Pen name	Real name	Details
Raccoona Sheldon	Alice Bradley Sheldon (James Tiptree Jr.)	20th-century science fiction author
Raoul Duke	Hunter S. Thompson	Partially fictionalized author surrogate main character for many of his works
Rachel Bach	Rachel Aaron	American science fiction author
Rafael Luna	Matilde Cherner	Spanish novelist, dramatist, literary critic, and journalist
Refugitta	Constance Cary Harrison	American writer
Regina Frohberg	Rebecca Friedländer	German novelist and short-story writer
Rehmat Farrukhabadi	Muhammad Rehmatullah Qureshi	Author and Muslim scholar
Renada-Laura Portet	Renada-Laura Calmon-Ouillet	French Northern Catalonia writer and linguist
Renee M. Charles	A. R. Morlan	American novelist and short story writer
Rhys Bowen	Janet Quin-Harkin	British mystery writer
Richard Bachman	Stephen King	Contemporary American horror author
Richard Hackstaff	Lurana W. Sheldon	American novelist, poet, lecturer, editor
Richard Leander	Richard von Volkmann	
Richard Paige	Dean Koontz	
Richard Saunders	Benjamin Franklin	The "Poor Richard" of Poor Richard's Almanack
Richard Stark	Donald E. Westlake	Westlake used many other pen names as well
Ridinghood	Mary V. Tingley Lawrence	American journalist, writer
Robert Beauchamp	Jeanine Delpech	French journalist, translator, novelist
Robert Galbraith	Joanne Rowling (J. K. Rowling)	Used for the publication of The Cuckoo's Calling
Robert Garioch	Robert Garioch Sutherland	20th-century Scots poet
Robert Jordan	James Oliver Rigney Jr.	Author of the bestselling The Wheel of Time fantasy series
Robert Markham	Kingsley Amis	
Robert Tressell	Robert Croker	
Robert O. Saber	Milton K. Ozaki	Mid-20th-century journalist, author and detective novelist (Dressed to Kill (1954) and many others)
Robin A Hood	Ernest Aris	
Robin Hobb	Margaret Astrid Lindholm Ogden	20th-century fantasy author; also published under the pen name Megan Lindholm
Robin Red	Ethel Hillyer Harris	American author, including negro dialect and pathetic sketches
Roger Fairbairn	John Dickson Carr	
Romain Gary	Romain Kacew	
Rosa del Valle	Mercedes González Tola	Ecuadorian poet, library director and feminist
Rosamond Smith	Joyce Carol Oates	Novels include Nemesis, Lives of the Twins, Soul Mate, Starr Bright Will Be With You Soon, The Barrens, Snake Eyes, You Can't Catch Me, Kindred Passions, and Double Delight
Rosemary Edghill	eluki bes shahar	American writer and editor of science fiction and fantasy
Ross Franklyn	Frank Hardy	Left-wing Australian writer best known for his novel Power Without Glory
Rushworth Armytage	Rosamund Marriott Watson	British poet and critic
Ruth	Rhoda A. Esmond	American writer, philanthropist, temperance leader
Ruth Ogden	Fannie Ogden Ide	American children's book author

== S ==
Pen name	Real name	Details
S. S. Van Dine	Willard Huntington Wright	Art critic and author of Philo Vance mysteries
Saint-John Perse	Alexis Saint-Léger Léger	
Saki	Hector Hugh Munro	Early 20th-century British satirist
Sallie M. Bryan	Sarah Morgan Bryan Piatt	19th-century American poet
Salomėja Nėris	Salomėja Bučinskaitė-Bučienė	
Salonina	Francesca Anna Canfield	Early 19th-century American linguist, poet, translator
Samantha Chase	Eileen Buckholtz and Ruth Glick	20th-century American romance novelists
Samantha Spriggins	Helen Maud Merrill	19th-century American litterateur and poet
Sannois	Camille Saint-Saëns	
Sans Souci	Nelly Nichol Marshall	19th-century American "southland" author
Sapper	H. C. McNeile	
Sapphire	Ramona Lofton	21st-century African-American poet and author
Sadie Sensible	Julia Abigail Fletcher Carney	also "Julia", "Minnie May," "Frank Fisher," "Minister's Wife", "Rev. Peter Benson's Daughter"; American educator, poet
Saturn	Eva Best	American writer, newspaper editor, musical composer
Schlehdorn	Friedrich Everling	German lawyer, judge, politician and writer
Shahriar	Mohammad-Hossein Shahriar	Iranian poet, writing in Persian and Azerbaijani
Selene	Hester Dorsey Richardson	American author, genealogist, clubwoman
Shawn Haigins	Ashwin Sanghi	Indian writer of historical fiction thrillers including The Rozabal Line and Chanakya's Chant (Shawn Haigins is an anagram of Ashwin Sanghi)
Sidney Sheldon	Sidney Schechtel	Novelist and television producer; created I Dream of Jeannie television series
Silence Dogood	Benjamin Franklin	Used this pen name to get his work published
Sister Nivedita	Margaret Elizabeth Noble	
Sjón	Sigurjón Birgir Sigurðsson	Icelandic novelist, poet, lyricist
Somebody, M.D.C. &c. &c. &c.	John Neal	Keep Cool was published under this pseudonym. "M.D.C." stands for "Member of the Delphian Club"
Sonya Koshkina	Ksenia Mykytivna Vasilenko	Ukrainian journalist, editor-in-chief
Seth	Gregory Gallant	20th-century Canadian cartoonist
Stan Lee	Stanley Martin Lieber	Comic book pioneer
Stanley Norris	Lurana W. Sheldon	American novelist, poet, lecturer, editor
Steele Rudd	Arthur Hoey Davis	
Stefan Brockhoff	Dieter Cunz, Richard Plant, Oskar Seidlin	
Stein Riverton	Sven Elvestad	Born as Kristoffer Elvestad Svendsen
Stella	Elizabeth Jessup Eames	19th-century American writer
Stendhal	Marie-Henri Beyle	19th-century French writer
Stephen Bury	Neal Stephenson and J. Frederick George	
Student	William Sealy Gosset	Discoverer of Student's t-distribution in statistics
Sue Denim	Dav Pilkey	Writer and illustrator of the Captain Underpants children's book series, when author of the Dumb Bunnies books (Sue Denim is a play on the word pseudonym)
Sue Smith	Rosa Miller Avery	19th-century American abolitionist, reformer, suffragist, writers (also used men's names as pseudonyms)
Sujatha	S. Rangarajan	20th-century Indian writer, engineer/scientist
Sui Sin Far	Edith Maude Eaton	

== T ==
Pen name	Real name	Details
T. H. Lain	Philip Athans and Bruce Cordell	Collective pseudonym used by nine separate authors writing Wizards of the Coast's Dungeons & Dragons novels
T. Kingfisher	Ursula Vernon	
T. M. Maple	Jim Burke	
Ted L. Nancy	Barry Marder and Bruce Baum	Authors of the Letters from a Nut series
Temple Oliver	Jeanie Oliver Davidson Smith	American poet and romanticist
Tess Marlowe	Louise Titchener and Ruth Glick	20th-century American romance novelists
Theodosia	Anne Steele	English hymnwriter, essayist
Thoinot Arbeau	Jehan Tabourot	
Tiger Lily	Lillie Devereux Blake	American suffragist, reformer, writer
Timothy Shy	D. B. Wyndham Lewis	20th-century British poet and author, collaborated with Ronald Searle on The Terror of St Trinian's
Tirso de Molina	Gabriel Téllez	Spanish Baroque dramatist and poet
Tite Kubo	Noriaki Kubo	Manga artist of Bleach
Tom Tomorrow	Dan Perkins	20th-century editorial cartoonist
Toofie Lauder	Maria Elise Turner Lauder	19th-century Canadian teacher, linguist, author
Tori Carrington	Tony Karayianni and Lori Schlachter Karayianni	American husband and wife romance novelists
Trebor Ohl	Cora Stuart Wheeler	19th-century American poet, author
Trevanian	Rodney William Whitaker	20th-century American spy novelist
Tristan Tzara	Sami Rosenstock	
Tsugumi Ohba	unknown	Manga writer, author of Death Note and Bakuman
Tudor Arghezi	Ion N. Theodorescu	20th-century Romanian poet and children's author

== U ==
Pen name	Real name	Details
Uanhenga Xitu	Agostinho André Mendes de Carvalho	
Umberto Saba	Umberto Poli	

== V ==
Pen name	Real name	Details
Uriah Fuller	Martin Gardner	Wrote Confessions of a Psychic
Väinö Stenberg	Algot Untola	20th-century Finnish author
Valeria de León	Carmen de Icaza, 8th Baroness of Claret	20th-century Spanish novelist; used this name in her first work
Vazha	Luka Razikashvili	
Vera Haij	Tove Jansson	Author of the picture book Sara och Pelle och näckens bläckfiskar
Véra Tsaritsyn	Gertrude Elizabeth Blood	Journalist, author, playwright, and editor
Vercors	Jean Bruller	
Vernon Sullivan	Boris Vian	
Víctor Català	Caterina Albert	Author of Solitud (Solitude) (1905)
Victoria Lucas	Sylvia Plath	Poet and author of The Bell Jar
Vladimir Sirin	Vladimir Nabokov	20th-century novelist; used this name on early works
Viola	Fanny Murdaugh Downing	19th-century American author, poet
Viola	Laura M. Hawley Thurston	19th-century American poet, teacher
Voltaire	François-Marie Arouet	18th-century French Enlightenment writer, deist and philosopher

== W ==
Pen name	Real name	Details
Walter Ericson	Howard Fast	American novelist
W. A. C. Q.	Anna Cabot Quincy Waterston	19th-century American poet, novelist, hymnist, diarist
W. N. P. Barbellion	Bruce Frederick Cummings	20th-century diarist
Walter	Henry Spencer Ashbee	19th-century book collector, writer, bibliographer, and suspected author of My Secret Life, the sexual memoirs of a Victorian era gentleman
Wang Shiwei (王實味)	Wang Sidao (王思禱)	20th-century Chinese journalist and literary writer
William Lee	William S. Burroughs	American novelist, short story writer, essayist and spoken word performer
William Penn	Jeremiah Evarts	19th-century activist against Indian removal
Willibald Alexis	Georg Wilhelm Heinrich Haring	
Willice Wharton	Eve Brodlique	British-born Canadian/American author, journalist
Winnie Woodbine	Esther Saville Allen	19th-century American author
Winnie Rover	Mary Catherine Chase	19th-century American Catholic nun and writer
Woody Allen	Heywood Allen (born Allan Stewart Konigsberg)	American film director, writer, actor, and comedian

== X ==
Pen name	Real name	Details
add	add	add

== Y ==
Pen name	Real name	Details
Y. L. E.	Mary Whitwell Hale	19th-century American teacher, hymnwriter
Yevgeny Petrov	Yevgeniy Petrovich Kataev	
Yukio Mishima	Kimitake Hiraoka	20th-century Japanese novelist, essayist, and playwright
Yukon Bill	Kate Simpson Hayes	Canadian playwright, author, journalist, poet

== Z ==
Pen name	Real name	Details
Zeleta	Helen Field Comstock	American poet, philanthropist
Zena Clifton	Lillian Rozell Messenger	American poet
Zig	Eliza Archard Conner	American journalist, lecturer, feminist

== See also ==
- List of pseudonyms
- List of pseudonyms of angling authors
- List of people who adopted matrilineal surnames
- List of novels written by multiple authors
