= Sally Wood =

Sally Wood may refer to:

- Sally Wood (writer) (1759–1855), American novelist
- Sally L. Wood, American engineer
- Sally Elizabeth Wood (1857–1928), Canadian photographer
- Sally Wood, theatrical producer and wife of Ronnie Wood

== See also ==
- Sara Wood (disambiguation)
