= Sara Wood =

Sara(h) Wood may refer to:

- Sara Wood (novelist), British romance novelist
- Sally Wood (writer), born Sarah Wood (1759–1854), American novelist
- Sarah F. Wood, British businesswoman
- Sara Ann Wood (born 1981), an American missing girl who disappeared in 1993

== See also ==
- Sara Woods, pseudonym of Lana Bowden-Judd (1922–1985), British mystery writer
