= Barrell Homestead =

Historic house in Maine, United States

- U.S. National Register of Historic Places
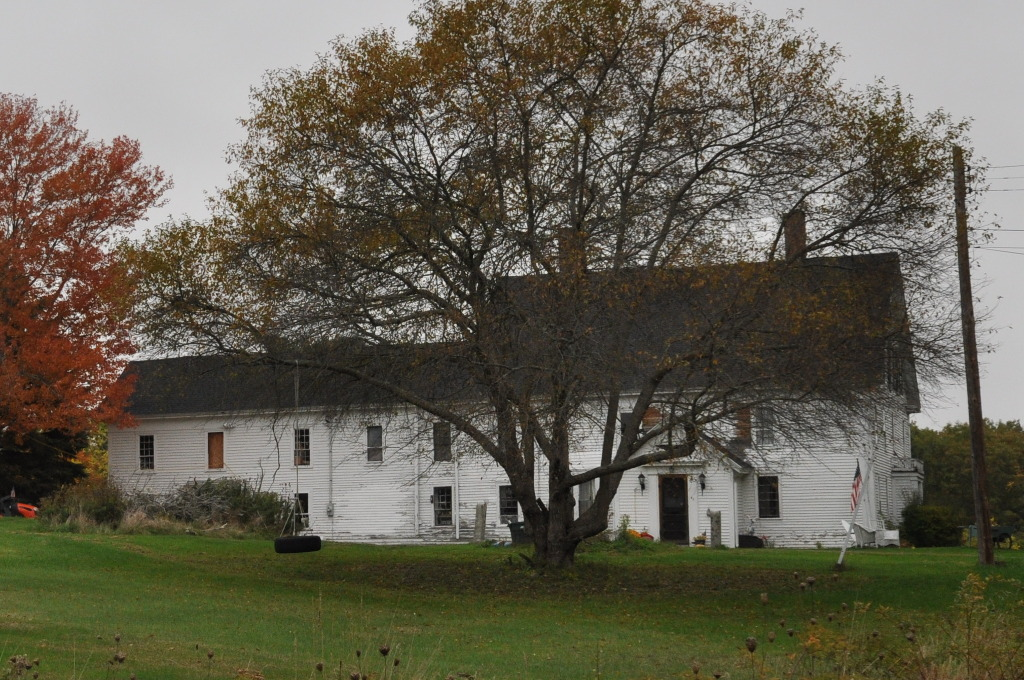

- Location within Maine Location within the United States
- Location: 71 Beech Ridge Road, York, Maine
- Coordinates: 43°8′41″N 70°42′28″W
- Area: 1 acre (0.40 ha)
- Built: 1720
- NRHP reference No.: 76000195
- Added to NRHP: December 12, 1976

The Barrell Homestead is a historic house at 71 Beech Ridge Road in York, Maine, United States. At the core of this three-story house is a c. 1720 late First Period house, which has been in the hands of a single family since 1758. It was home to one of York's most colorful residents of the second half of the 18th century, Nathaniel Barrell. The house was listed on the National Register of Historic Places in 1976.

== Description and history ==
The Barrell Homestead is located on the north side of Beech Ridge Road in south central York, a short way east of its junction with Saltwater Drive. It is a large wood-frame structure, with clapboard siding. The walls rise a full two stories, and a full third floor is found under the south-facing gable roof, with an attic above. The building's corners are pilastered. The south facade is four bays wide, two windows to the left of the entrance and one to its right. There are four windows on the second level, three on the third, and one at the attic level, the upper two levels both within the gable. The entrance projects slightly, and is flanked by sidelight windows. On the west facade is a larger gable-roofed entry projection with more elaborate decoration around the door. An ell extends to the north, flush with the western wall of the main block.

The oldest portion of the house is a rectangular section of the main block, two stories in height, which was built c. 1720 by Matthew Grover, who had purchased the land from one of the area's early proprietors. In 1757 Grover's son mortgaged the property to Jonathan Sayward, one of York County's wealthiest residents. He defaulted on the mortgage the following year, and Sayward foreclosed on the property. This inaugurated ownership by him and his descendants that continued at least through the property's listing on the National Register in 1976. Sayward's daughter Sally married Nathaniel Barrell in 1758, and this couple made it their home. Sally, who was America’s first Gothic novelist, actually sketched the designs herself. Barrell was involved in the colonial militia, serving in the 1758 Battle of the Plains of Abraham, and was politically well-connected, serving the governor's council of the neighboring Province of New Hampshire. During a visit to England in the 1760s he came under the sway of the nonconformist religious teachings of Robert Sandeman, which had repercussions in his family, political, and business relations. His peculiar views caused a number of people to consider him a Tory, resulting in a loss of business. After he denied Jonathan Sayward access to his grandchildren, his father-in-law effectively disinherited him, ensuring the passage of this property would pass through his daughter to his grandson, and that his business interests fell to another. Barrell died in 1831. The couple's oldest daughter, Sally Sayward Barrell, is acknowledged as one of Maine's first female novelists; she published pseudonymously but is best known as Sally Wood.

The house saw only modest alterations until 1841, at which time its main block was enlarged to its present three-story height and roughly square footprint. The ell to the west also dates to this period.

== See also ==
- National Register of Historic Places listings in York County, Maine
