= Marie Lera =

French journalist, novelist, and translator

- Born: Hortense Marie Héliard; 2 June 1864; Saint-Nazaire, France
- Died: 9 October 1958 (aged 94); Bron, France
- Occupations: journalist; novelist; translator
- Spouse: Carlos Americo Léra
- Writing career
- Pen name: Jean D'Anin; Marc Hélys
- Language: French
- Notable work: Le secret des "Désenchantées"

Marie Lera (née, Héliard; pen names, Jean D'Anin and Marc Hélys; 2 June 1864 – 9 October 1958) was a French journalist, novelist, and translator. She is best known for her book, Le secret des "Désenchantées". Lera died in 1958.

== Biography ==
Hortense Marie Héliard was born on June 2nd, 1864 in Saint-Nazaire. From childhood, she was taught English, Italian and, thanks to her nanny, Swedish too.

She started her career in journalism by writing a report on Scandinavia, adopting the pen names "Jean D'Anin" and "Marc Hélys" when publishing her works.

During her two stays in Constantinople, Lera created relationships and spent time with two women, which opened doors for her and helped her understand the ideological debates in regard to Ottoman women. Lera wrote a book, Le jardin fermé, which she presented as a testimony on the condition of women and the events that marked her time in Constantinople, but which in reality was a summary of hearsay punctuated with romantic inventions. Lera was best known for her book, Le secret des "Désenchantées", published under the pseudonym of "Marc Hélys", which described how the literary success of Pierre Loti's Les désenchantées resulted from a deception of which she was one of the authors during her second stay in Constantinople in 1904.

Lera became interested in feminism while in several foreign countries. In 1906, she published À travers le féminisme en Suède (Paris, Plon-Nourrit). She was also a translator (from Italian, English, Swedish, and Polish), using the pseudonym "Jean d'Anin".

Her husband was the Mexican diplomat Carlos Americo Lera. Marie Lera died on 9 October 1958, in Bron.

== Selected works ==
=== As "Marie Lera" ===
- Les Petits Boërs : épisode de la guerre du Transvaal en 1900, 1900

=== As "Jean d'Anin" ===
- Laquelle ? - Collection Stella, no. 107, 1903

=== As "Marc Hélys" ===
- À travers le féminisme suédois, 1906
- Le Jardin fermé, scènes de la vie féminine en Turquie, 1908
- Cantinière de la Croix-Rouge 1914-1916, 1917
- L'Envers d'un roman : Le secret des "Désenchantées" révélé par celle qui fut Djénan, 1923

=== Translations as "Marc Hélys" ===
- Aimé pour lui-même - Collection Stella, no. 22 (French translation of the novel Brewster's Millions, by George Barr McCutcheon) 1902
- Le Vieux Manoir (French translation of a Swedish short story by Selma Lagerlöf)
- Dans le désert (French translation of the Italian novel Sino al confine, by Grazia Deledda), Paris, Hachette, 1912
- Une héroïne de la Renaissance italienne, Caterina Sforza, 1463-1509 (partial French translation of Caterina Sforza, 3 volume edition by the Italian historian, Pier Desiderio Pasolini)
- Des roseaux sous le vent(French translation of the Italian novel Canne al vento, by Grazia Deledda), Paris, Grasset, 1919
- Betty et ses amoureux (French translation of the novel The Two Vanrevels by Booth Tarkington), Paris, Hachette, 1936
