= Essie B. Cheesborough =

American writer

Esther Blythe Cheesborough
- Born: 1826; Charleston, South Carolina, U.S.
- Died: December 29, 1905 (aged 78–79); Charleston
- Other name: Essie
- Occupations: writer; poet
- Writing career
- Pen name: Motte Hall; Elma South; Ide Delmar; E. B. C.
- Genre: contributor to popular periodicals

Essie B. Cheesborough (pen names, Motte Hall, Elma South, Ide Delmar, and E. B. C.; 1826 – December 29, 1905) was an American writer who contributed to several popular periodicals during South Carolina's antebellum period. Her style was characterized as fluent and easy, not pandering to the sensational, or being guilty of "fine writing". She never published a book, although her writings on various subjects, political, literary, and religious, would have filled several volumes.

== Biography ==
Esther (nickname, "Essie") Blythe Cheesborough was born in Charleston, South Carolina, 1826. Her father was John W. Cheesborough, a prominent shipping merchant of Charleston. Her mother, Elera, was a native of Liverpool, England. She had two brothers and two sisters.

Cheesborough was educated by private tutors in Philadelphia and in her native city, Charleston.

She started writing at an early age under the pen names of "Motte Hall", "Elma South", "Ide Delmar", and the initials, "E. B. C."

She was a regular contributor to the Southern Literary Gazette, published in Charleston, and edited by the Rev. William C. Richards; and when Paul Hayne assumed the editorship, she continued her contributions. She was also a contributor to Russell's Magazine, and to various other Southern literary journals, including Land we Love.

After the civil war, she was a regular contributor to the Watchman, a weekly journal, edited and published in New York City by the Rev. Dr. Charles Deems, of North Carolina, with which journal she was connected until its discontinuance. She also contributed to Family Journal, Wood's Household Magazine, and Demorest's. She was the last co-worker of the poets, Paul Hamilton Hayne and Henry Timrod.

Essie Cheesborough died at her home in Charleston, December 29, 1905.
