= Agnes Leonard Hill =

American journalist

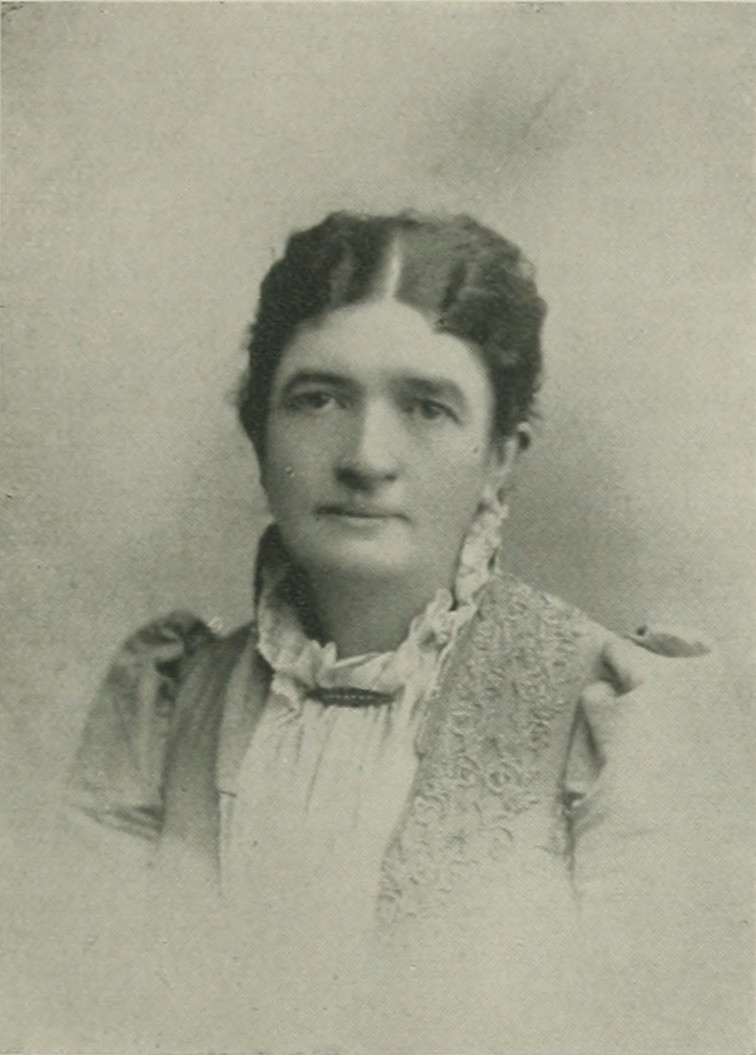
- Photo in A Woman of the Century
- Born: Agnes Leonard; January 20, 1842; Louisville, Kentucky, U.S.
- Died: January 20, 1917 (aged 75); Chicago, Illinois, U.S.
- Occupations: journalist; author; poet; newspaper founder and publisher; evangelist; social reformer
- Spouses: Simeon Edwin Scanland (m. 1868; died 1871); Samuel Howe Hill (m. 1872)
- Children: 4
- Writing career
- Pen name: Mollie Myrtle; Garth Godfrey
- Language: English

Agnes Leonard Hill (née, Leonard; pen names, Mollie Myrtle and Garth Godfrey; January 20, 1842 – January 20, 1917) was an American journalist, newspaper founder and publisher, as well as an author and poet, an evangelist and a social reformer. Born in Louisville, Kentucky, her mother died when Hill was a small child, and with her father remaining unmarried, and indulgent, Hill led a roving, gypsy sort of life, following her inclinations, and studying persons rather than books. From earliest childhood, she evinced a fondness for writing.

As an adult, Hill lived in Chicago, Illinois and Denver, Colorado. She wrote editorials for various newspapers in those cities and states. Hill was the author of Vanquished, Heights and Depths, Hints on How to Talk, Myrtle Blossoms, Said Confidentially, What Makes Social Leadership, Who are the Vulgar?, How to Give Gifts Acceptably, Evidences of Reincarnation, Christian Science vs. Commons Sense, and The Coming Religion. Widowed twice, she made a living from her writing,. Still, she is also remembered for her evangelism in the United States and England, her lectures on literature, and her outreach to convicts in penitentiaries, jails, and prisons.

Hill was regarded as one of the noted writers, poets, and evangelists in the U.S. and was considered by many as an authority on social customs and correct behavior. She was honored in the U.S., France and Germany for her writings.

== Early life and education ==
Agnes Leonard was born in Louisville, Kentucky, January 20, 1842. Her parents were Dr. Oliver Langdon Leonard, a native of Springfield, Massachusetts, and Agnes Howard (Sayle) Leonard, of Virginian parentage, who died in Louisville, leaving three children.

On the paternal side, she was descended from the English Earls of Sussex, one of whose house came to New England in early colonial days and in gratitude for his safe landing, named his first child born on American soil "Preserved", and this name was given to the oldest son for several generations. One of these, Preserved Leonard, married Joanna Langdon, daughter of John Langdon (q.v.), presiding officer of the first U. S. senate and a signer of the constitution, and they were the grandparents of our subject. Her first American ancestor on the maternal side was Louis Francois Phillip Jacob Copeland Irion (later spelled Arion), a French nobleman who settled in Virginia during the French Revolution.

Hill's father, Dr. Oliver Langdon Leonard, was for many years celebrated as a "mathematician." He practiced medicine in the city of Louisville for many years; yet desiring to give his children the best possible educational advantages under his direct supervision, he gave up his practice as a physician, and took charge of the Masonic College in La Grange, Kentucky, just before the Civil War, and was afterwards President of the Henry Female College, at New Castle, Kentucky. He also founded the Inductive Academy at Lexington, Kentucky. He evolved from Pestalozzi's theories a method of education which he defined as "teaching a child to grow his own thoughts rather than repeat, parrot-like, the thoughts of others". His views concerning education were somewhat peculiar and very original.

After her mother's death, while Hill was just a young girl, she made her home with an aunt whose husband was at that time British ambassador to the United States. Here, members of the English nobility were frequently entertained. By her father, Hill was taught to write before she could read, and could write a letter at the age of five years, and before she knew a printed letter. She studied Algebra and the elementary principles of Geometry when she was seven years of age, and when she was only thirteen, began to write for the press. Her first article was a short effort at versification, which was published in the Louisville Courier-Journal and noticed by George D. Prentice, as follows:

A young girl, twelve years of age, sends us a piece of poetry, written when she was only ten. Though hardly worthy to be published, it indicates the existence of a bud of genius, which, properly cultivated, will expand into a glorious flower.

Soon after this, her name became well known as subscribed to verses, sketches and short stories, published in the New York Weekly, The Knickerbocker, and several Chicago papers. In her early girlhood, she published three books, but did not consider any of them worthy of preservation. In 1862, she graduated from Henry Female College.

== Career ==
=== Journalist and author ===
In the beginning of the war, my father's family were for the Union. In Chicago, I had abundant opportunity to become acquainted with the Northern people. I came hither with a girlish devotion to glorious ideals of Northern men and women, such as I fancied must be the result of Northern advantages. I expected to find social culture combined with the highest intellectual attainment. I anticipated the generosity that belongs to greatness. With my heart loving the South, my mind expected to do all honor to Northern advantages and intellect. I was bitterly disappointed. The taunts and outrages of the North, and the sorrows of my beloved South, bring me a sobbing child to the old home, and henceforth I labor for her honor and glory.

In 1863, during the Civil War, Dr. Leonard and family removed to Chicago; he died there in 1864. Hill was motherless, and as the family had property in Chicago, she remained there. In that first year, 1863, a collection of Hill's earlier efforts appeared in book form, under the title of Myrtle Blossoms. There was nothing unusual in the volume, the merit being of a negative order. Some of the poems were very good; one critic saying: "These poems are so harmonious, as almost to set themselves to music." "After the Battle!" is one of the best poems of the volume.

Carleton & Co., of New York City, published in 1867 a volume of Hill's entitled Vanquished.

Her first work as an editorial writer was on the Chicago Times, in 1854, under the regime of Wilbur F. Storey. In 1867, she contributed to it a series of articles, entitled "Men, Women, and Beasts". She continued to be associated with the Chicago Times through 1895. She also did editorial work for at least five other Chicago papers. Hill was an editorial contributor to the Chicago Tribune, Chicago Inter Ocean, and Chicago News (beginning in 1876). She served as editor of Sorosis (1868–69), a Chicago suffrage paper devoted to the interests of woman, and The Elite News (Chicago).

By 1870, she was writing for the Louisville Sunday Courier. In 1871, Heights and Depths, a novel, was published.

Removing to Colorado in the 1880s, Hill assisted her brother, Percy Allan Leonard, who was engaged in newspaper work in the West. Many of her poems, stories and philosophical studies were published in The Daily Dispatch of Leadville, Colorado (1886–92), the Chaffee County Times of Buena Vista, Colorado (associate editor, 1880–86), and several other publications owned by Percy. She also contributed to leading Denver newspapers, and was a contributor of verse and prose to Eastern magazines and newspapers.

In Denver, in December 1888, she established the weekly paper, Western Society, and in Chicago in 1890, Home and Society. The province of the latter was to cultivate love of home, and to educate for success in an honest and ennobling society. Both publications dealt with ethical subjects and emphasized the importance of good manners.

What Makes Social Leadership was written in 1892 and published in 1893. The Coming Religion was published in 1900. A book on conversation entitled Hints on How to Talk (Chicago, R.R. Donnelly & Sons Co.) was published in 1901. Of it, she said:— "This book is the out-growth of both pain and pleasure, the pain of enforced proximity to stupid, commonplace, and uninteresting people, and the occasional pleasure of meeting 'choice spirits', whose presence makes the romance of existence." A second book of verse, Said Confidentially was published in 1902. How to Give Gifts Acceptably and Evidences of Reincarnation were both published in 1903. Some of her writings appeared under the pseudonym "Mollie Myrtle" and also "Garth Godfrey", but later, under her own name. She left many unpublished writings to be arranged by her children.

=== Evangelist and reformer ===
Evangelical work was an important part of Hill's activities. She was assistant pastor of St. Paul's Universalist Church in Chicago from 1896 through 1905. In April 1896, she began a series there entitled, "Talks on American Authors". The following month, she spoke on "The Gospel of Good Form".

She also temporarily occupied various pulpits in Colorado, Illinois, and Connecticut. Hill went to England and France in 1904-05 and while in England, held a pastorate in a Congregational church at Wollaston. She also founded a children's temperance society and mission in England. Hill did much prison work; she spoke to convicts in penitentiaries, and visited jails and prisons in different parts of the United States.

As a lecturer, Hill was held in high esteem, among her themes being English and American literature, and social questions in their various aspects. She lectured at the University of Denver and other places. Before her arrival, it was announced that she would attend and speak at the Friends yearly meeting in Wichita, Kansas in October 1915, and that she would also delivered some lectures on social education in Wichita after the meeting ended. In 1916, she lectured on temperance and education in the West and South U.S. and gave several courses of parlor lectures. In February of that year, an Oklahoma newspaper referred to as a "Social Educator", her chief claim to distinction in this area being the fact that she was able to reduce the science of good form to certain fundamental laws, thereby establishing a standard or code of conduct. From years of study and a wealth of social experience in the U.S. and abroad, Hill became qualified to speak along the line of social ideals. In these lectures, she collected rulings and principles governing courteous relationship with society.

== Personal life ==
She was twice married. Her first marriage occurred October 29, 1868, to Dr. Simeon Edwin Scanland, formerly of Kentucky; there was one child by this union, Edith S. Scanland. Dr. Scanland died in April, 1871. Her second marriage occurred May 15, 1872, to Samuel Howe Hill of Bangor, Maine, a grandson of Samuel Gridley Howe, of Boston, and related to Elias Howe, inventor of the sewing machine. There were three children of the marriage: Percy Leonard Hill, Marie Olive Hill, and Agnes Leonard Hill (Mrs. William Arthur Veyce).

Hill died at Presbyterian hospital in Chicago, January 20, 1917. She was survived by her four children, and was buried at Oak Woods Cemetery.

== Selected works ==
- Hints on How to Talk, 1891

=== Novels ===
- Vanquished, 1866 (text)
- Heights and Depths, 1871

=== Poetry ===
- Myrtle Blossoms, 1863
- Said Confidentially, 1902

=== Pamphlets ===
- What Makes Social Leadership, 1892
- Who are the Vulgar?
- How to Give Gifts Acceptably

=== Metaphysical books ===
- Evidences of Reincarnation
- Christian Science vs. Commons Sense
- The Coming Religion, 1900
