= Sally Elizabeth Wood =

Canadian photographer (1857–1928)

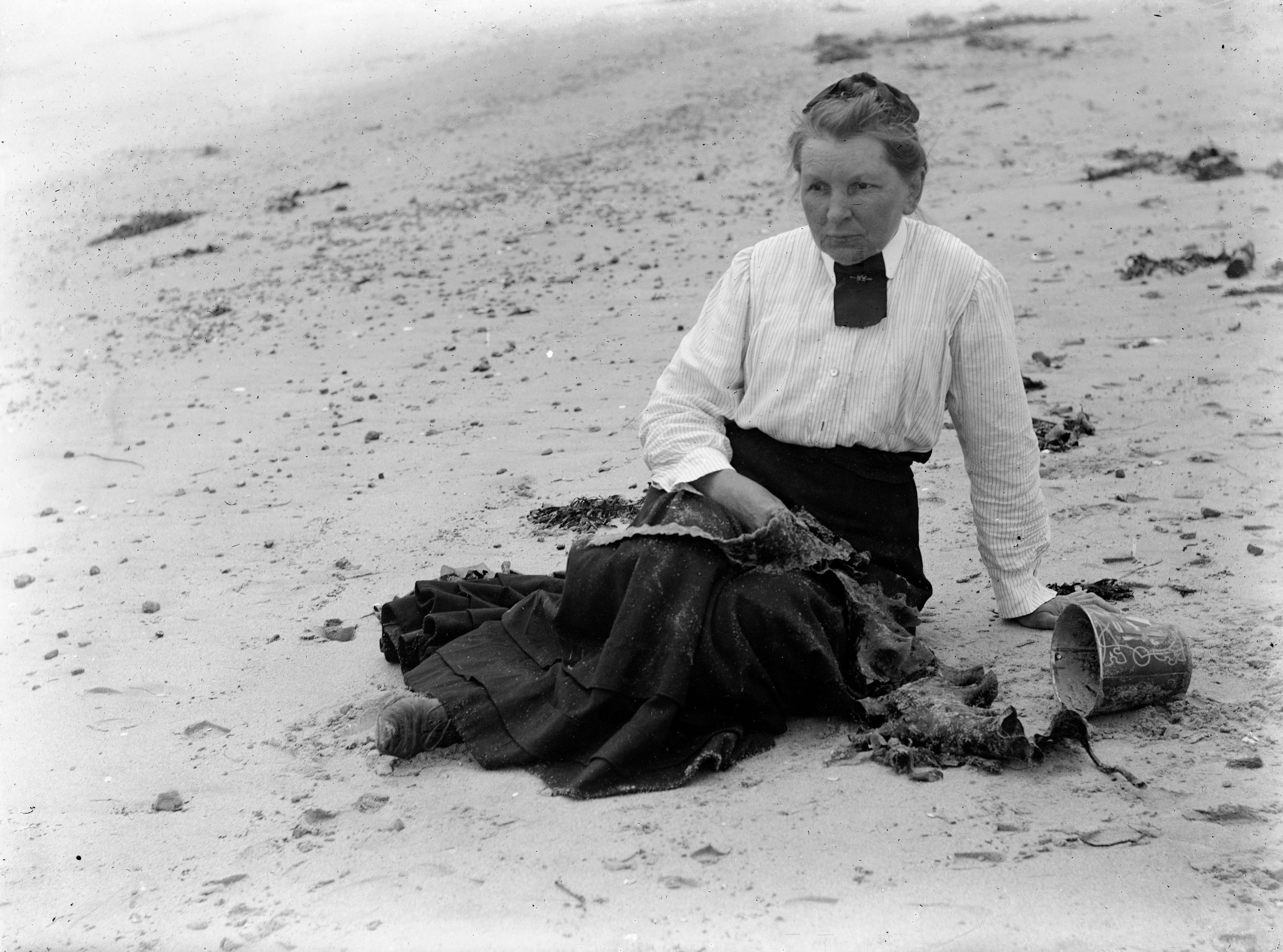
- Born: 1857; Brome, Canada East
- Died: 1928 (aged 70–71)
- Known for: Photography

Sally Elizabeth Wood also known as Sally Eliza Wood (1857–1928) was a Canadian photographer who lived in Quebec. After training under William Notman, she worked for John A. Wheeler until she opened her own studio in 1897. She is remembered in particular for her views of the local architecture and her countryside scenes in Brome County.

== Life ==
Born in Knowlton, Brome County, Sally Elizabeth Wood was the youngest daughter of Philip Wood, a native of Quebec, and his wife Sally Eliza née Foster who was born in the United States. The youngest of five children, she was brought up on the family's farm in Knowlton.

She worked as an apprentice for the celebrated photographer William Notman in Montreal who introduced her to portraits, landscapes and genres. She then returned to Brome County where she worked in John A. Wheeler's photography studio in Knowlton. After Wheeler retired in 1897, Wood opened her own studio in Knowlton. Around 1905, she produced a series of post cards depicting buildings in Knowlton and landscapes from Brome County which were tinted and published by Valentine & Sons in Scotland. Wood also took outside views of large family gatherings. In addition to her many conventional studio portraits, some depict a chair as the only accessory.

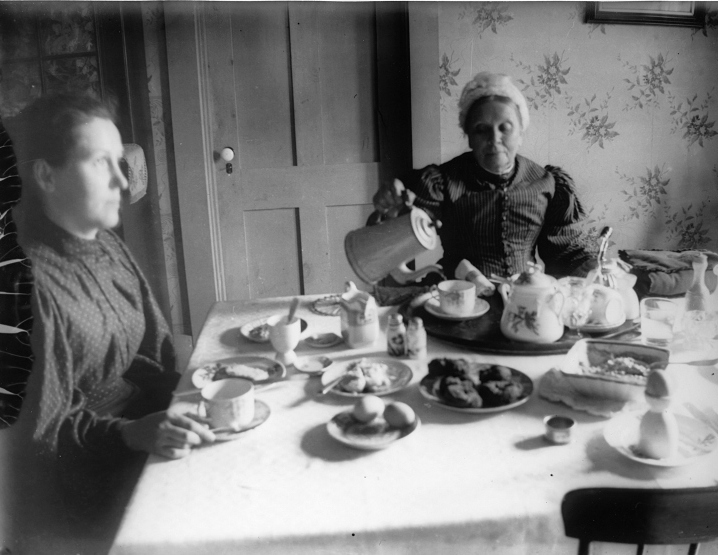
Tea party, woman pouring, Knowlton, Quebec, about 1900, by Sally Eliza Wood

Her work is in the collection of the McCord Museum. She was one of few women working in photography during that period and was also exceptional in that she worked with glass plate negatives and transported the required heavy equipment herself to various locations around the county. Other techniques she used included silver gelatin prints and carte de visite. Not afraid to reveal her gender, she signed her postcard series "Miss S.E. Wood".

Wood operated her own studio until around 1907. She died in 1928. Her work is exhibited by the Lac-Brome Museum from May 2021 to April 2022 together with works by John Wheeler (1864-1933) in an exhibition titled "Wood & Wheeler".

== Collection ==
Over 300 examples of her work are held by the Lac-Brome Museum in a collection titled "Fonds BCHS202 - Sally E. Wood fonds". They include photographic prints and glass negatives taken between 1857 and 1928. They depict Brome County with picturesque countryside scenes and views of local architecture.
