= Rebecca S. Nichols =

American poet

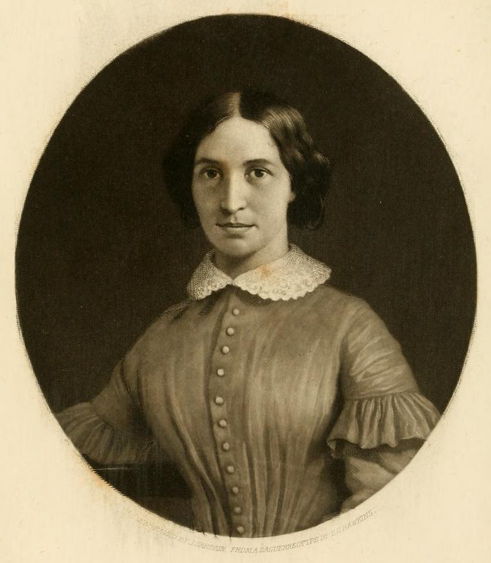
- Photo in Songs of the heart and the hearthstone, 1851
- Born: Rebecca Shepard Reed; October 28, 1819; Greenwich, New Jersey, U.S.
- Died: June 21, 1903 (aged 83); Indianapolis, Indiana, U.S.
- Occupations: writer; newspaper editor
- Spouse: Willard Nichols (m. 1838)
- Writing career
- Pen name: Ellen; Kate Cleaveland
- Genre: poetry

Rebecca S. Nichols (née, Reed; pen names, Ellen and Kate Cleaveland; October 28, 1819 – June 21, 1903) was a 19th American poet from New Jersey. At an early age, she removed to the West. She was among the first of the writers in the "young West" to receive popular recognition for her prose and poetry. Her first published pieces appeared in the Louisville, Kentucky News-Letter, a paper conducted by Prentice & Co., since which time, she contributed much poetry to the various western periodicals. Beginning in the autumn of 1840, she resided in Cincinnati. Her period of literary activity, which began in 1839, extended over sixteen years, till 1855. She did not write a great deal after that, though some of her better productions were sparsely scattered over the five years subsequent to this period.

== Early life ==
Rebecca Shepard Reed was born in Greenwich, New Jersey, October 28, 1819. While she was yet a child, her father, E. B. Reed, a physician, removed with his family to the West.

== Career ==
While residing in Louisville, Kentucky, in the year 1838, she married Willard Nichols, a printer by trade, whom she accompanied to St. Louis, Missouri, in 1840, where Mr. Nichols embarked on the publication of a daily news and miscellaneous paper. She assisted in editing the paper. In 1841, the Nichols moved to Cincinnati, where they continued to reside most of the time until 1851. This was a period of considerable literary activity in that region, which eventuated in the bringing out of some of the best writers the West has ever produced. Contemporary with these, Mrs. Nichols became popular.

Mrs. Nichols's earliest poems were published in the Louisville News-Letter, and Louisville Journal, under the signature "Ellen". In 1844, she published a small volume entitled Berenice, or the Curse of Minna, and other Poems. The principal poem in this volume was a girl-tragedy. Several of the minor pieces had merit. Only a small edition of this book was printed.

In 1846, Mrs. Nichols conducted a literary periodical in Cincinnati, called The Guest, which became quite popular, and in which she published many of her poetical compositions of that period. She was also a contributor to Graham's Magazine, The Knickerbocker, and other Eastern periodicals. Early in her Cincinnati career, Mrs. Nichols contributed to the Cincinnati Herald, conducted by Gamaliel Bailey, a series of papers under the nom de plume of "Kate Cleaveland". Critics and amateur littérateurs tried to discover who this new author, a bright star, was. Eventually, it became known that the author was Mrs. Nichols.

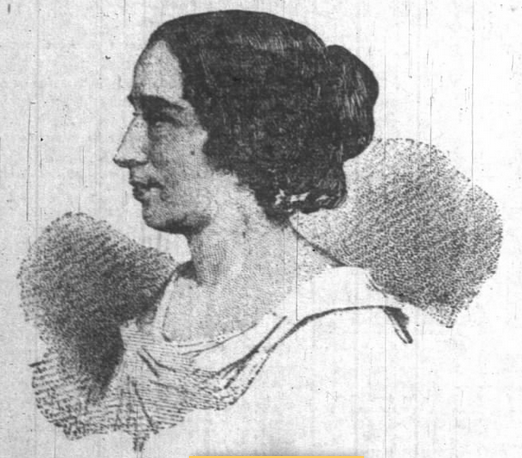
1858

In 1851, under the patronage of Nicholas Longworth, a large volume of Mrs. Nichols's later poems were published under the title of Songs of the Heart and of the Hearth-Stone, from the press of Thomas, Cowperthwaite & Co., Philadelphia, and J. F. Desilver, Cincinnati. Such was the established popularity of the author at this time, that the publishers of the Cincinnati Commercial, M. D. Potter & Co., entered into an arrangement with Mrs. Nichols, to pay a liberal price for an original poem for each week, if she chose to write so often, which arrangement was continued for some time. A collection of these and other later poems, with a selection from her previous publications, would furnish material for a new volume, which would add largely to the reputation of the author.

Among her noted poems which were widely circulated in book collections and in newspaperes may be mentioned "Stanzas by Moonlight", "The Minstrel's Last Song", "The Farewell of the Soul to the Body", "The Philosopher Toad", "Indian Summer", and "The Bonnie Brown Bird in the Mulberry Tree". Many of her poems were set to music and were popular among singers.

== Personal life ==
Mrs. Nichols dealt with difficulties all of her life including the untimely death of children, and the fluctuations of business. Of seven children, only two survived to adulthood, Mrs. Isabel Adams and W. C. Nichols.

In her later years, Mrs. Nichols lived an active life and in 1900, took a trip to Chicago. A few months before her death, her health failed perceptibly. She died in Indianapolis on June 21, 1903, of old age.

== Selected works ==
- Berenice, or the Curse of Minna, and other Poems, 1844
- Songs of the Heart and of the Hearth-Stone, 1851
