= Sarah F. Wood =

UK tech executive & academic (1973-)

Sarah Florence Wood
- Born: 1973 (age 52–53); Newcastle upon Tyne, England
- Education: University of Cambridge
- Occupation: Businesswoman
- Spouse: Scott Button
- Writing career
- Notable awards: OBE

Sarah Florence Wood (born 1973) is a British businesswoman. She is the co-founder of video advertising platform Unruly and received an OBE for services to innovation and technology.

== Early life and education ==
Wood was born in Newcastle upon Tyne, England where she lived until the age of ten before moving close to Brighton. Wood graduated from Cambridge University with a bachelor's degree in English and a master's degree in American literature.

== Career ==
From 2002 to 2004 Wood worked as a fundraising and development officer The Old Vic theatre in London. From 2004 to 2005, she was a lecturer in American Studies at the University of Sussex.

In 2006, Wood co-founded Unruly, a global video advertising marketplace, with Scott Button and Matt Cooker. In 2015 Wood and her co-founders sold Unruly to American media and publishing company News Corp.

In 2018, Wood was appointed a non-executive board member for global lifestyle clothing brand Superdry. additionally, She has served as a judge for the Women's Prize for Fiction. Wood is an independent director on the board of Tech Nation, a growth platform for British tech entrepreneurs.

Wood is also an ambassador for The Prince's Trust "Women Supporting Women" programme, and is on the advisory boards for AccelerateHer and City Ventures (University of London).

In October 2018, Wood released her first publication Stepping Up, about business leadership.

During 2021, Wood was appointed Non Executive Director of UK-based artificial intelligence company Signal AI. The company uses artificial intelligence to transform data into accessible business knowledge. Additionally in 2021, Wood was also appointed Non Executive Director of International investment firm Hambro Perks, an acquisition firm that provide capital and support to technology-enabled companies.

Wood has also been listed as a trustee for children's charity the Anna Freud National Centre.

== Recognition ==
In 2015, Wood was voted one of "15 Women to Watch in Tech" by Inc., one of Europe's "'most inspiring women' in technology" by Inspiring Fifty and #4 in Digital Spy's "Top 10 Women in Tech".

In November 2016 Wood received an OBE in the Queen's 90th Birthday Honours for services to innovation and technology.

In March 2023, Wood was listed as number 67 on the Evening Standard Tech Rich List with a reported networth of roughly £67 million.

== Personal life ==
She lives in London with her husband Scott Button and her three children.

== Works ==
- — (2000). "Historical cameos in early American fiction". Notes and Queries. 47 (3). Oxford University Press: 328–329. doi:10.1093/nq/47.3.328. ISSN 0029-3970.
- — (2002). Broken heads and bloated tales: Quixotic fictions of the USA, 1792-1815 (PhD thesis). University College London.
- — (2005). Quixotic fictions of the USA: 1792-1815. Oxford world's classics. Oxford University Press. ISBN 978-0-19-927315-7.
- — (2006). "Refusing to RIP; or, Return of the dispossessed: The transatlantic revivals of Irving's Rip Van Winkle". Symbiosis: A Journal of Anglo-American Literary Relations. 10 (1): 3–19.
- — (2008). "Transatlantic Cervantics: Don Quixote and the fictions of American Enlightenment". In Manning, Susan; Cogliano, Francis D. (eds.). The Atlantic Enlightenment. Ashgate series in nineteenth-century transatlantic studies. London: Ashgate. pp. 113–130. ISBN 978-0-7546-6040-8.
- with O'Keeffe, Niamh (2017). Stepping up: How to accelerate your leadership potential. Pearson Education. ISBN 978-1-292-18642-9.
