= Harlette Hayem =

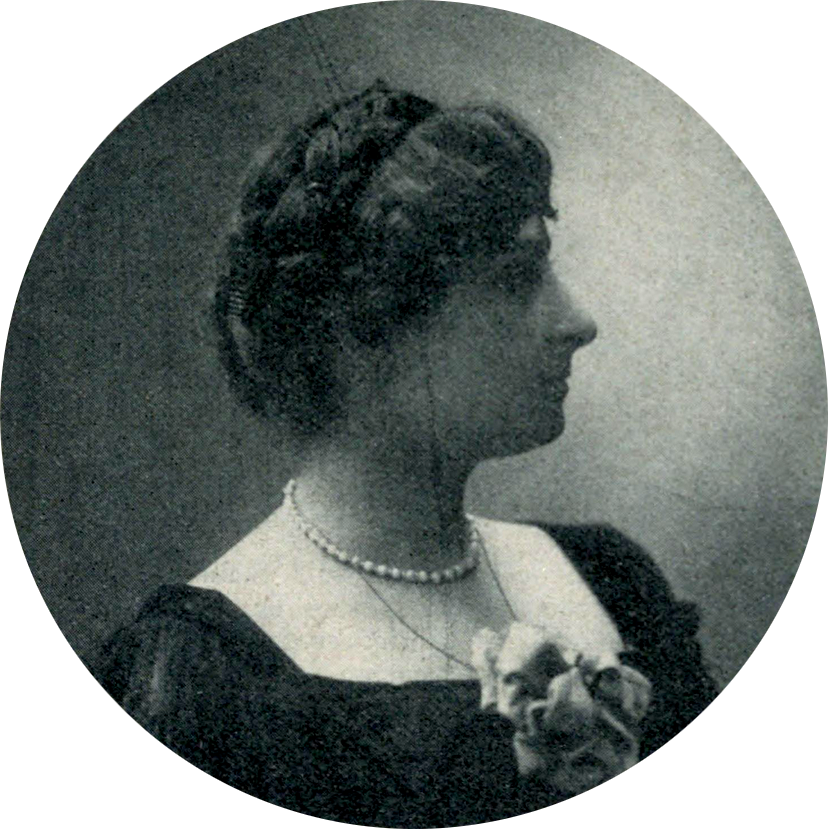
- Born: Harlette Mathilde Flore Emma Odette Hayem; October 6, 1881; Paris, France
- Died: June 16, 1958 (aged 76)
- Occupations: Poet, writer
- Parent: Armand Hayem
- Writing career
- Pen name: Claude Ascain, Henry Chalgrain

Signature
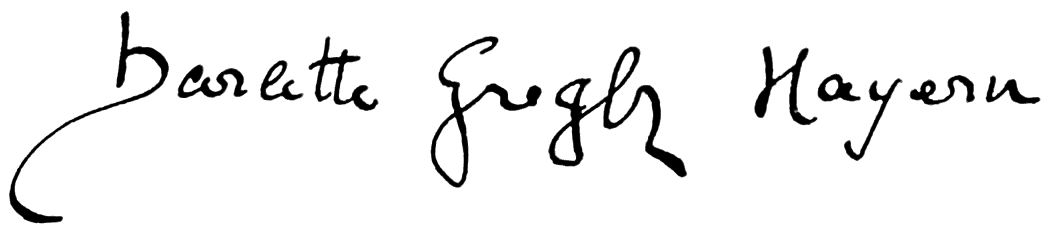

Harlette Hayem (Madame Fernand Gregh) (pen names, Henry Chalgrain and Claude Ascain; October 6, 1881 – June 16, 1958) was a French woman of letters. Madame Gregh wrote various literary articles under the pseudonym "Henry Chalgrain". Her initial poetry appeared in December 1905 in the Revue de Paris. At first, she used her own name as her signature, but after her marriage, she adopted her husband's name and signed as Madame Fernand Gregh.

== Biography ==
Harlette Hayem was the goddaughter of Jules Barbey d'Aurevilly. She was born in Paris in October 1881 and married Fernand Gregh in 1903. They lived in Passy, in the hamlet of Boulainvilliers, where they entertained artists, writers and political figures. They had two children, François-Didier Gregh (1906) and Geneviève Gregh, Maurice Druon's first wife.

She was a jury member for the Prix Fémina.

In the press, she used the pseudonym "Claude Ascain", contributing to Le Figaro, Les Lettres, L'Illustration, La Revue de Paris and others. This pseudonym was also wrongly attributed to detective novels written by Henri Musnik, under the same pen name.

She is buried with her husband in Thomery cemetery.

== Awards and honours ==
She was awarded the Legion of Honour, with the rank of chevalier. In 1908, she was awarded the Prix Archon-Despérouses.

== Works ==
- Jeunesse, poèmes, ed. Sansot, 1907. Awarded by the Académie française.
- Vertige de New York (Société française d'éditions littéraires et techniques, 1935). For this travel guide, she received the Ralph Beaver Strassburger Prize.
- Invocation, one of her poems.
- Notes by Alphonse Séché and Gérard Walch.
