= Lurana W. Sheldon =

American author and editor

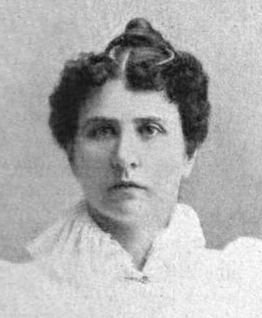
- Born: Lurana Waterhouse Sheldon; April 11, 1862; Hadlyme, Connecticut, U.S.
- Died: June 11, 1945 (aged 83); Maine, U.S.
- Education: Woman's Medical College of the New York Infirmary
- Occupations: Author; lecturer; editor
- Spouse: Isaac F. Ferris (m. 1904)
- Relatives: Jonathan Edwards
- Writing career
- Pen name: Richard Hackstaff, Stanley Norris, Grace Shirley
- Language: English
- Genres: novels, poetry, short stories
- Notable work: "Marion Marlowe" dime novel series

Lurana W. Sheldon (after marriage, Ferris; pen names, Richard Hackstaff, Stanley Norris, Grace Shirley; April 11, 1862 – June 11, 1945) was an American author of novels, poems, and short stories, as well as a newspaper editor. Her published work amounted to over one million words. She claimed to have earned her living in fifteen different and totally dissimilar lines of business, including bookkeeping, business management, journalism, work in a chemical laboratory, buying dry goods, and writing stories. She was a suffrage activist, and she opposed prohibition. Sheldon was the first poet in the United States to use her talents for the birth control movement. She is also remembered for her "Marion Marlowe" dime novel series. Though without funds at the beginning of her career, she met every expense that she ever incurred without once asking for an "extension of time" or credit.

== Early years and education ==
Lurana Waterhouse Sheldon was born April 11, 1862, at Hadlyme, Connecticut, the daughter of Asa Sheldon and Christiana F. (Waterhouse) Sheldon. She was of New England origin, her mother being a descendant of early Cape Cod settlers and her father the great-grandchild of Jonathan Edwards, an eminent divine of the eighteenth century.

Sheldon received the best education that a public and private school could give her. In the fall of 1882, she matriculated with the Woman's Medical College of the New York Infirmary. During her first year in college, Sheldon boarded at the New York Bible and Fruit Mission, and in her visits with that organization to Blackwells Island, Harts Island, Wards Island, and others, where the cities' paupers, lunatics, imbeciles, incurables and convicts were quartered, she saw enough to convince her that no such being as a God could exist and that the question of existence had only a physical basis. After spending six years in the study and practice of medicine, she was obliged to abandon it because of threatened nervous prostration.

== Career ==
=== Medicine ===
Sheldon spent two years at the Woman's Medical College of the New York Infirmary, and nearly seven years in hospitals, helping the physicians in many ways. Concerning her work in the Connecticut Hospital for the Insane, Dr. James M. Kenniston wrote about her in the Portland Express-Advertiser, the largest paper in Maine:—

"She came to the Connecticut Hospital for the Insane for a few weeks solely to le.arn by actual experience and research exactly how the insane were treated. Every opportunity was extended to her for investigation, and she was given the run of the entire place. Her thoroness in studying every phase of the work was only equalled by the success she achieved in winning the regards of the patients she met. Unlike some sane people, one thing is absolutely certain: all but those completely demented, whatever the form of their mental disorder, always recognize, abhor, and resent deceit and insincerity. Therefore they all loved Mrs Ferris, and their regret at her departure was genuine and sincere. As I have followed her literary and humanitarian course thru all these years, I can in part understand it by what I personally knew of her really-brilliant and fruitful investigations at the hospital.

=== Writing ===
Sheldon started earning her own living at the age of seventeen. She began writing verses at the age of ten years, but it was not until she was twenty-five that she placed a monetary value upon her written work. From that time, she began filling in odd hours with her writing. Like many another prominent authors of her day, Sheldon's first successes were made through the columns of the New York Mercury. Sheldon's poem entitled "The Medical Student's Dream," together with some prose work, was requested for the exhibit of New York State literature by the Board of Managers at the World's Columbian Exposition in Chicago in 1893.

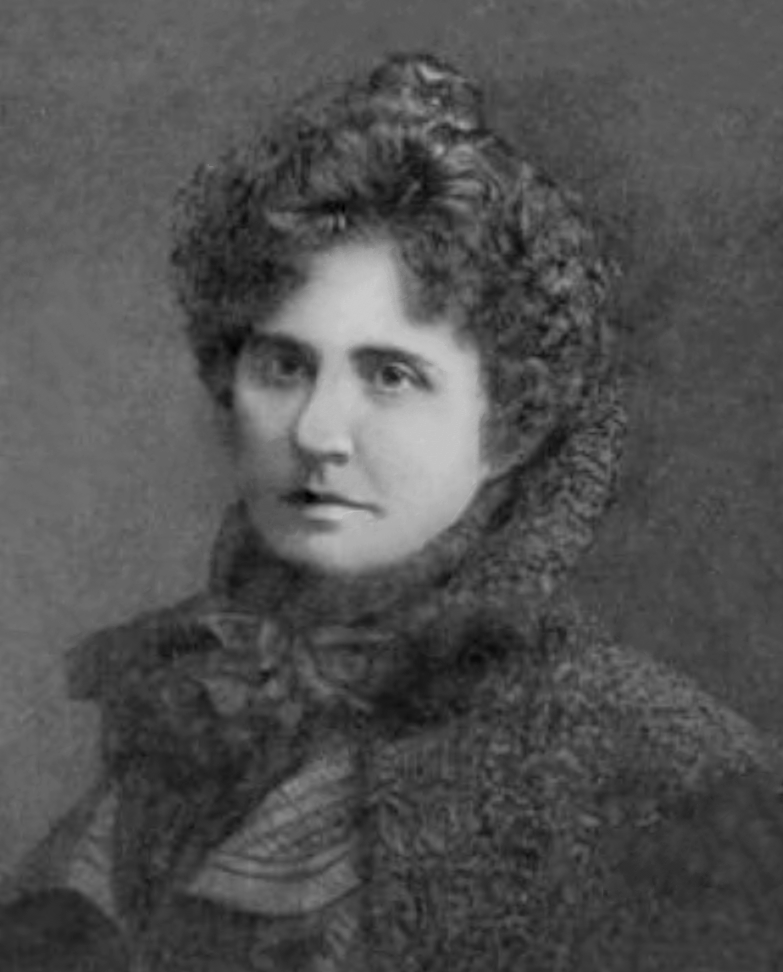
Lurana Waterhouse Sheldon (1902)

By 1900, her published stories amounted to over two hundred and her humorous verses were known to every editor of a Sunday newspaper and pictorial weekly in the United States. From 1900 to 1902, she worked under contract with one of the large publishing houses of New York City. In one year alone (1900), Sheldon's published work amounted to over one million words, and not a week passed without a story from her pen appearing upon the bookstands. In 1901, Sheldon spent six months at Saratoga Springs, New York before returning to New York City, having benefitted by the change of air and long-continued rest.

Sheldon wrote war poetry for The New York Times, the New York Times Current History Magazine, and Munsey's Magazine. So many of Sheldon's poems appeared on the editorial page of The New York Times that her name became closely associated with that paper. While Sheldon was better known for her poetry, she occasionally wrote non-fiction articles for various periodicals.

She is also remembered for her "Marion Marlowe" dime novel series including My Queen, which was an exception to the romance stories of the day where the heroine married at the end of the novel, leaving no compelling reason to write a sequel.

Sheldon published the greater part of her work under assumed names, or no name at all, partly through her own desire and partly through the injustice of editors. Her range of literary work extended from short Freethought articles for various liberal magazines, humor for Sunday newspapers, ghost stories and pathos for various monthlies, to thrilling tales of adventure for boys. Sheldon's affection for animals amounted almost to mania, and she declared in more than forcible language that "if she were possessed of great wealth, she would spend a large portion of it in trying to punish two classes of people—first, the class who neglect or ill-treat animals, and, second, the men and women who bring children into the world without a clean bill of health, morals or temperament, to say nothing of sufficient wealth to insure them against hardship."

Her published work consisted of seven novels, about two hundred short stories, more than one thousand poems, and many articles on scientific and sociological subjects. A medical education, coupled with opportunity for wide observation of the poor, gave Sheldon knowledge along sociological lines. One of her achievements was a sociological lecture in verse, entitled "The Alien," which was heard in New York and elsewhere in 1915. One poem of this lecture, "The Night Court," was widely read and copied. Sheldon was the author of several novels and serial stories, many short stories and special articles, and more than one thousand poems, the latter having appeared in nearly every magazine and paper of prominence in the U.S. For many years, she also wrote a large number of the unsigned verses.

=== Religion and Freethought ===
Sheldon was brought up an orthodox Congregationalist, but her doubts ripened early and reaped their harvest. The God of the Bible soon became in her eyes not only a "moral monstrosity" but an "inconceivable hypothesis," and she saw no shadow of reason in the "vicarious atonement." A God who creates beings with an "inclination" toward evil furnishes the temptation for the committing of said evil, and then punishes his own creatures for acting out the impulses of their natures, was a being whom she could not and would not worship. In early life, she read Dodd, Drummond, and John Stuart Mill, and studied the Bible with a concordance, besides spending many hours praying for enlightenment on these subjects, but the only knowledge which she could glean that in any way satisfied her common sense and reason came later in the study of Ludwig Büchner, Aldous Huxley, Charles Darwin, and Herbert Spencer, and in company with such intellects as these she soon realized that she was beyond the need of faith in the undemonstrable vagaries of superstition.

When she asked for suitable employment for a woman of her intelligence at the Woman's Christian Association, she was requested to tell her family history, declare her faith in God and give up a percentage of her earnings for a servant's position. She declined with thanks and went her own way. It was another argument in favor of the utter worthlessness of Christian teachings. Whether Sheldon's religious infidelity was a reaction of Edward Jonathan's piety, she did not know, but if this was the case, to quote her own words, "the bigotry of the pious gentleman with the ten children was not in vain, it resulted in freeing at least one brain from the thraldom of inherent superstition."

She struggled to "keep her head above water" in a large city like New York, without money in her pocket. It was the injustice of human nature, what she considered to be the so-called handiwork of God, that prompted her to an occasional effort in the Freethought direction, "not but that people are welcome to any faith they choose but because a God that one could respect must be a welcome innovation." Such a God she found in "science". "Faith", "hope", and "love" represented nothing to her but the highest possible achievement of the physical organism, yet they lost nothing of their value springing from a source that was both reasonable and demonstrable. The little help and favors which she received through life did not come from churches, home missions or Christians. For years, she visited the outcasts of New York City with the members of some so-called "mission" or other, but the spectacle of some hypocrite, exhorting an honest sinner to "be good," was too much of a strain for a candid nature. Said Sheldon: "I have found the happiness of life in the companionship of books, animals and an occasional true frienc' and the satisfaction in dividing a dollar with one more destitute than myself. The rest is only a panorama of injustice and folly, a farce in which serious things, like child-bearing, are treated indifferently, and absurd matters like the salvation of a soul, which we do not know exists, are carried to the extreme of bloodshed and torture."

== Personal life ==
Though Sheldon was troubled by poor health, she traveled in the United States, Nova Scotia, and Newfoundland. She felt that no woman was ever contented with less of the world's goods than she was, and felt that the bitterness of life lay in unrewarded merit. She lived alone in a flat and shunned society for the reason that "the only people whom she ever agrees with are found in books, and she is tired of coming in contact with their ignorant maligners." She had no desire to pose as a reformer, but it was a constant source of irritation to her that people who were in position to do so did not avail themselves of the opportunity to improve existing conditions a little.

Of her hardships, Sheldon refused to talk, on the grounds that a "tale of woe" was never interesting to anyone but the teller. To quote her own words, she was "endowed with an inheritance of poverty, poor health and ambition, which prove, under any environments, a damnable mixture." With this handicap, she was forced to begin the struggle of life and, to add to her difficulties, she declared further she "was born with a spirit which could not tolerate rebuke and a mettle which would yield to no discipline whatever. I felt that I bad been wronged from the hour of my conception," she said, "and a feeling of resentment was the first sentiment of my nature." With this sentiment predominating, Sheldon could not and would not tread the only paths which were open to women in her position; she was determined to travel on the plane of her own inclinations or not travel at all, and her course was marked at every step with the bruises of collision with obstacles which a more acquiescent nature would not have encountered.

Sheldon was a prominent suffragist. In 1916 in Maine, she founded the Women's Defense Club with a purpose to "instruct American women to shoot, and shoot straight".

On November 20, 1904, (or November 20, 1903) she married Judge Isaac F. Ferris of York County, Maine, who had been a journalist in his early career. Childless, she died in Maine on June 11, 1945.

== Selected works ==
=== By Lurana W. Sheldon ===
- Death to the Inquisitive!: A Story of Sinful Love, 1892
- Is this your God?, 1900
- Whom god hath joined together, and The curse upon progress, 1900
- For Gold or Soul?: The Story of a Great Department Store, 1900
- As we forgive : a romance, 1928
- For Love Or Gold?: A Romance, 1928
- For Love Or Gold?: The Story of a Great Department Store, 1928

=== By Stanley Norris ===
- The young showman's triumph, or, a Grand tour on the road, 1903
- The young showman's rivals; ups and downs of the road, 1903
- The young showman's pluck; or, An unknown rider in the ring, 1903

=== By Richard Hackstaff ===
- "Tracked by a Pin", The Magnet Library
- Pete, the Breaker Boy, Or, The Young Coal Mine Ferret, 1906
- Bags, the Boy Detective, Or, A Warm Trail, 1907
- Bob, the Shadow, Or, Solving a Double Mystery, 1908

=== By Grace Shirley: My Queen, A Weekly Journal for Young Women ===
1. The Daisy Chain
2. The City Boarder
3. Marion Proves her Intuitions
4. The Abduction of Dollie
5. A Dark Deed
6. The Plot of a Villain
7. On the Track of the Abductor
8. The First News of Dollie
9. The Picture on the Poster
10. Marion Finds her Uncle At Last
11. The Return of Miss Gray
12. Marion Discovers Dollie
13. The Arrest and Rescue
14. Questions & Answers
15. Marion Marlowe in Buffalo, or, Betrayed by a rival company
16. Marion Marlowe in Chicago, or, Trapped by a lunatic
17. Marion Marlowe in Cleveland, or, The mystery of the red rose
18. Marion Marlowe in Columbus, or, Accused of a crime
19. Marion Marlowe in Denver, or, The tragedy of Pike's Peak
20. Marion Marlowe in Indianapolis, or, The adventure of Dr. Brookes
21. Marion Marlowe in Omaha, or, Held up by accident
22. Marion Marlowe in Salt Lake City, or, A bad deal in Mormon Land
23. Marion Marlowe in St. Louis, or, A forger's bold deed
24. Marion Marlowe in St. Paul, or, The company's mascot in a double deal
25. Marion Marlowe in Washington, or, Meeting the president
26. Marion Marlowe's noble work, or, The tragedy at the hospital
27. Marion Marlowe's money, or, Brave work in the slums
28. Marion Marlowe's skill, or, A week as a private detective
29. An interrupted wedding, or, Marion Marlowe as maid of honor
30. Marion Marlowe's courage, or, A brave girl's struggle for life and honor
31. Marion Marlowe's Christmas Eve, or, The treachery of a factory inspector
32. Marion Marlowe's true heart, or, How a daughter forgave
33. Marion Marlowe's peril, or, A mystery unveiled
34. Marion Marlowe's triumph, or, in spite of her enemies
35. Under lock and key, or, Marion Marlowe's last role
36. Marion Marlowe's noble work, or, The tragedy at the hospital
37. Marion Marlowe's cleverness, or, Exposing a bold fraud
38. Marion Marlowe entrapped, or, The victim of professional jealousy
39. Marion Marlowe's disappearance, or Almost a crime
40. A wonderful secret, or, Marion Marlowe's discovery
41. Marion Marlowe's escape, or, A dangerous mistake on the road
42. From farm to fortune, or, Only a farmer's daughter
43. Marion Marlowe in society, or, A race for a title
44. Marion Marlowe on the prairie, or, A thrilling ride across Kansas
45. A lover's quarrel, or, Marion Marlowe's deceitful friend

=== Other short stories ===
- "City Sleighing", The All-Story Magazine, Jan 1909
- "To the Wind", The Cavalier Feb 22 1913
- "Spring Attractions", The Cavalier, Apr 4 1914
- "The Autumn", Munsey’s Magazine, Nov 1914
- "It Might Be Worse!", All-Story Cavalier Weekly, Nov 21 1914
- "First Love", All-Story Weekly, Mar 10 1917
- "The Grand Army of 1918", Munsey’s Magazine, Feb 1918
- "The True Patriot", All-Story Weekly, Mar 2 1918
- "Gun Language", All-Story Weekly, May 18, 1918
- "Counting the Kisses", Munsey’s Magazine, Dec 1919
