= Jeannette H. Walworth =

American writer (1835 - 1918)

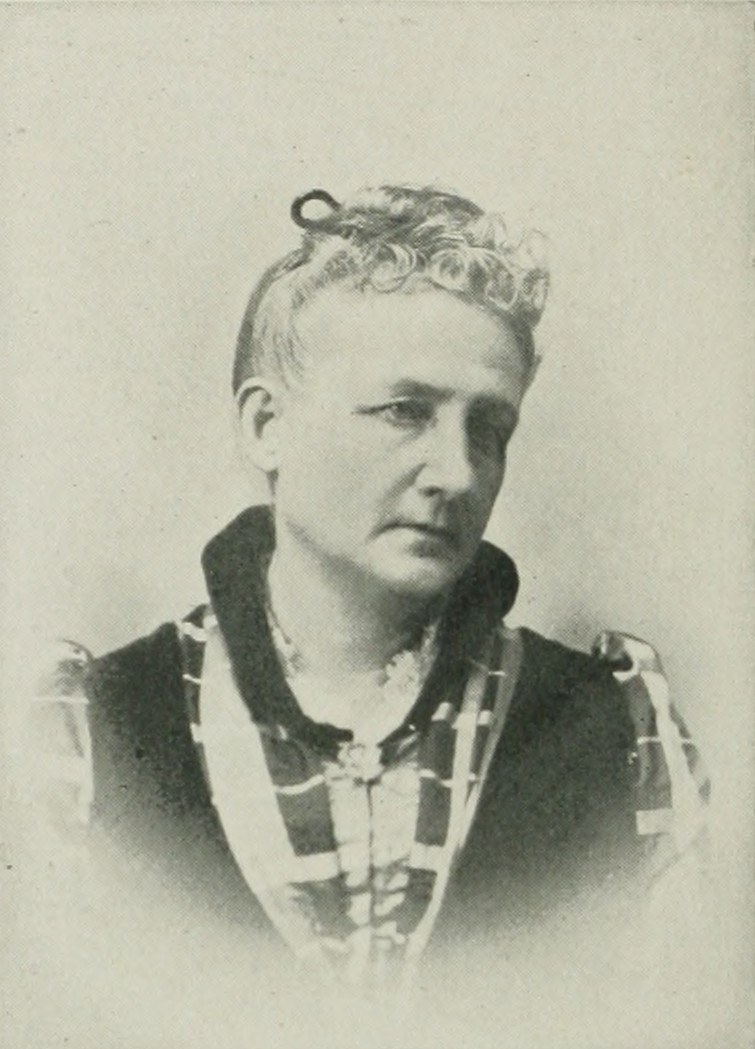
- "A Woman of the Century"
- Born: Jeannette Ritchie Hadermann; February 22, 1835; Philadelphia, Pennsylvania, U.S.
- Died: February 4, 1918 (aged 82); New Orleans, Louisiana, U.S.
- Occupations: Novelist, journalist
- Spouse: Douglas Walworth (m. 1873; died 1915)
- Writing career
- Pen name: Mother Goose, Ann Atom
- Language: English

Jeannette H. Walworth (née, Hadermann; pen names, Mother Goose and Ann Atom; February 22, 1835 – February 4, 1918) was an American novelist and journalist. Born in Philadelphia, in 1837, she removed to Natchez, Mississippi, while a child, with her father, Charles Julius Hadermann, a German baron, who became the president of Jefferson College. On his death, the family removed to Louisiana. When she was sixteen years old, Walworth became a governess. In 1873, having married Maj. Douglas Walworth, of Natchez, she accompanied him to his plantation in southern Arkansas, and then to Memphis, Tennessee, before finally removing to New York City. In addition to contributions to the periodical press, the Continent, The Commercial Appeal, and other magazines, she published several novels. Walworth died in 1918.

== Early years and education ==
Jeannette Ritchie Hadermann was born in Philadelphia, Pennsylvania, on February 22, 1835. Her father was Charles Julius Hadermann von Winsingen, a German baron and political exile, of Bonn, Prussia. The Baron was a nephew of Count Jean Rapp, who was created a peer of France by Napoleon for gallantry in battle. He was educated at Heidelberg and at the École Polytechnique in Paris. Political troubles of some nature drove him to the United States. He married Miss Matilda Norman of Baltimore, by whom he fathered Jeannette and six other children. By training and inclination he was a military man, and fought with distinction in the Mexican–American War. After the war, an excellent education led him to become a teacher. He was at different times professor of languages and mathematics at the University of Virginia, and at Princeton University, Oxford University, and elsewhere. He eventually became president of Jefferson College. The father moved his family to Natchez, Mississippi, where he died, after which the family moved to Louisiana.

Jeannette received a good education and showed great literary talent.

== Career ==
Walworth became a governess at the age of sixteen.

On December 9, 1873, she married a widower, Major Douglas Walworth, a prominent Southern editor, of Natchez. The Major had five children by his first marriage, and none with his second wife. They lived for a time on his plantation in southern Mississippi, later moving to Memphis, Tennessee, and finally to New York City.

Walworth contributed many stories to newspapers and periodicals. While writing for the Commercial Appeal, she used the pen name "Mother Goose", and she also was known by the pen name of "Ann Atom". Before marriage, she published Forgiven at Last (Philadelphia, 1870); The Silent Witness (1871); and Dead Men's Shoes (1872). After marriage, her works included Heavy Yokes (Boston, 1874); Nobody's Business (New York, 1878); The Bar Sinister (1885); Without Blemish (1885); Alice and Scruples (1886); At Bay (New York, 1887); The New Man at Rossmere (1887); Southern Silhouettes (New York, 1887); True to Herself (New York, 1888); That Girl from Texas (New York, 1888); Splendid Egotist (1889); and The Little Radical (1890).

== Personal life ==
Upon becoming widowed in 1915, she moved from New York City, where she had lived for sixteen years, to New Orleans, Louisiana to live with relatives. Walworth died February 4, 1918, in New Orleans.

== Selected works ==
- Forgiven at Last (1870)
- The Silent Witness (1871)
- Dead Men's Shoes (1872)
- Heavy Yokes (1874)
- Nobody's Business (1878)
- The Bar Sinister (1885)
- Without Blemish (1885)
- Alice and Scruples (1886)
- Uncle Scipio, a Story of Uncertain Days in the South
- At Bay (New York, 1887)
- The New Man at Rossmere (1887)
- Southern Silhouettes (1887)
- True to Herself (1888)
- That Girl from Texas (1888)
- Splendid Egotist (1889)
- The Little Radical (1890)
