= Sally Wood (writer) =

American novelist

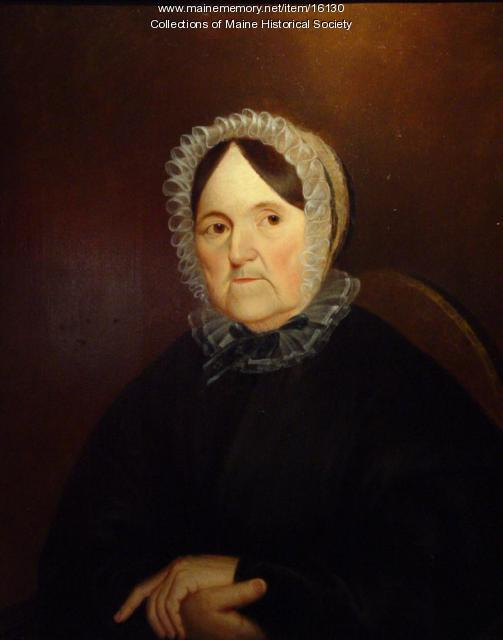
- Sally Wood circa 1820
- Born: Sarah Sayward Barrell Keating Wood; October 1, 1759; York, Maine
- Died: January 6, 1855 (aged 95)
- Occupation: Novelist
- Spouse(s): Richard Keating (1778–1783); General Abiel Wood (1804–1811)
- Children: 2 daughters and 1 son
- Writing career
- Pen name: A Lady of Massachusetts; A Lady of Maine, Madame Wood
- Language: English
- Genre: Gothic fiction

Sarah Sayward Barrell Keating Wood (October 1, 1759 – January 6, 1855) is considered the first American female writer of gothic fiction. She lived more than nine decades, authored four novels and one collection of tales, and was renowned as Maine's first novelist.

Wood was an author of gothic novels who wrote under the pen name "A Lady of Massachusetts". After Maine became a state in 1820, she changed her pen name to "A Lady of Maine." To her readers, however, she was better known as Madame Wood.

During Wood's extended period of widowhood, she wrote four novels and gained popularity in New England.

== Life ==
Wood was born in York, Maine, the first daughter of Sarah Sayward Barrell and the British army officer Nathaniel Barrell, but was heavily influenced by her wealthy grandfather, Judge Jonathan Sayward. She grew up at the Barrell Homestead, a substantial building still standing.

On October 23, 1778 she married Richard Keating, who died of a fever five years later. The couple had two daughters and a son. She married General Abiel Wood on October 28, 1804. He died in 1811, and Wood thereafter moved to Portland, Maine.

== Career ==
Wood's published works include: Julia and the Illuminated Baron (1800); Dorval; or The Speculator (1801); Amelia; or The Influence of Virtue (1802); Ferdinand and Elmira: A Russian Story (1804); and Tales of the Night (1827). A facsimile edition of Tales of the Night was published in 1982 as part of the sesquicentennial observances of Westbrook College. Wood's writing career falls into two distinct phases, both of which occurred during her periods of widowhood. This fact, and the prefaces to her books, suggests she felt a certain ambivalence about female authorship. Her books were published anonymously, and according to the University of New England's Maine Women Writers Collection, "she makes it perfectly clear that her womanly duties were never neglected."

The books are now rare items, but there is a complete set in the Maine State Library at Augusta. She also wrote letters, including some "recollections" of her youth and family traditions, as well as a short narrative, probably based on these recollections, that was never published. The manuscript of this work, "War, the Parent of Domestic Calamity: A Tale of the Revolution," is at the Library of the Maine Historical Society in Portland. Other letters are extant in family attics, and a poem is in the Old Gaol Museum in York.

Wood, desiring anonymity, wrote and published under pseudonyms. On the title pages of her first four books, she was identified as either "A Lady" or "A Lady from Massachusetts." Since her last book was published after Maine became a state in 1820, she was identified as "A Lady from Maine" on its title page.

== Bibliography ==
- Julia and the Illuminated Baron. (Oracle Press, 1800)
- Dorval; or, the Speculator. (Ledger Press, 1801)
- Amelia; or, the Influence of Virtue, an Old Man's Story. (Oracle Press, 1802)
- Ferdinand and Elmira: A Russian Story. (J.W. Butler, 1804)
- Tales of the Night. (Thomas Todd, 1827)
