= List of people from Massachusetts =

State flag of Massachusetts

Location of Massachusetts in the United States

This is a list of people who were born in/raised in, lived in, or have significant relations with the American state of Massachusetts. It includes both notable people born in the Commonwealth, and other notable people who are from the Commonwealth. People from Massachusetts are called "Massachusettsans" or "Bay Staters" after the Commonwealth's nickname.

== Artists ==
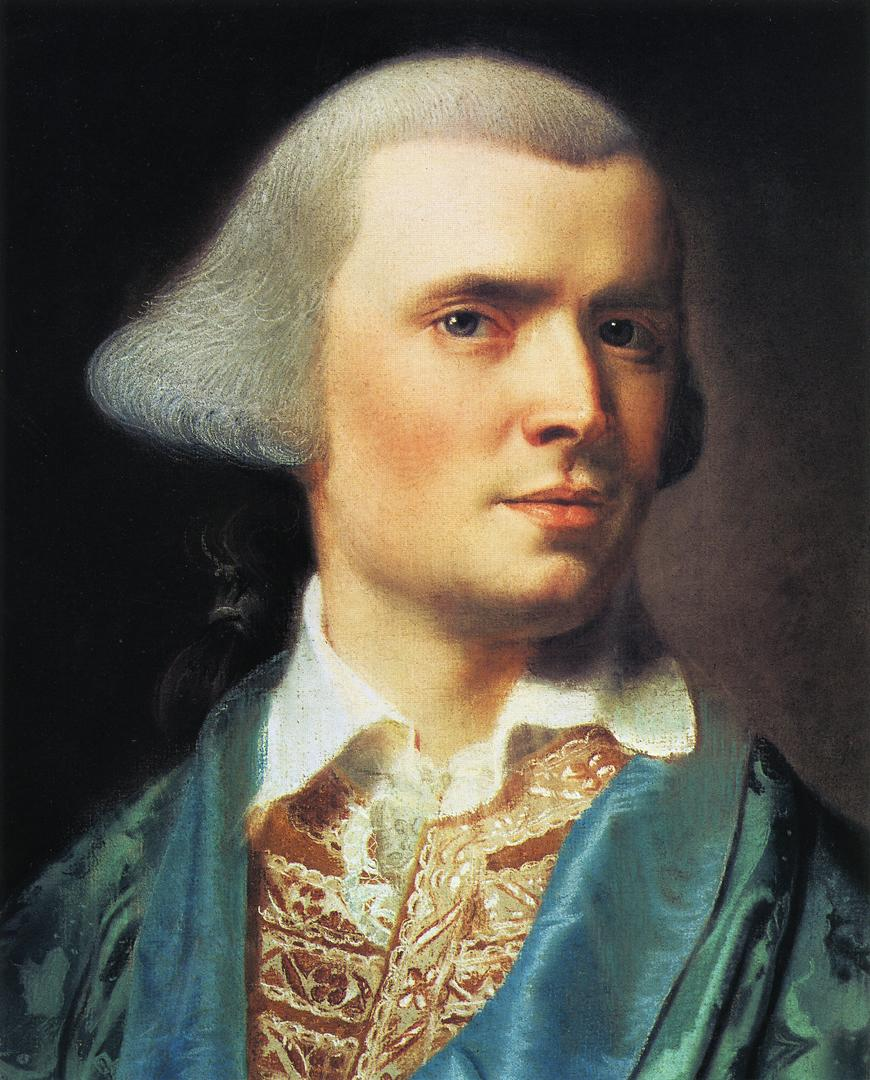
John Singleton Copley

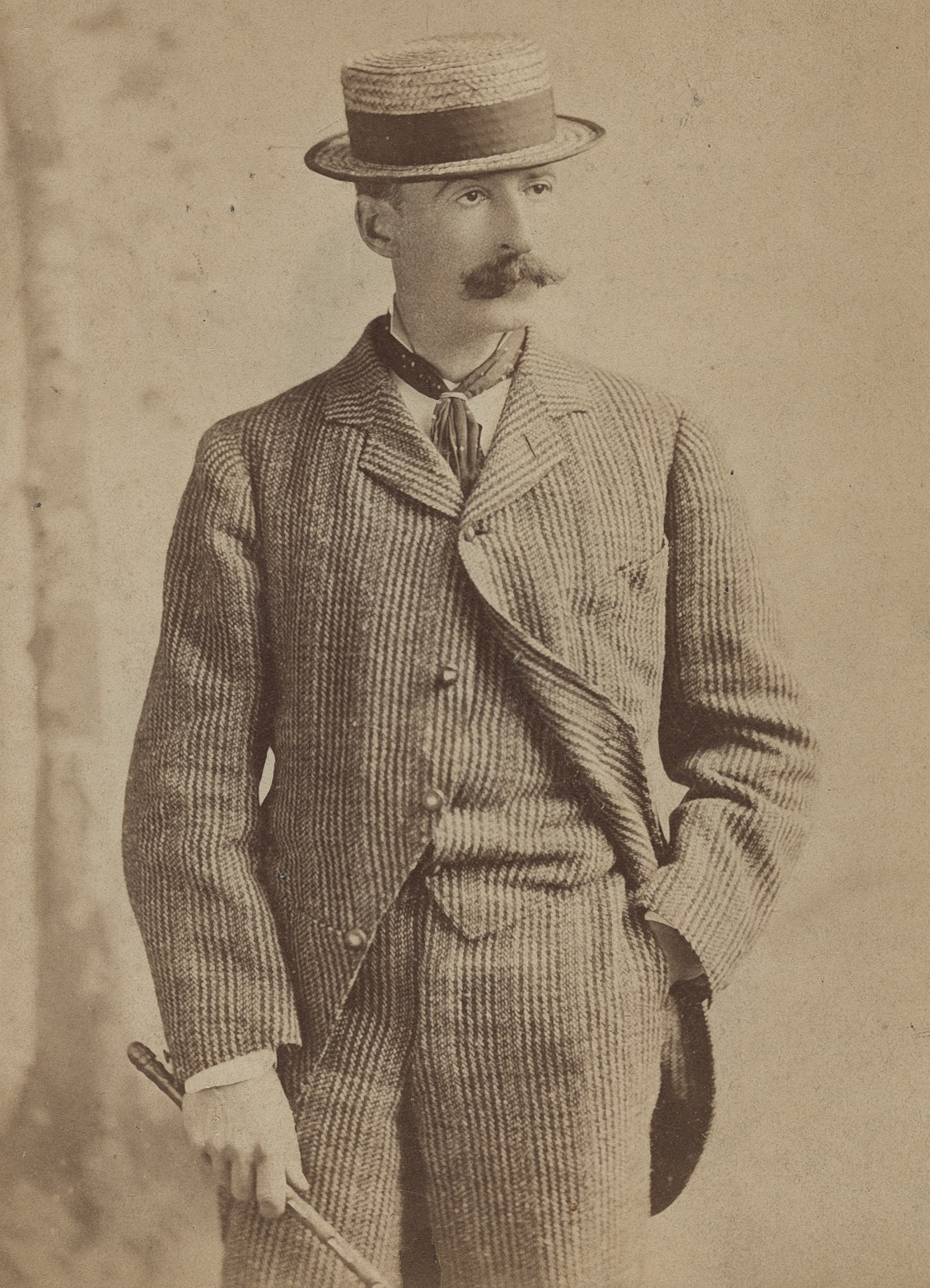
Winslow Homer

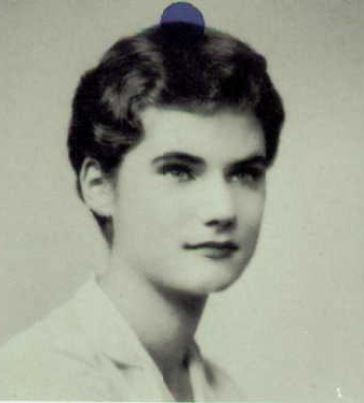
Nancy Graves

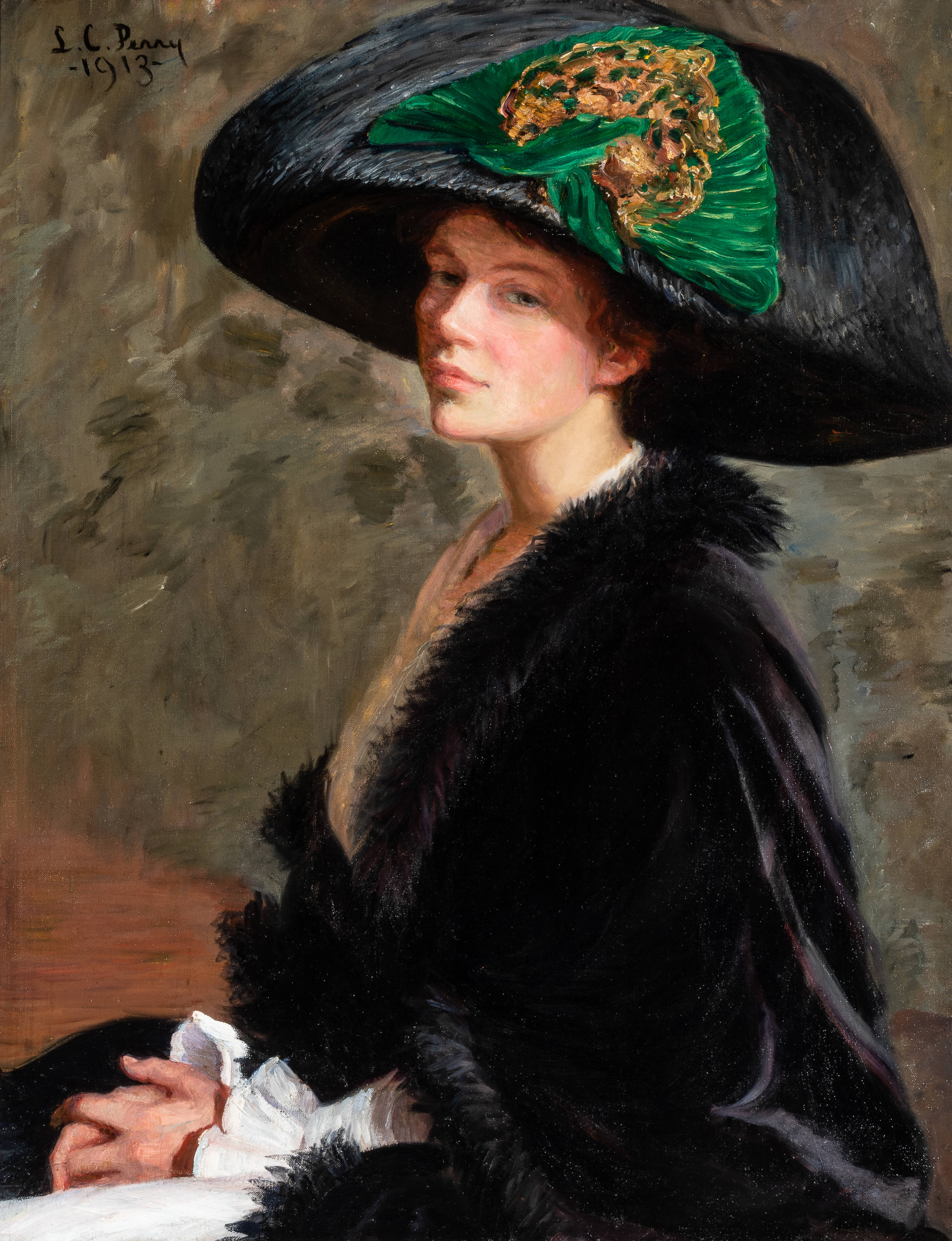
Lilla Cabot Perry

- John Wolcott Adams (1874–1925) – illustrator
- Harvey Ball (1921–2001) – inventor of the smiley face
- Will Barnet (1911–2012) – painter
- Kimberly Barzola – muralist
- Frank Weston Benson (1862–1951) – painter
- Dawn Clements (1958–2018) – artist
- George Condo (born 1957) – artist and sculptor
- John Singleton Copley (1738–1815) – painter
- Thomas Dewing (1851–1938) – painter
- Charles Dana Gibson (1867–1944) – graphic artist
- Duff Goldman (born 1974) – cake artist
- Nancy Graves (1939–1995) – sculptor, painter, engraver and film director
- Childe Hassam (1859–1935) – painter
- Winslow Homer (1836–1910)– painter
- Peter Laird (born 1954) – co-creator of the comic book Teenage Mutant Ninja Turtles
- Fitzhugh Lane (1804–1865) – painter
- Jack Levine (1915–2010) – painter
- Shawn McManus (born 1958) – comic book artist
- Willard Metcalf (1858–1925) – painter
- Tony Millionaire (born 1956) – cartoonist, illustrator
- Porsha Olayiwola (born 1988) – Boston poet laureate
- Lilla Cabot Perry (1848–1933) – impressionist
- Ted Rall (born 1963) – political cartoonist
- Robert Reid (1862–1929) – painter
- René Ricard (1946–2014) – poet, art critic, painter
- Norman Rockwell (1894–1978) – artist
- Paul Ryan (1949–2016) – cartoonist
- Albert Pinkham Ryder (1847–1917) – painter
- Mark Shasha (born 1961) – painter, author
- Edward Simmons (1852–1931) – painter
- Frank Stella (born 1936) – artist
- Andrew Stevovich (born 1948) – artist
- Barbara Swan (1922–2003) – artist
- Edmund Charles Tarbell (1862–1938) – painter
- Abbott Handerson Thayer (1849–1921) – painter
- James Abbott McNeill Whistler (1834–1903) – artist
- N. C. Wyeth (1882–1945) (1882–1945) – artist

=== Architects ===
- Lucius W. Briggs (1866–1940) – architect
- Charles Bulfinch (1763–1844) – architect
- Elias Carter (1781–1864) – architect
- Theophilus P. Chandler Jr. (1845–1928) – architect
- Josephine Wright Chapman (1867–1943) – architect
- Charles Amos Cummings (1833−1905) – architect
- Stephen C. Earle (1839–1913) – architect
- William LeBaron Jenney (1832–1907) – architect
- Samuel McIntire (1757–1811) – architect
- Robert Swain Peabody (1845–1917) – architect
- Josep Lluís Sert (1902–1983) – Spanish architect; dean of Harvard Graduate School of Design
- John Goddard Stearns Jr. (1843–1917) – architect

=== Sculptors ===
- Russell Gerry Crook (1869–1955) – sculptor
- Cyrus Edwin Dallin (1861–1944) – sculptor; Olympic archer; namesake of Cyrus E. Dallin Art Museum
- Murray Dewart (born 1947) – sculptor
- Daniel Chester French (1850–1931) – neoclassical sculptor
- Joseph Skinger (1911–1967) – metalsmith and sculptor

== Athletes ==
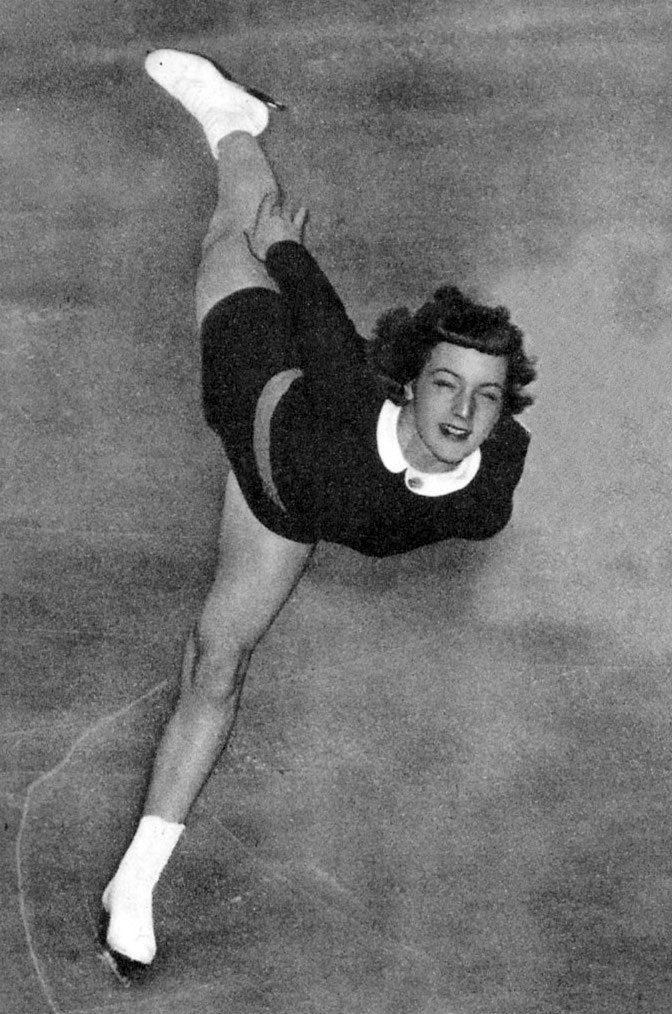
Tenley Albright

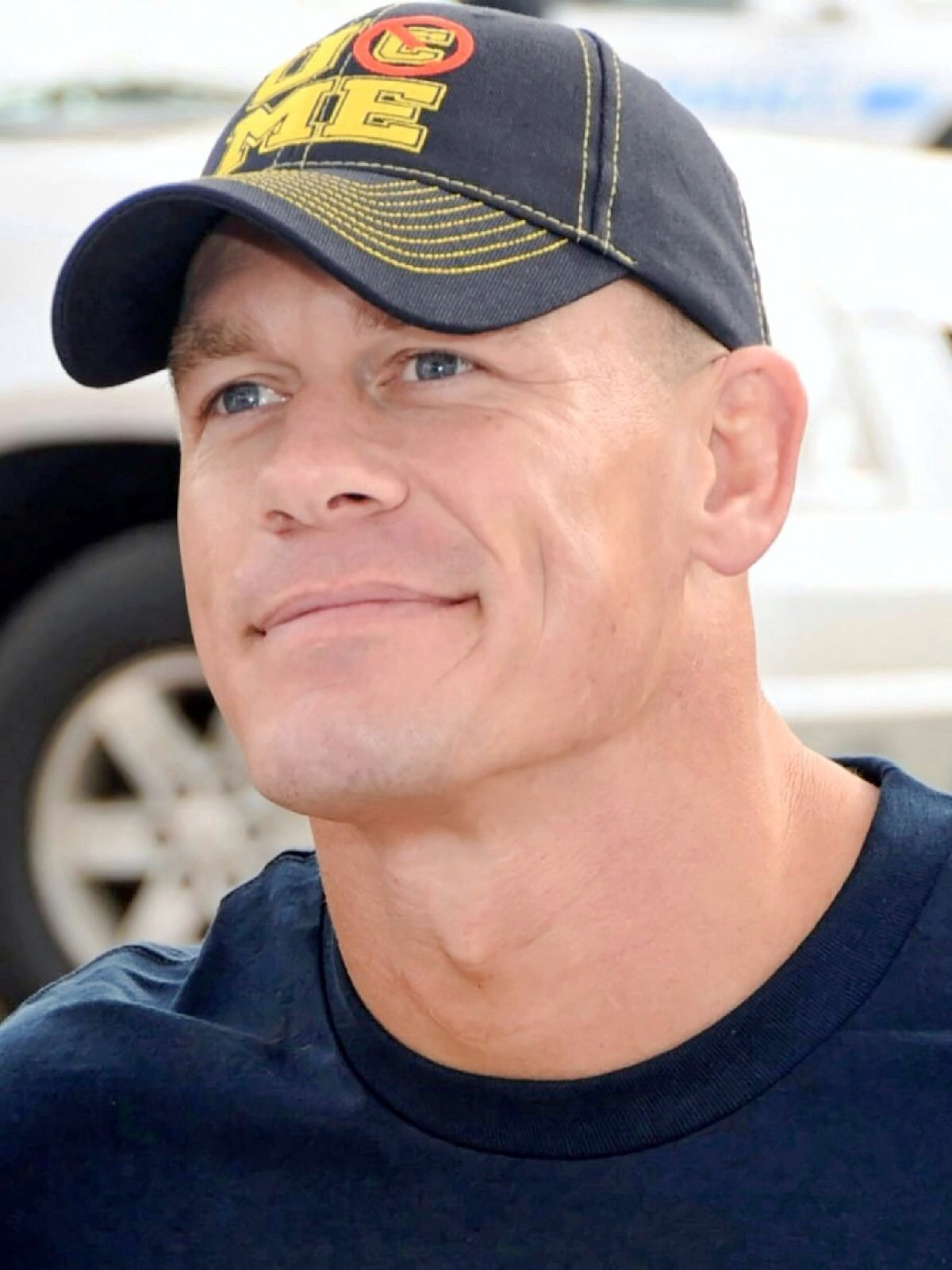
John Cena

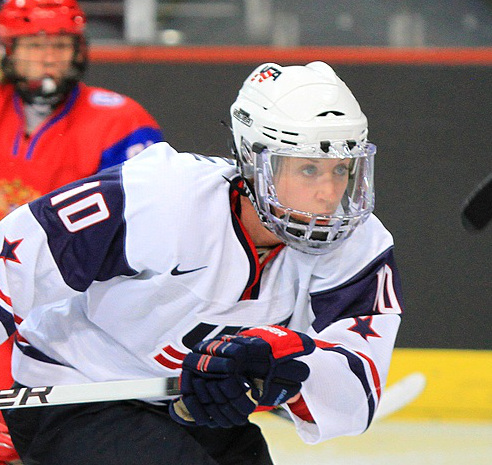
Meghan Duggan

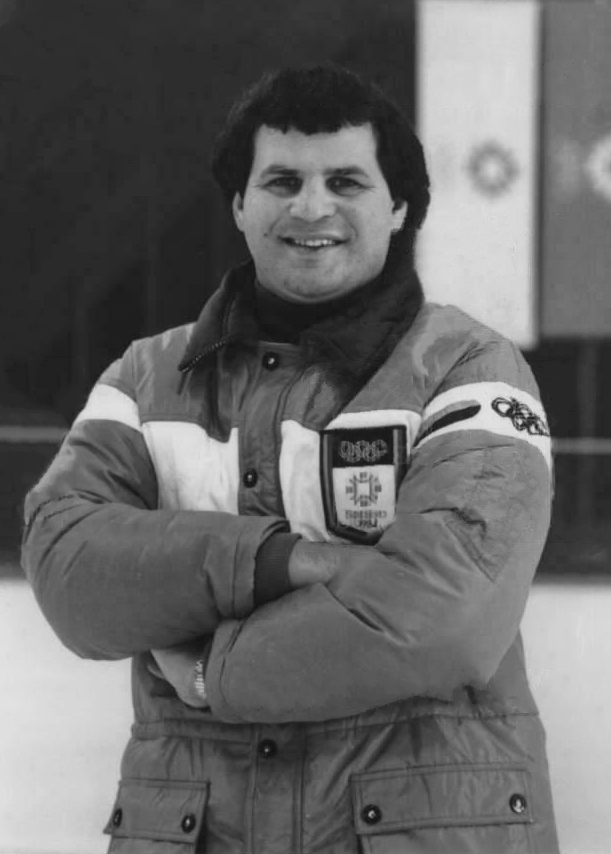
Mike Eruzione

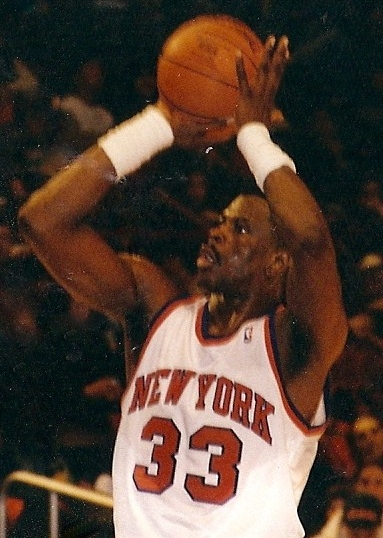
Patrick Ewing

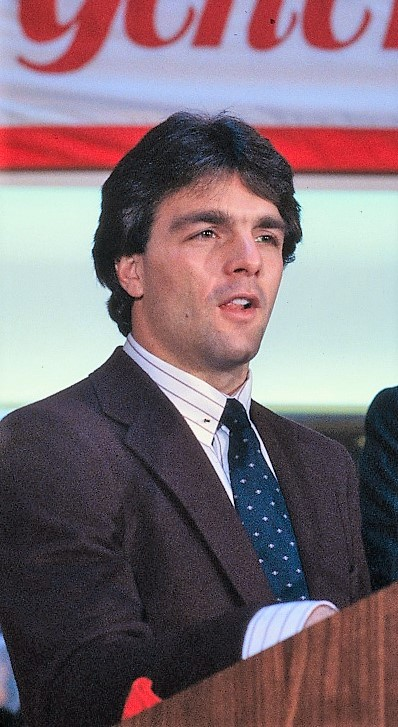
Doug Flutie

=== A–F ===
- Abdul-Malik Abu (born 1995), basketball player in the Israeli Premier Basketball League
- Kim Adler − bowler
- Harry Agganis (1929–1955) − baseball player
- Nick Ahmed − baseball player
- Tenley Albright – Olympic figure skater
- Kiko Alonso − football player
- Tony Amonte − hockey player
- Prince Amukamara − football player
- Jim Arvanitis − martial artist, MMA trainer
- Paul Azinger − golfer, television commentator
- Jerry Azumah − football player
- Jeff Bagwell (born 1968) − baseball player
- Sasha Banks − professional wrestler, ring name Mercedes Kaestner-Varnado
- Tom Barrasso − hockey player
- Dana Barros − basketball player
- Mark Bavaro − football player
- Tyler Beede − baseball player
- Joe Bellino − football player, Heisman Trophy winner
- Mackenzy Bernadeau − football player
- Travis Best − basketball player
- David Blatt (born 1959) − basketball player and coach
- Brian Boyle − hockey player
- Edward Scott Bozek (1950–2022) − Olympic épée fencer
- Ron Brace − football player
- John Brebbia − baseball player
- Andy Brickley − hockey player
- Charles Brickley − football player and coach
- Aimee Buchanan (born 1993) − Olympic figure skater
- Nick Buoniconti − Hall of Fame football player
- Thomas Burke – Olympic sprinter (first gold medalist in 100 meter dash, 1896 Athens)
- Geoff Cameron – U.S. soccer player
- Chris Capuano − baseball pitcher
- Mary Carew − sprinter, Olympic gold medalist
- Michael Carter-Williams − basketball player
- Brett Cecil − baseball player
- John Cena − professional wrestler
- Jacques Cesaire − football player
- Gosder Cherilus − football player
- Jack Chesbro − Hall of Fame baseball player
- Alex Cobb − baseball player
- Mickey Cochrane − Hall of Fame baseball player
- Chris Colabello − baseball player
- Tim Collins − baseball player
- Todd Collins − football player
- Marc Colombo − football player
- Tony Conigliaro (1945–1990) − baseball player
- James Brendan Connolly – Olympic champion (triple jump)
- Stephen Cooper − football player
- Charlie Coyle − hockey player
- Jim Craig − USA Olympic hockey player, 1980 Lake Placid
- Honey Craven − equestrian
- Candy Cummings − Hall of Fame baseball player
- Tim Daggett − gymnast
- Ron Darling − baseball pitcher, television commentator
- Vinny Del Negro − basketball player, head coach
- Tony DeMarco − welterweight champion boxer
- Zak DeOssie − football player for New York Giants
- Eli Dershwitz (born 1995) − 2023 World Saber Champion, 2015 Under-20 World Saber Champion, and US Olympic saber fencer
- Mike DeVito − football player for Kansas City Chiefs
- Oliver Drake − baseball pitcher
- Rich Dubee − baseball coach
- Meghan Duggan – ice hockey player
- Leo Durocher (1905–1991) − Hall of Fame baseball manager
- Jack Eichel – hockey player
- Mike Eruzione − Olympic hockey player, 1980 Lake Placid
- Carl Etelman (1900–1963) − football back and coach
- Patrick Ewing − Hall of Fame basketball player
- Mark Fidrych − baseball pitcher, 1976 AL Rookie of the Year
- L. J. Figueroa (born 1998) - Dominican-American basketball player in the Israeli Basketball Premier League
- Jake Fishman − American-Israeli baseball pitcher for the Miami Marlins and Team Israel
- Ray Fitzgerald − baseball player
- Kenny Florian − UFC Fighter
- Doug Flutie − NFL quarterback, CFL Hall of Famer, Heisman Trophy winner
- Nate Freiman (born 1986) − baseball player

=== G–L ===
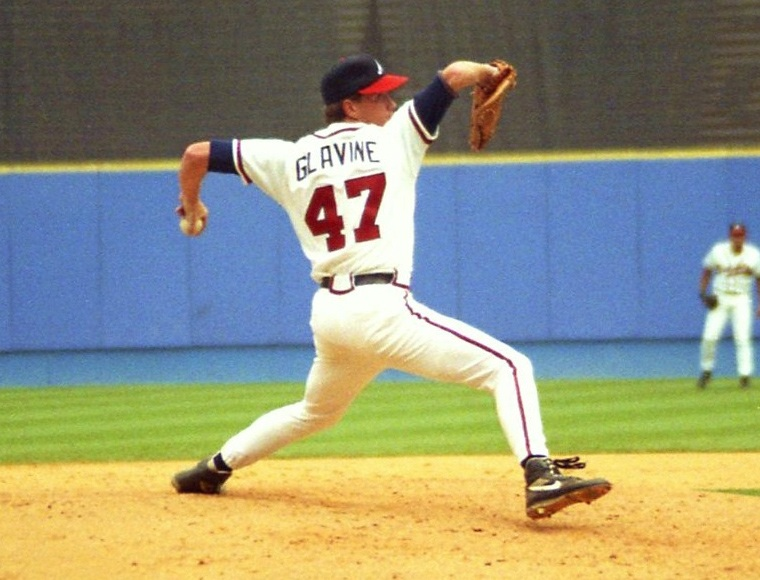
Tom Glavine

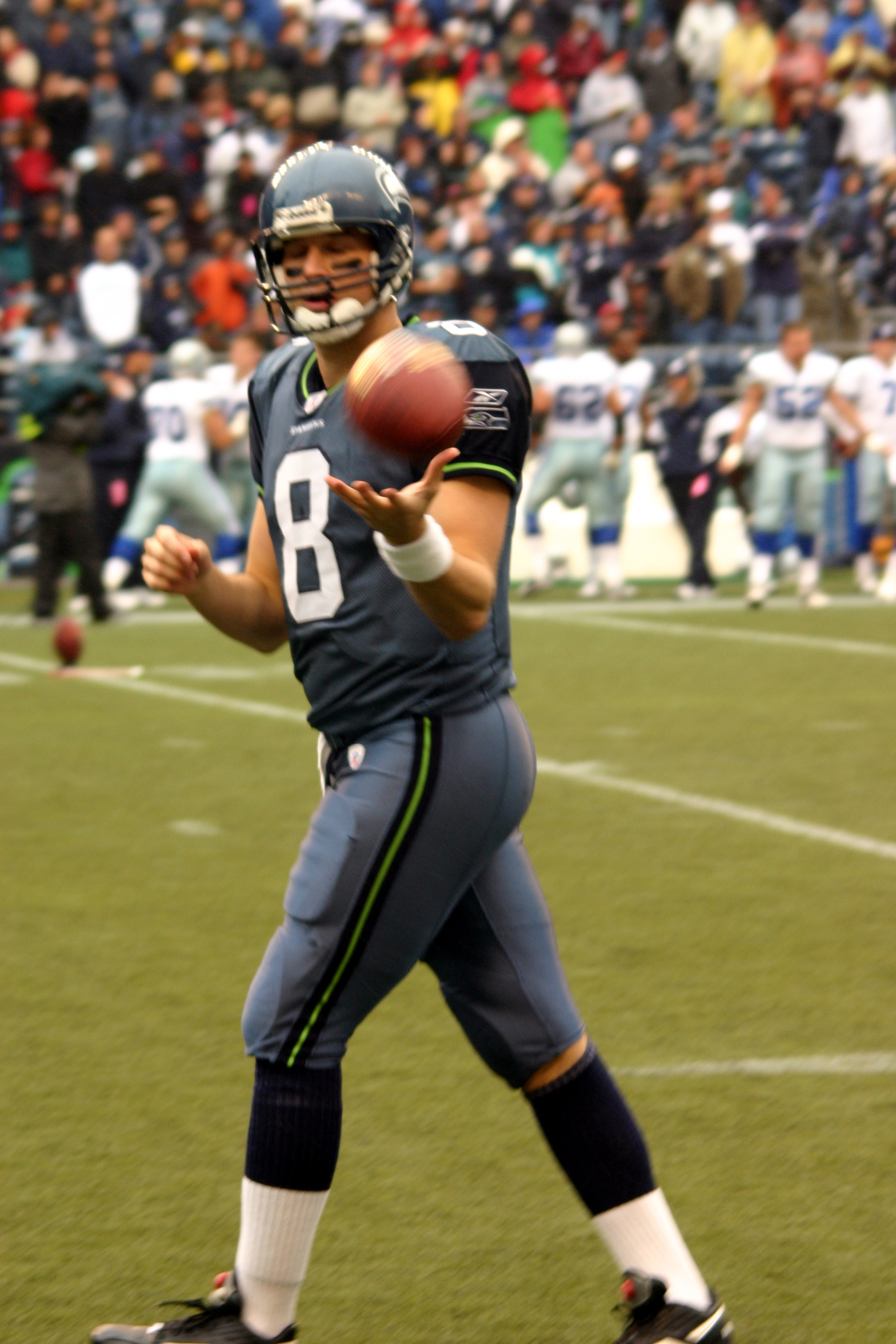
Matt Hasselbeck

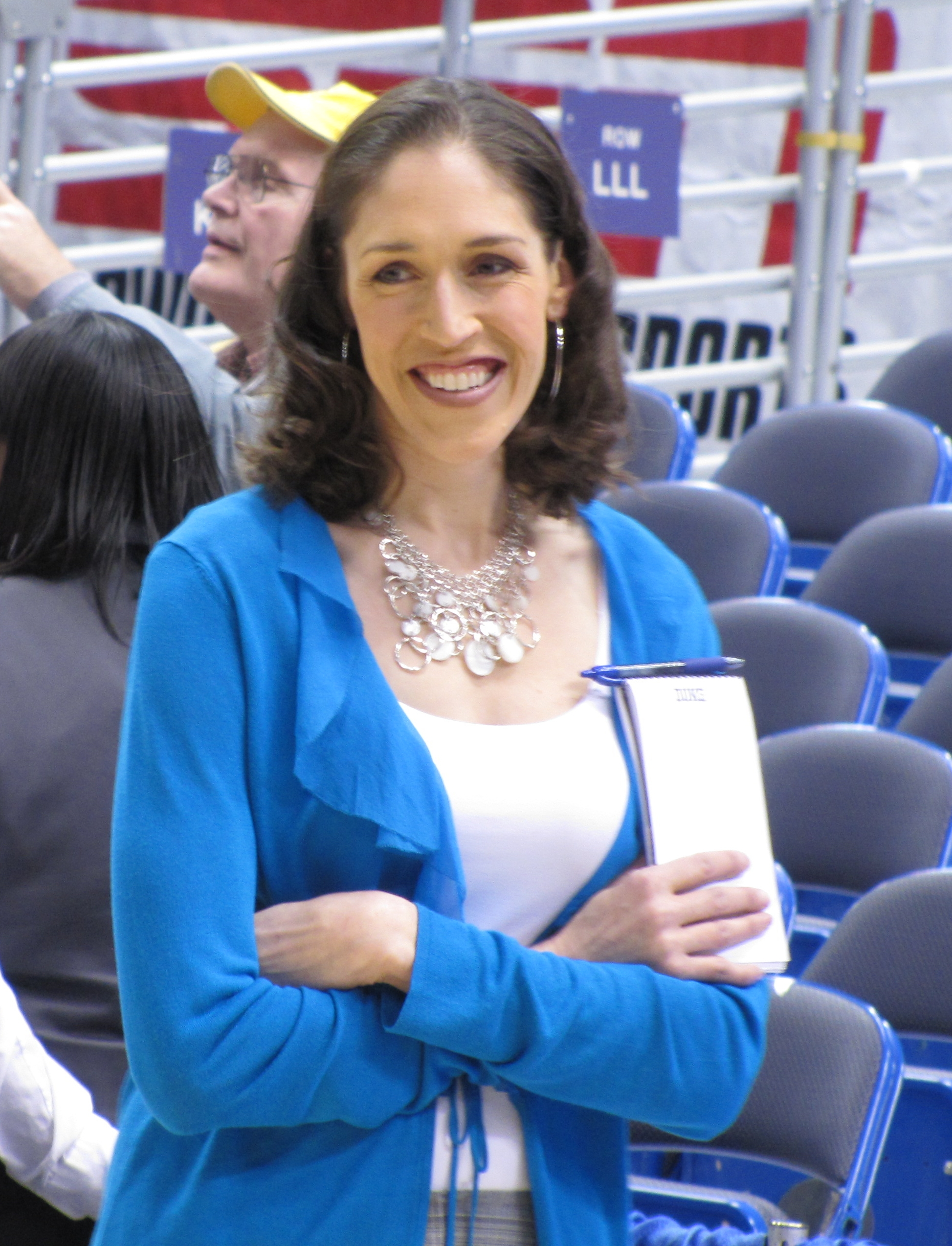
Rebecca Lobo

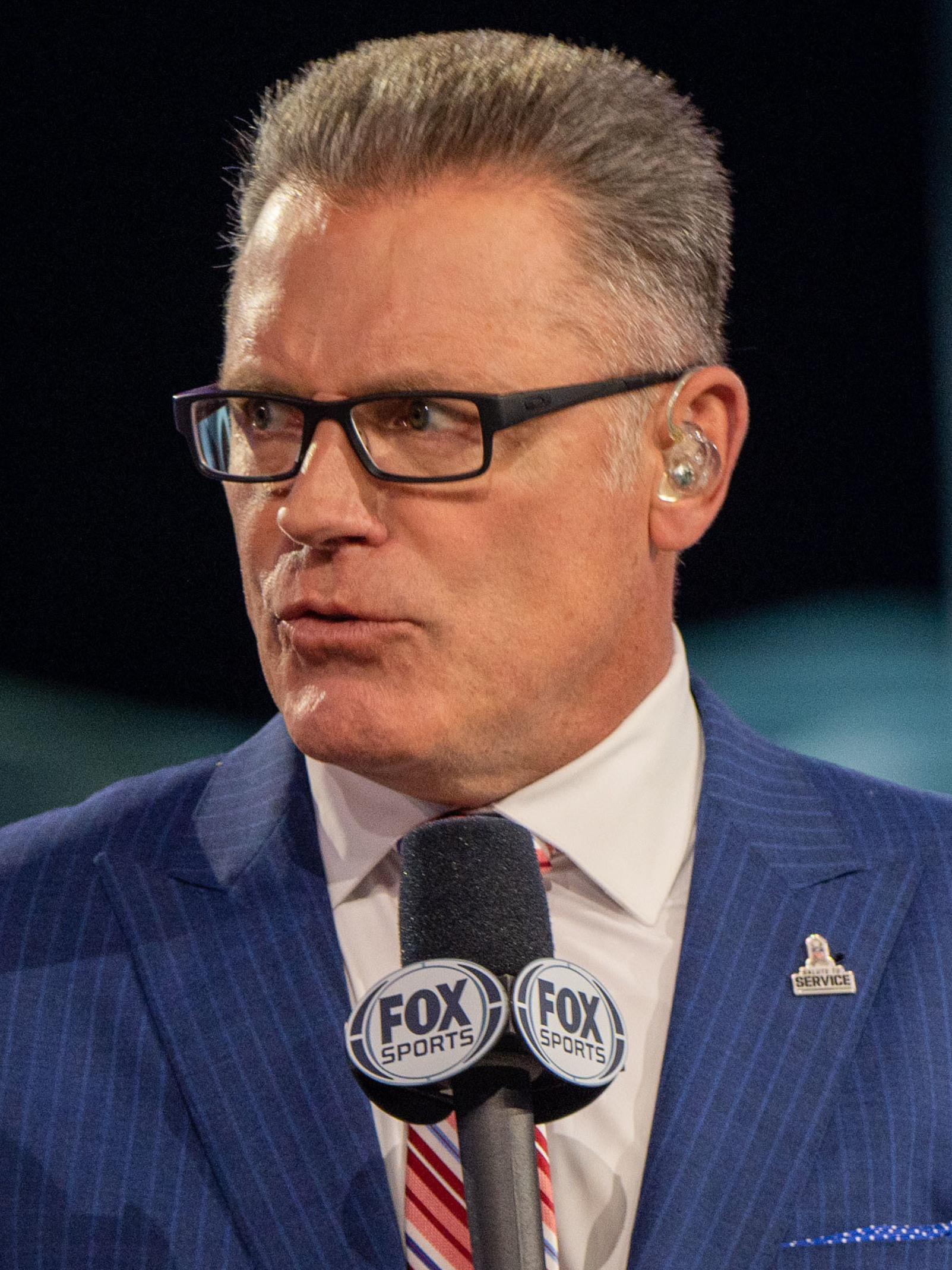
Howie Long

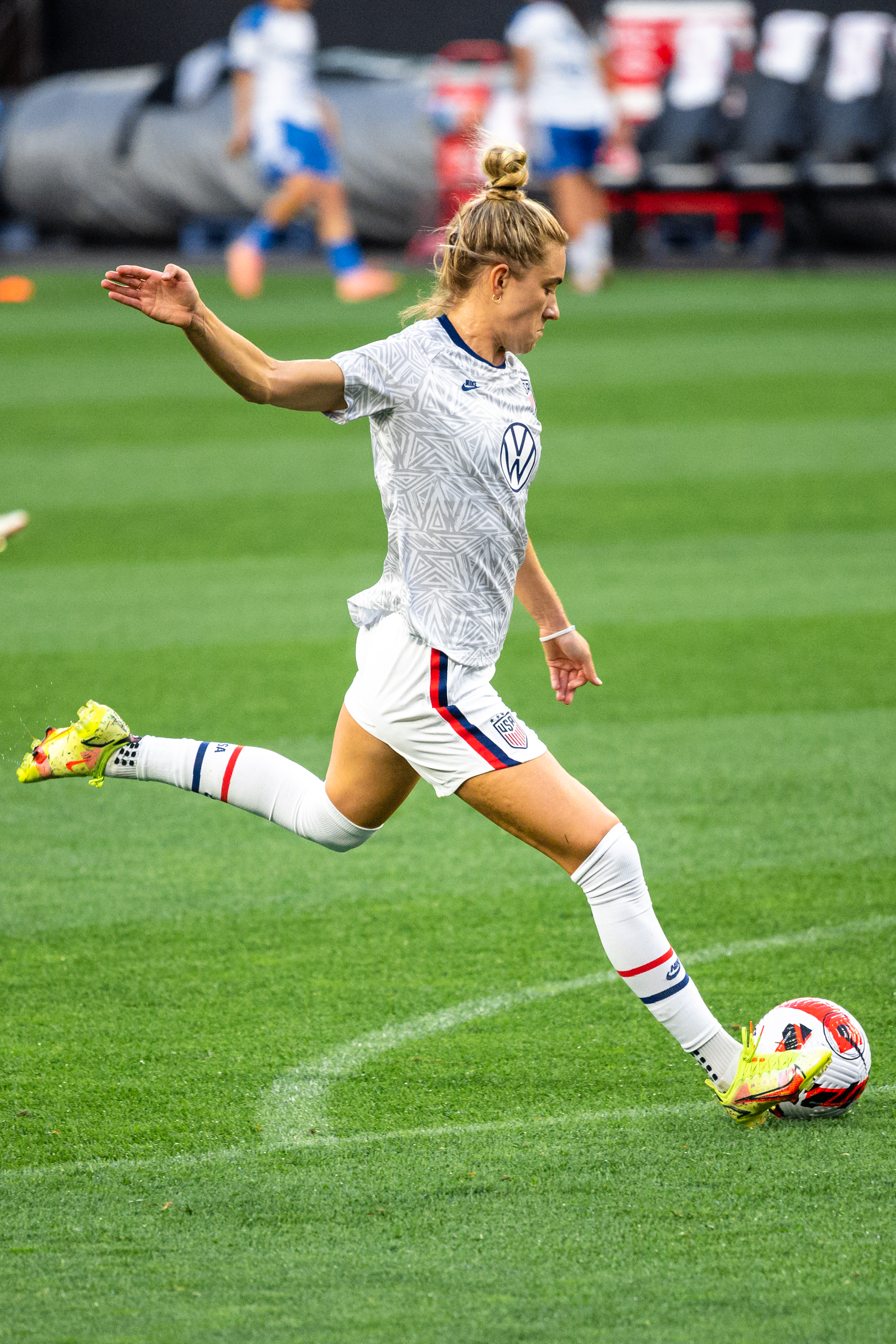
Kristie Mewis

- Tony Gaffney (born 1984) – basketball player
- Breno Giacomini − football player
- Peter Giunta − football coach
- Tom Glavine − Hall of Fame baseball pitcher
- Jared Goldberg − Olympic skier
- Billy Gonsalves – U.S. soccer player
- Colin Grafton − figure skater
- Kaz Grala – NASCAR driver
- Frank Grant − Hall of Fame baseball player
- Geoffrey Gray (born 1997) – American-Israeli professional basketball player
- Mike Grier − ice hockey player
- Josh Grispi − WEC fighter
- Matt Grzelcyk − hockey player
- Bill Guerin − hockey player
- Marvin Hagler (1954–2021) – middleweight champion boxer
- Pete Hamilton − NASCAR driver
- Jordan Harris (born 2000) − NHL hockey player for the Montreal Canadiens
- Matt Hasselbeck − football player
- Tim Hasselbeck − football player
- Steve Hathaway − baseball pitcher
- Steven Hauschka − football player
- Carmelo Hayes − professional wrestler
- Ed Healey − NFL Hall of Fame player for Chicago Bears
- Chris Herren − basketball player
- Rich Hill − baseball pitcher
- James Ihedigbo − football player
- Tim Keefe − 19th-century baseball pitcher
- Nancy Kerrigan − Olympic figure skater
- Kofi Kingston − WWE wrestler
- Joe Lauzon − UFC fighter
- Peter Laviolette − hockey player, head coach
- Erika Lawler − US national hockey team
- Michael Leach − tennis player
- Dana LeVangie − baseball player, coach
- Rebecca Lobo – basketball player
- Howie Long − Hall of Fame football player, sportscaster

=== M–R ===
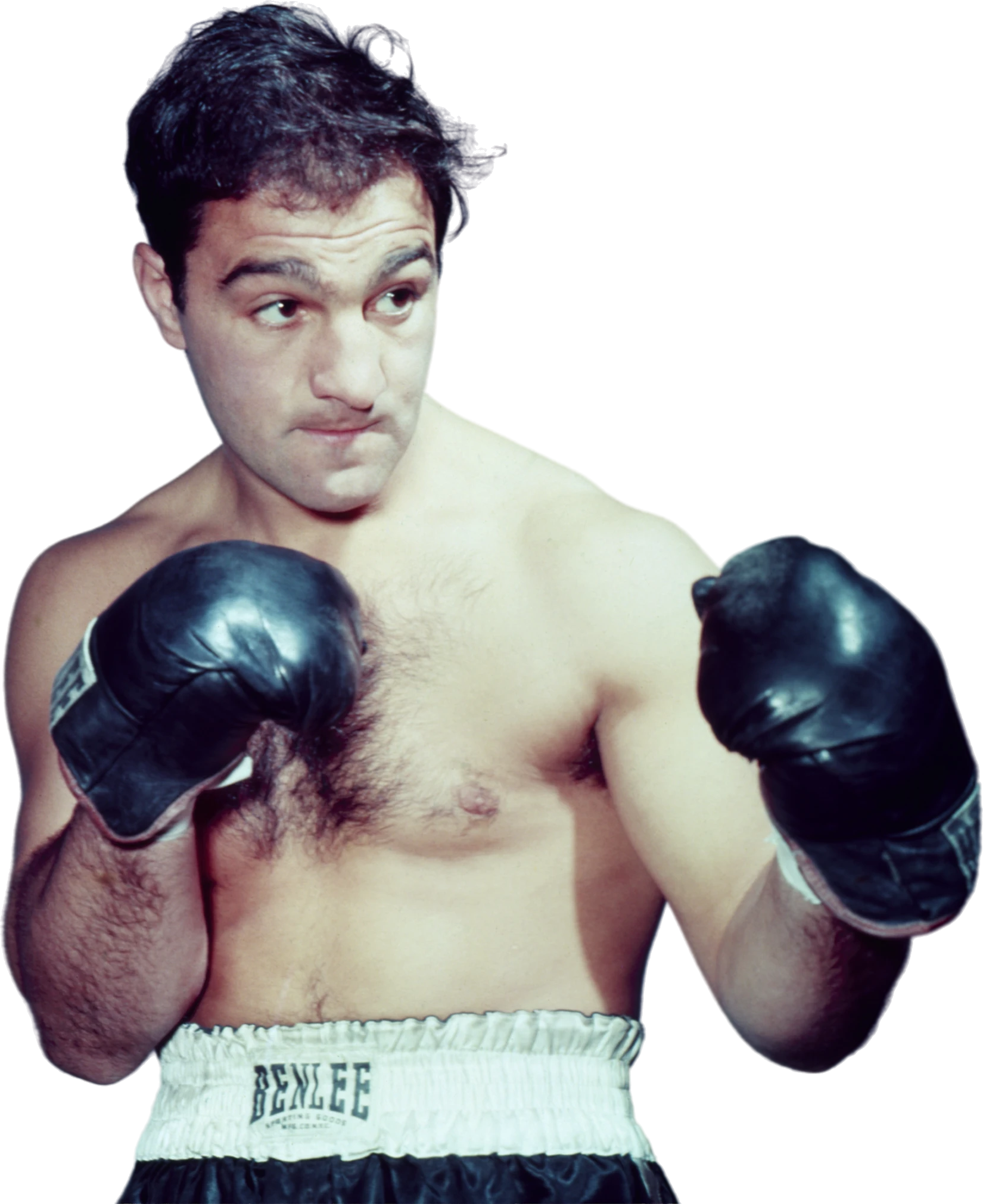
Rocky Marciano

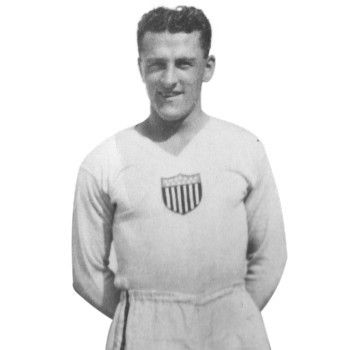
Bert Patenaude

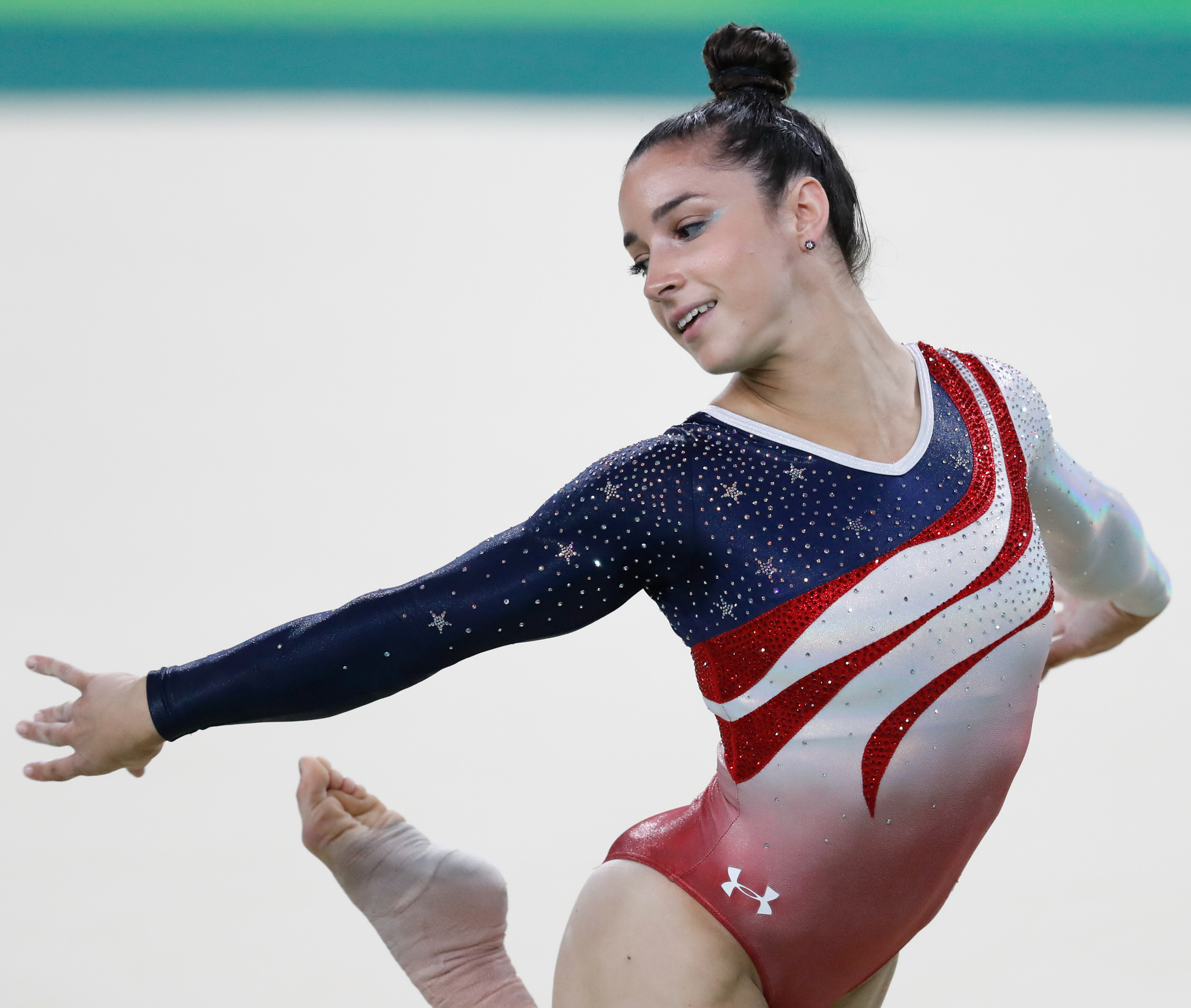
Aly Raisman

- Connie Mack − Hall of Fame baseball manager
- Andrew Mackiewicz (born 1995) − Olympic saber fencer
- Rabbit Maranville − Hall of Fame baseball player
- Rocky Marciano − undefeated world heavyweight boxing champion
- Obi Melifonwu − football player
- Lou Merloni − baseball player
- Kristie Mewis – United States national soccer team player
- Sam Mewis – United States national soccer team player
- Mike Milbury − hockey player and coach
- Wayne Millner − Hall of Fame football player and coach
- Ross Miner (born 1991) – skating coach and retired competitive figure skater
- Joe Nash – football player
- Sean Newcomb − basketball player
- Nerlens Noel − basketball player
- Ryan O'Rourke − baseball player
- Rob Oppenheim − professional golfer
- Francis Ouimet − golfer
- Jay Pandolfo − hockey player
- Bert Patenaude – U.S. soccer player (first hat-trick in the World Cup history)
- Craig Patrick − hockey player
- Carlos Peña − baseball player
- Joe Philbin − football coach
- Elena Pirozhkova – Olympic freestyle wrestler
- Tom Poti − hockey player
- John Quinlan − professional wrestler
- Joe Ragland (born 1989) – American-Liberian basketball player
- Aly Raisman (born 1994) − Olympic gymnast
- Jeff Reardon − baseball player
- Jerry Remy − baseball player, broadcaster
- Patrick Ricard − football player
- Jorge Rivera − UFC fighter
- Richard Rodgers − football player
- Jeremy Roenick − hockey player
- Dan Ross − football player

=== S–Z ===
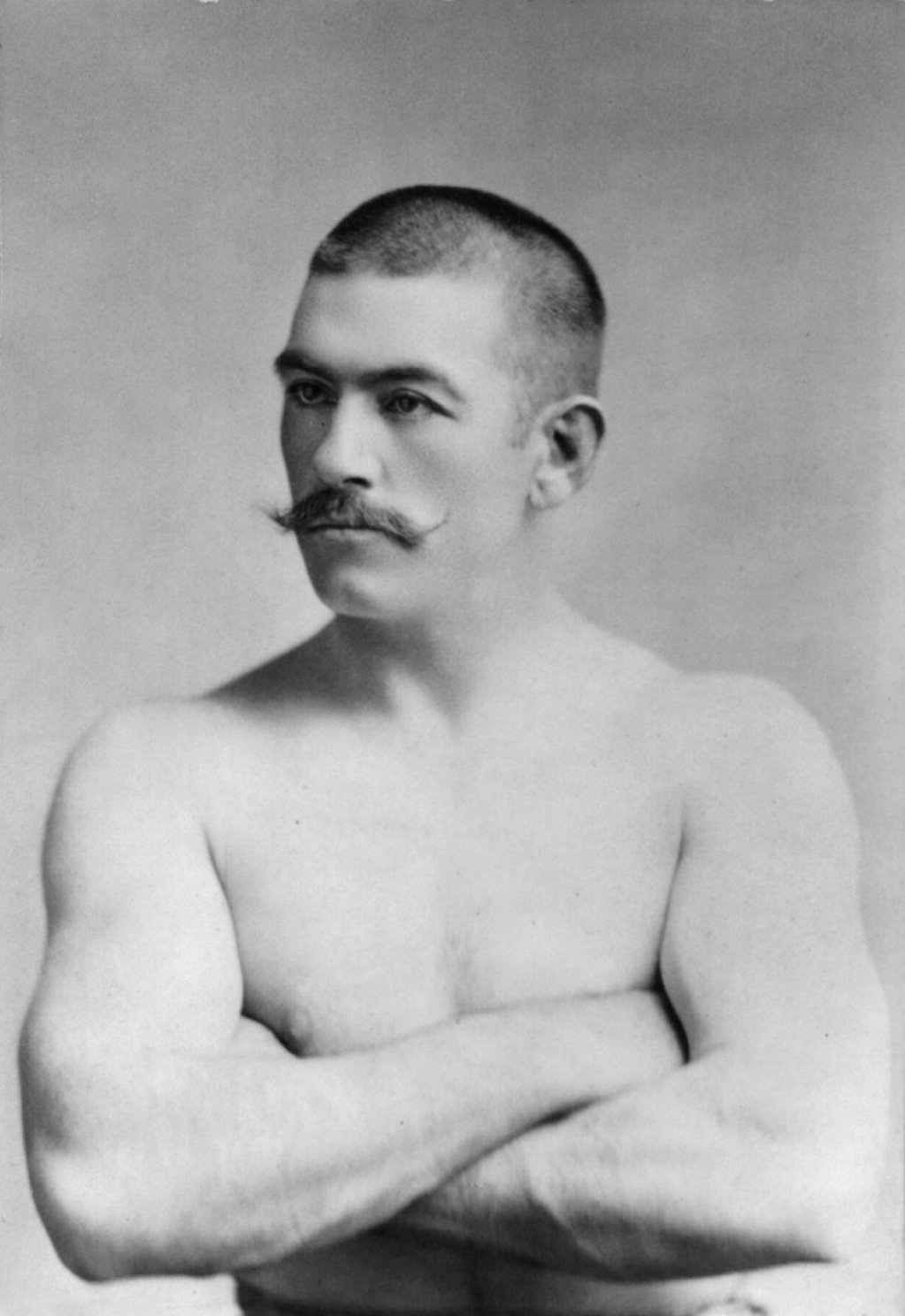
John L. Sullivan

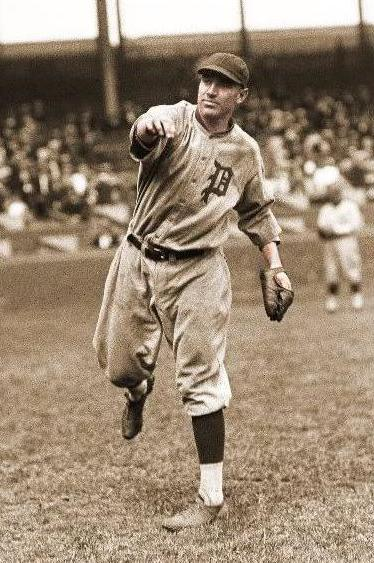
Pie Traynor

- Joe Sacco − hockey player
- Alicia Sacramone − Olympic gymnast
- Sandy Saddler − champion boxer
- Alberto Salazar (born 1958) – distance runner and athletics coach banned for life
- Keith Sanderson (born 1975) – sport shooter
- Cory Schneider − hockey player
- Wayne Selden Jr. (born 1994) – basketball player
- Anthony Sherman − NFL player
- Simon Shnapir − Olympic medalist pairs skater
- Jarrod Shoemaker − triathlete
- Jared Shuster (born 1998) − Atlanta Braves baseball pitcher
- Jack Sharkey − world heavyweight boxing champion
- John L. Sullivan − first world heavyweight boxing champion
- Harry Swartz (born 1996) − soccer player
- Lofa Tatupu − football player
- Jared Terrell (born 1995) − basketball player in the Israeli Basketball Premier League
- John Thomas – U.S. Olympian (high jump)
- Keith Tkachuk − hockey player
- Jordan Todman − football player
- Pie Traynor − Hall of Fame baseball player
- Mark van Eeghen − football player
- Jimmy Vesey − hockey player
- Noah Vonleh − basketball player
- Pete Walker − baseball pitcher, coach
- Ben Wanger – American-Israeli baseball pitcher
- Micky Ward − boxer
- David Warsofsky − National Hockey League player
- Ryan Warsofsky (born 1987) − ice hockey player and NHL ice hockey coach
- Turk Wendell − baseball pitcher
- Jerry White − baseball player
- Ryan Whitney − hockey player, Spittin' Chiclets podcast host
- Jamila Wideman − basketball player, lawyer, and activist
- Jermaine Wiggins − football player
- Brian Wilson − baseball pitcher
- Mark Wohlers − baseball pitcher
- Wilbur Wood − baseball pitcher
- Willy Workman (born 1990) − American-Israeli basketball player

== Business ==
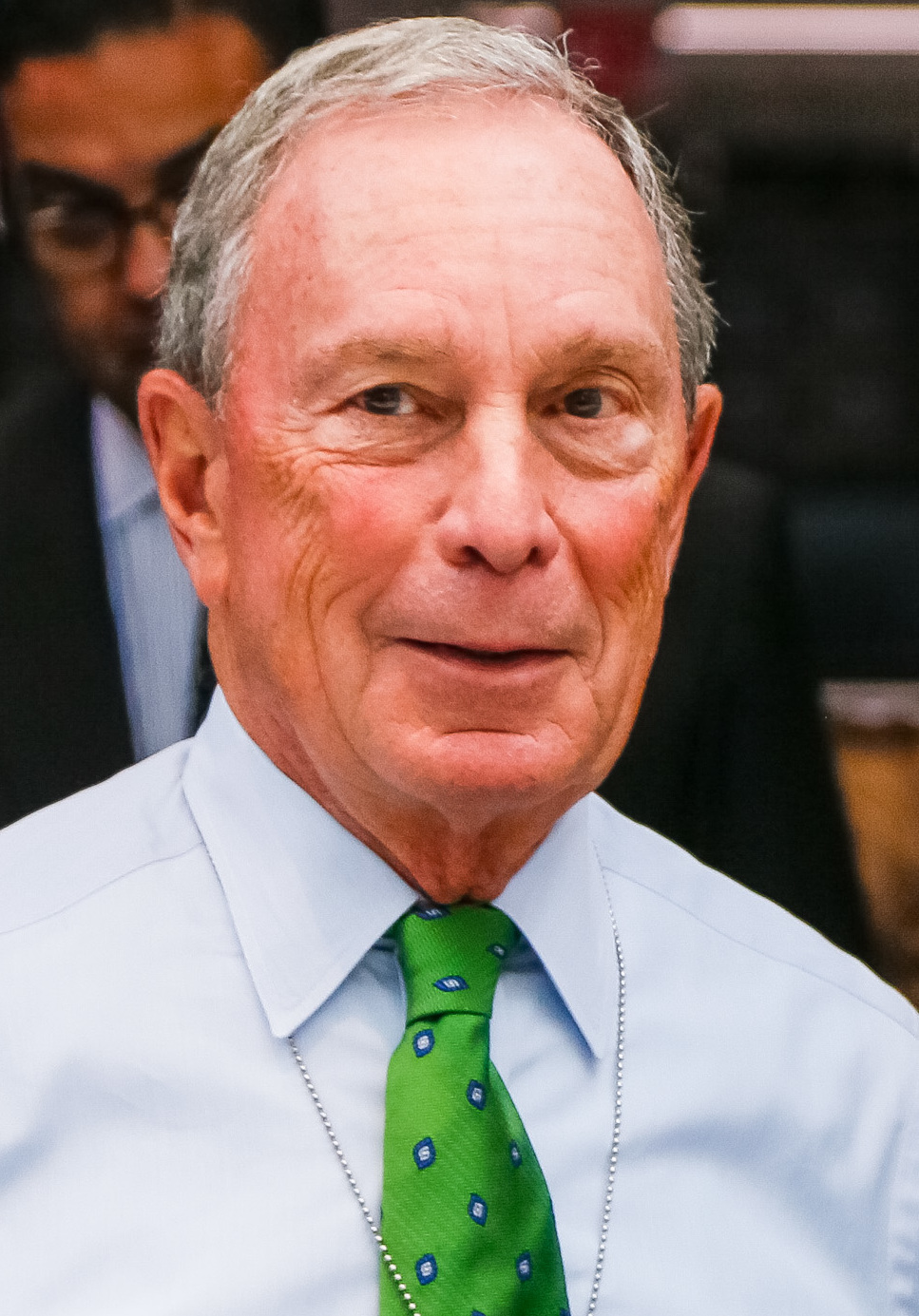
Michael Bloomberg

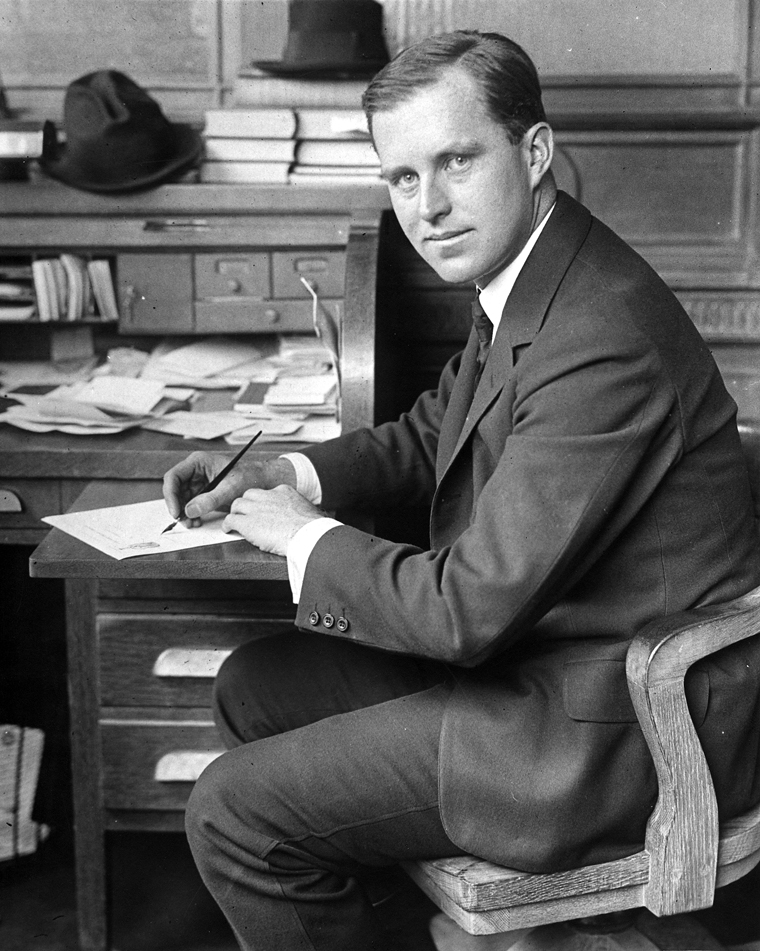
Joseph P. Kennedy Sr.

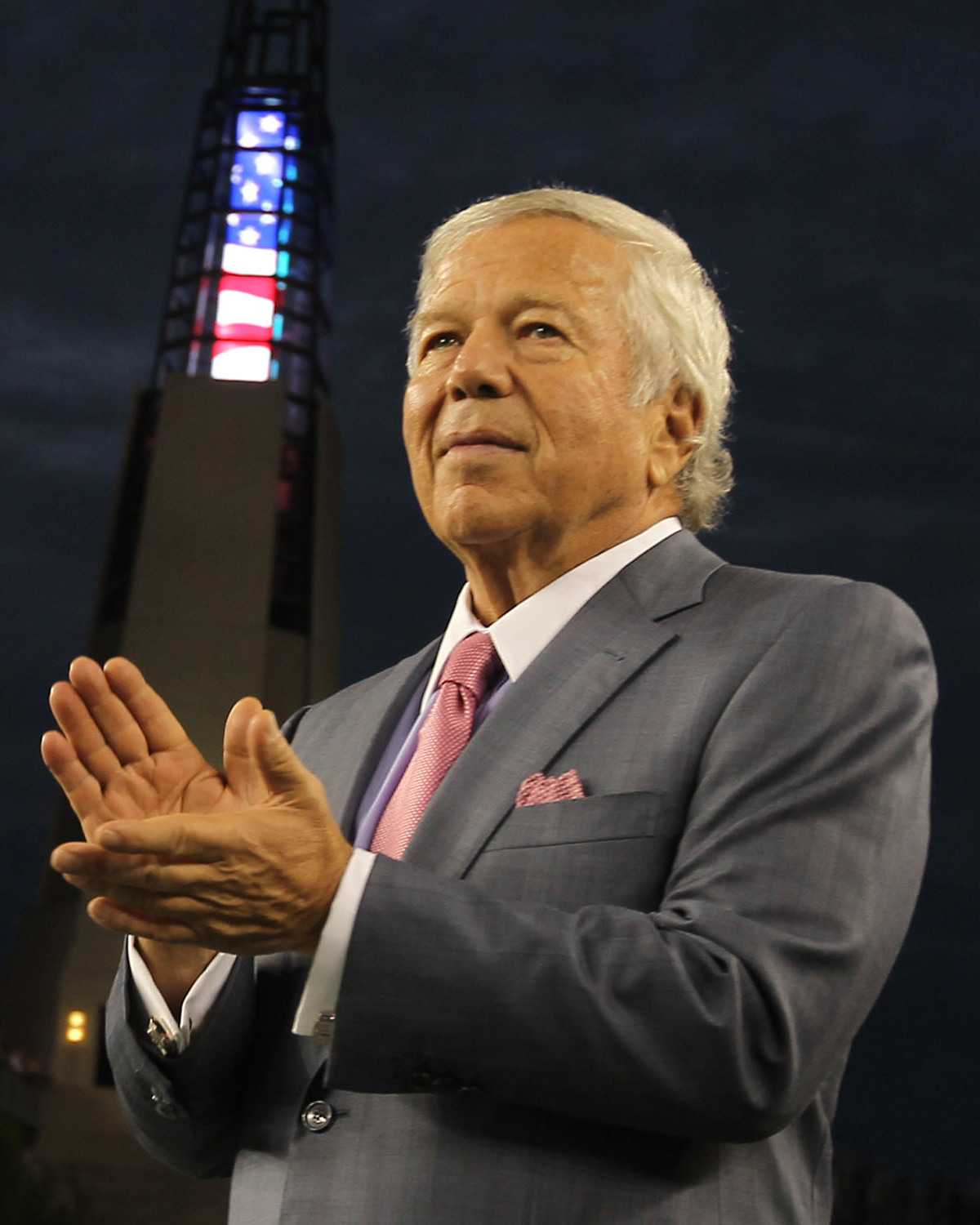
Robert Kraft

- Sheldon Adelson − chief executive officer of Las Vegas Sands Corp.
- Benjamin Bates IV − entrepreneur, namesake of Bates College
- Michael Bloomberg − founder of Bloomberg L.P. and 108th mayor of New York City (raised in Medford, Massachusetts)
- Amar Bose − inventor
- Horace Bowker (1877–1954) − farm economist and businessman
- Edward Goodwin Burnham − industrialist, Connecticut state senator
- Safra A. Catz − president of Oracle Corporation
- John S. Chen − chief executive officer of BlackBerry Ltd.
- Al Davis − former owner of the Oakland Raiders (deceased 2011)
- Elias Hasket Derby − reportedly America's first millionaire
- James Dole − "Pineapple King", founder of Dole Food Company
- Dan Duquette − general manager of the Baltimore Orioles
- Thomas C. Durant − vice president of the Union Pacific Railroad (1862−1870)
- William C. Durant − founder of General Motors and Chevrolet
- John Wesley Emerson − founder of the Emerson Electric Company
- Theo Epstein − general manager of the Chicago Cubs; previously with Boston Red Sox
- Aaron Feuerstein − inventor
- Dave Gettleman − general manager of the Carolina Panthers
- Crawford Greenewalt − president of DuPont (1948–1962)
- Reed Hastings − chief executive officer of Netflix
- Irwin M. Jacobs − co-founder and former chairman of Qualcomm
- Howard Deering Johnson − founder of the Howard Johnson's chain
- Leo Kahn − co-founder of Staples Inc.
- Joseph P. Kennedy Sr. − businessman, investor, U.S. ambassador to United Kingdom
- Robert Kraft − owner of the New England Patriots
- Jesse Livermore – stock trader
- Jeffrey Lurie − owner of the Philadelphia Eagles
- Eunice Kennedy Shriver – founder of the Special Olympics; sister of President John F. Kennedy
- George Swinnerton Parker − founder of Parker Brothers games
- Dave Portnoy – founder of Barstool Sports
- Sumner Redstone − entertainment mogul
- Henry Huttleston Rogers − industrialist
- James Harris Simons − mathematician, billionaire hedge fund manager
- Jes Staley − chief executive officer of Barclays
- Kevin Systrom – co-founder and CEO of Instagram
- Jack Welch − chief executive officer of General Electric (1981–2001)
- Oliver Winchester − founder of the Winchester Repeating Arms Company
- Robert Wolf − chairman and CEO of UBS's Group Americas division

== Civil rights leaders and political activists ==
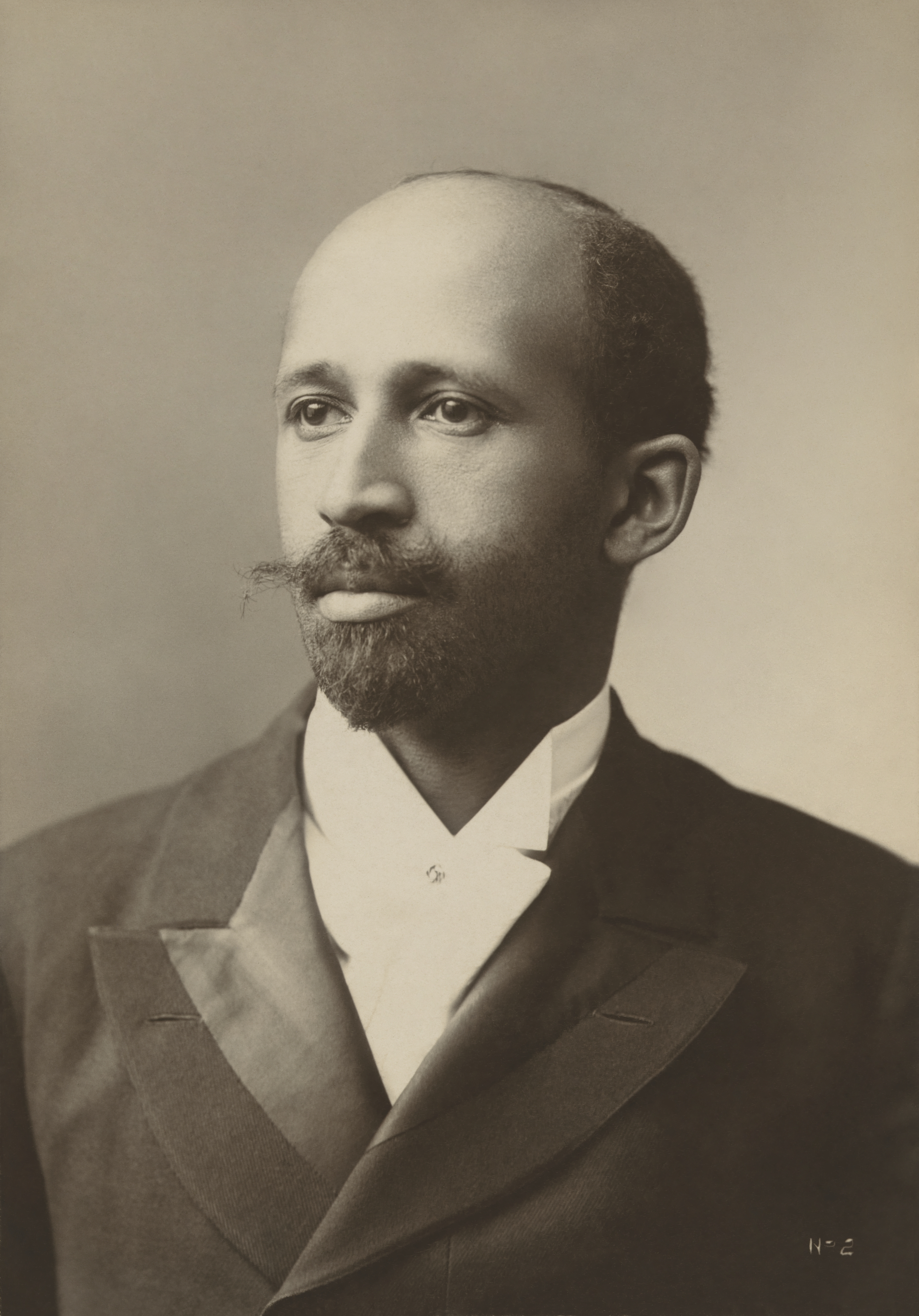
W.E.B. Du Bois

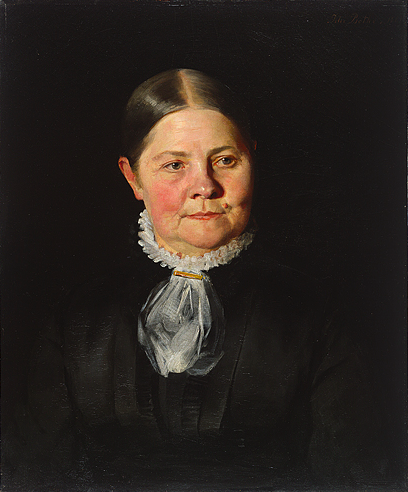
Lucy Stone

- Susan B. Anthony − social reformist, suffragist
- Roger Nash Baldwin − co-founder of American Civil Liberties Union
- David Bossie − political activist, president of Citizens United
- Jahaira DeAlto − community advocate and anti-domestic violence activist
- Frederick Douglass − abolitionist, social reformist; lived in New Bedford and Lynn
- W. E. B. Du Bois − civil rights activist, co-founder of the NAACP
- Aubri Esters − activist who fought to expand rights and treatment accessibility for people who use drugs
- Abby Kelley Foster − suffragist and abolitionist
- Elizabeth Fox-Genovese − feminist historian and writer
- Elizabeth Freeman − slave in Sheffield; sued for and won freedom on basis of state constitution, 1781
- Margaret Fuller − journalist and suffragist
- William Lloyd Garrison − abolitionist, journalist, and social reformist
- Prince Hall − abolitionist and leader in the free black community in Boston
- Abbie Hoffman − political activist, co-founder of the "Yippies"
- Horace Mann − U.S. congressman, educationist, and abolitionist
- Nathaniel Raymond − human rights investigator and anti-torture advocate
- Lucy Stone − suffragist and abolitionist
- Quock Walker − slave in Worcester County; won freedom on basis of state constitution, 1781
- Malcolm X − civil rights activist; spent adolescence in Roxbury

== Crime ==
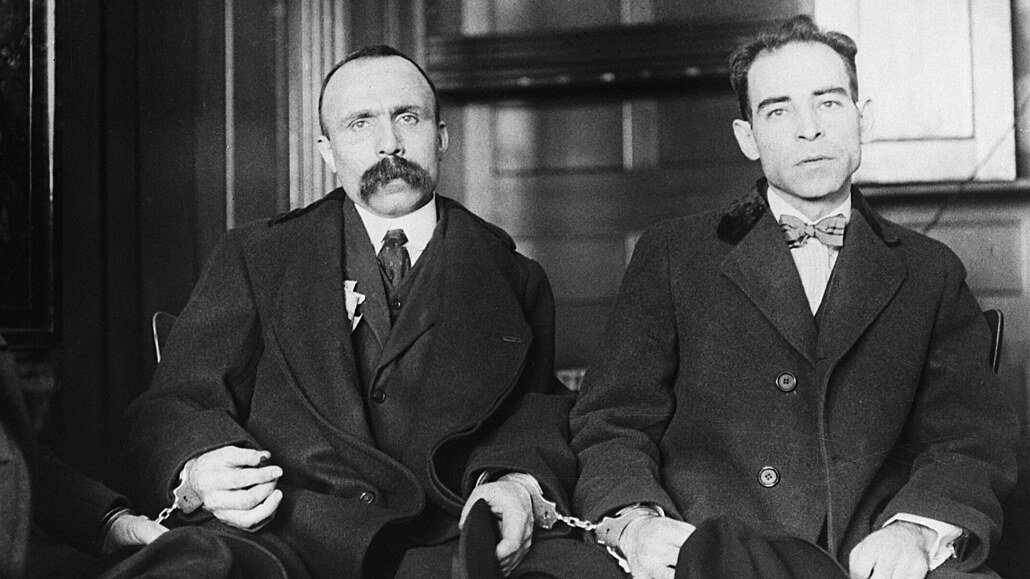
Bartolomeo Vanzetti (left) and Nicola Sacco (right)

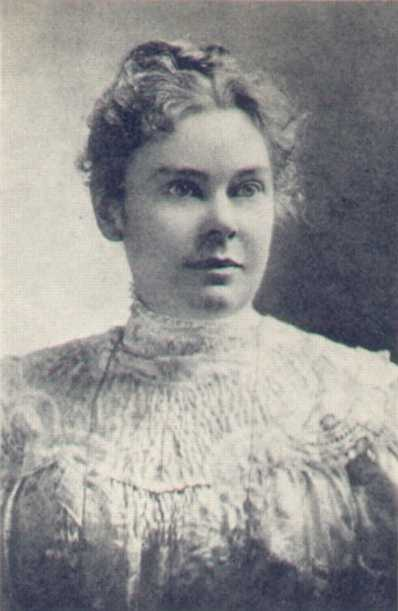
Lizzie Borden

- Nathaniel Bar-Jonah − convicted child molester, suspected serial killer and cannibal
- Paul Bilzerian (born 1950) − financier convicted of securities fraud
- Elizabeth Borden − accused murderer, acquitted
- James J. "Whitey" Bulger − mobster, leader of Winter Hill Gang
- Albert DeSalvo "Boston Strangler" − criminal
- Thomas DeSimone − gangster
- "Anthony the Animal" Fiato − mobster
- Stephen "The Rifleman" Flemmi − gangster
- Jimmy Flynn − mobster, actor
- David Gilbert − radical activist
- George "Boston George" Jung − drug trafficker, smuggler
- Bernard "Bernie" McLaughlin − gangster
- Edward "Punchy" McLaughlin − gangster
- James "Buddy" McLean − mobster
- James "Spike" O'Toole − mobster
- Karen Read – accused murderer, acquitted
- Jacob D. Robida − neo-Nazi, criminal
- "Handsome Johnny" Roselli − mobster for the Chicago Outfit
- Frank Salemme − mobster, hitman
- Elizabeth Short − victim in the unsolved “Black Dahlia” case
- Nicola Sacco and Bartolomeo Vanzetti – Italian immigrants who were defendants in a controversial murder trial for an armed robbery of a shoe company in Braintree, Massachusetts
- Frank Wallace − gangster
- Howie Winter − mobster

== Entertainment ==
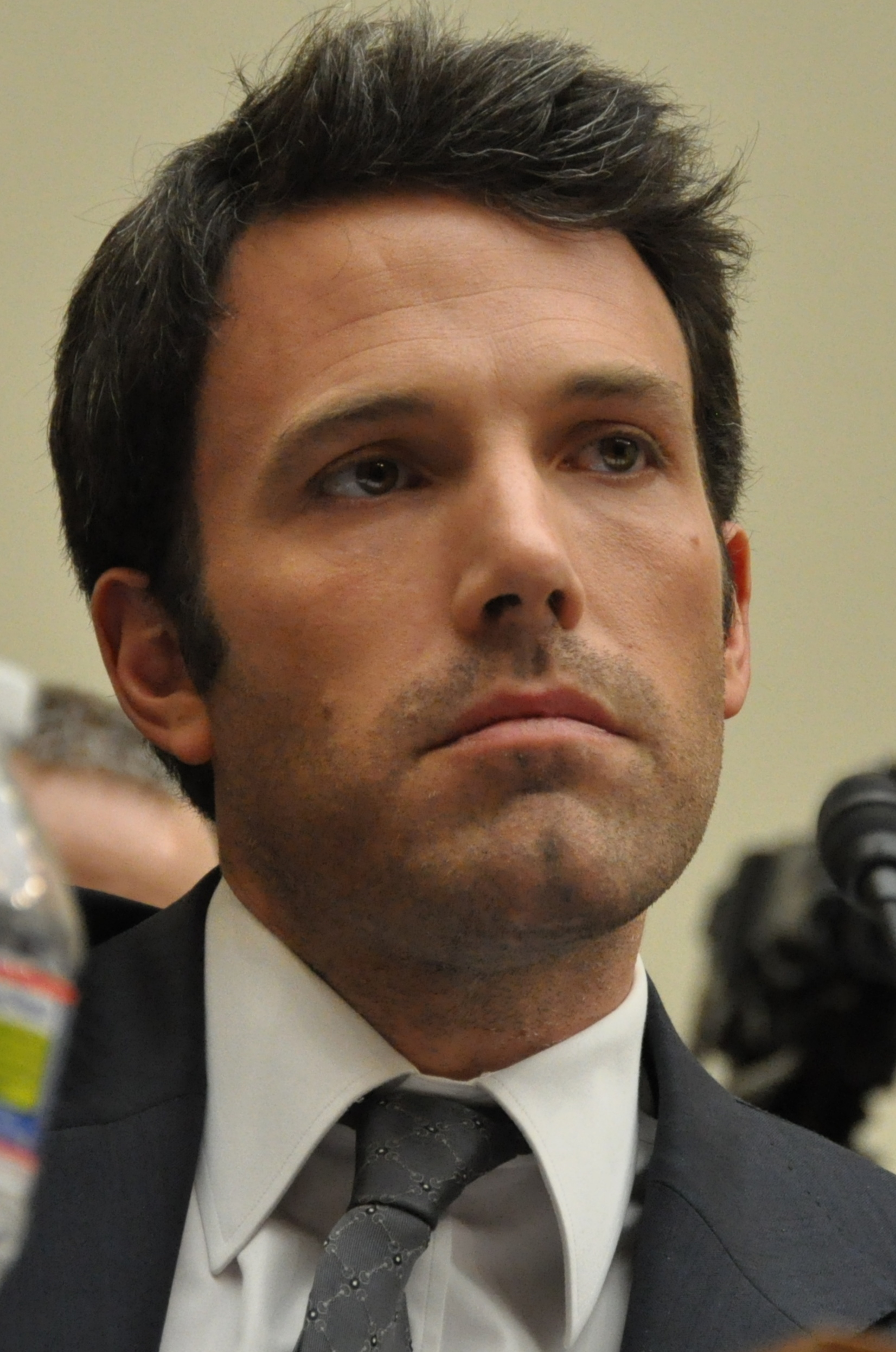
Ben Affleck

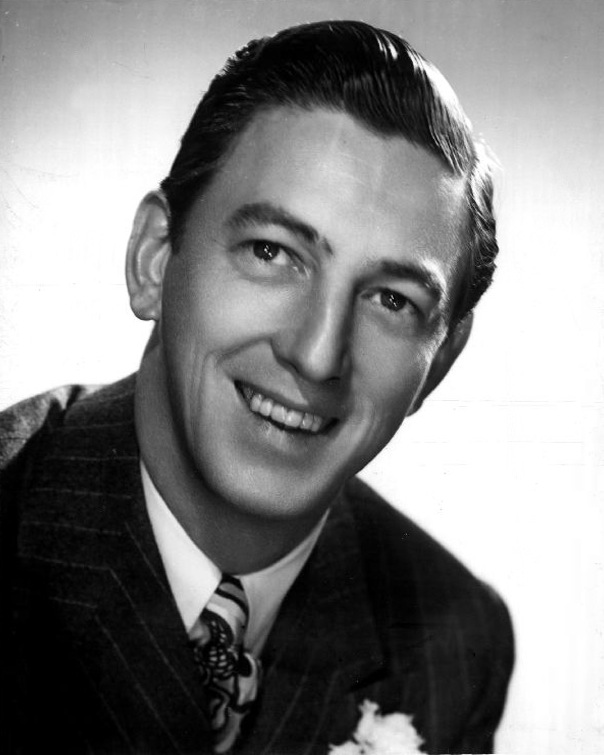
Ray Bolger

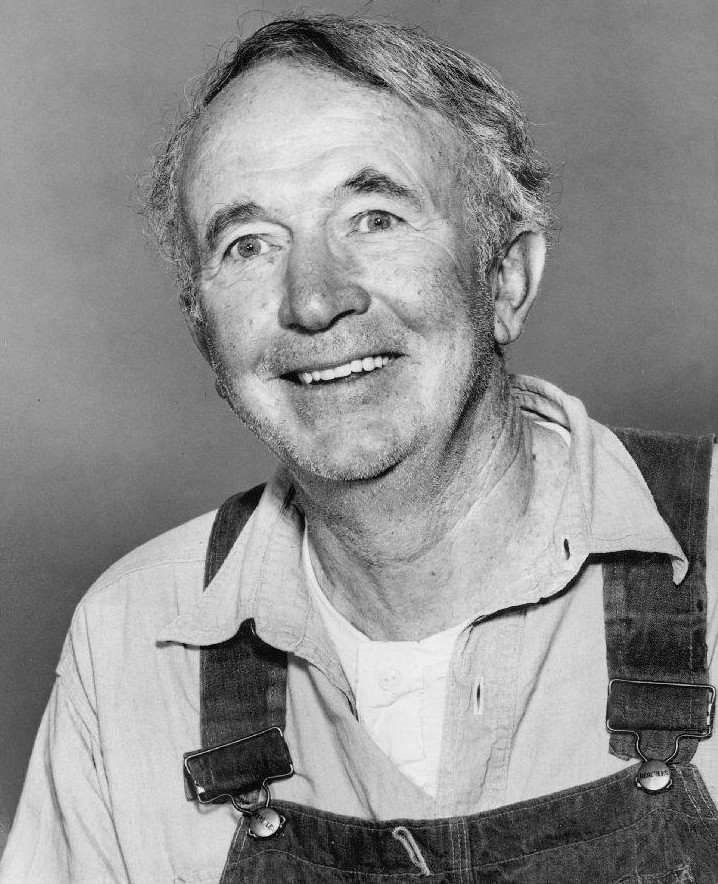
Walter Brennan

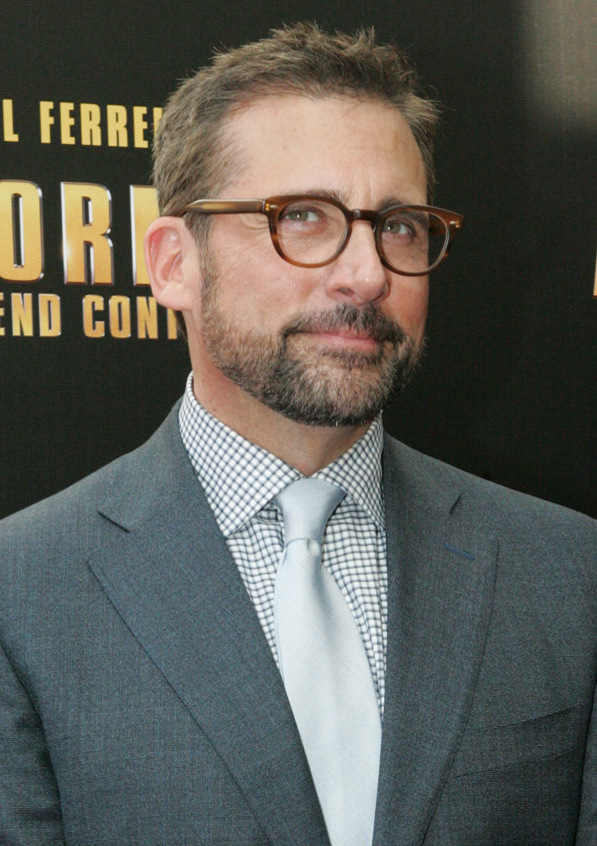
Steve Carell

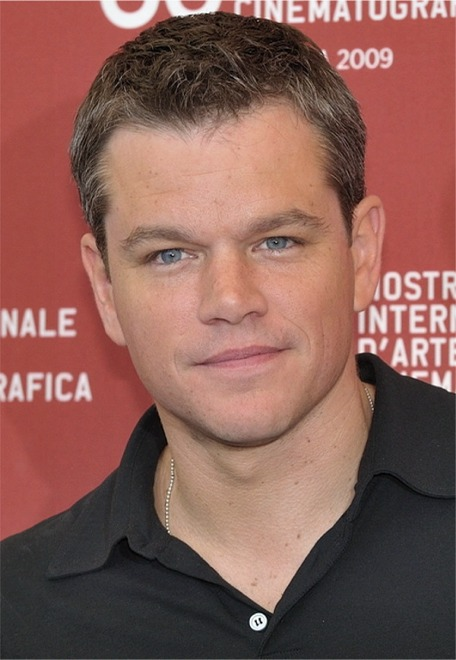
Matt Damon

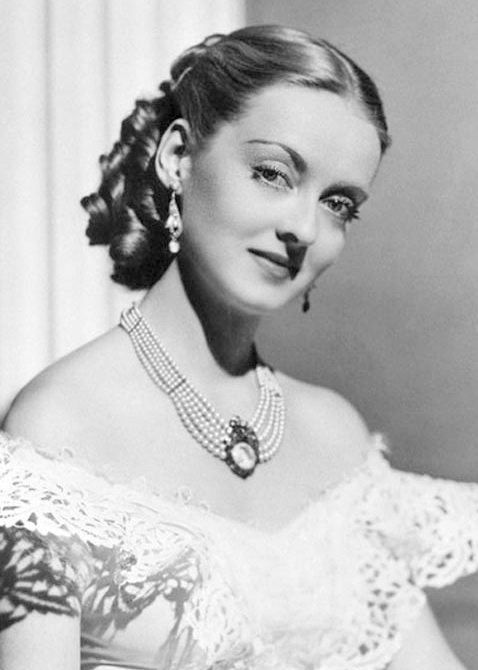
Bette Davis

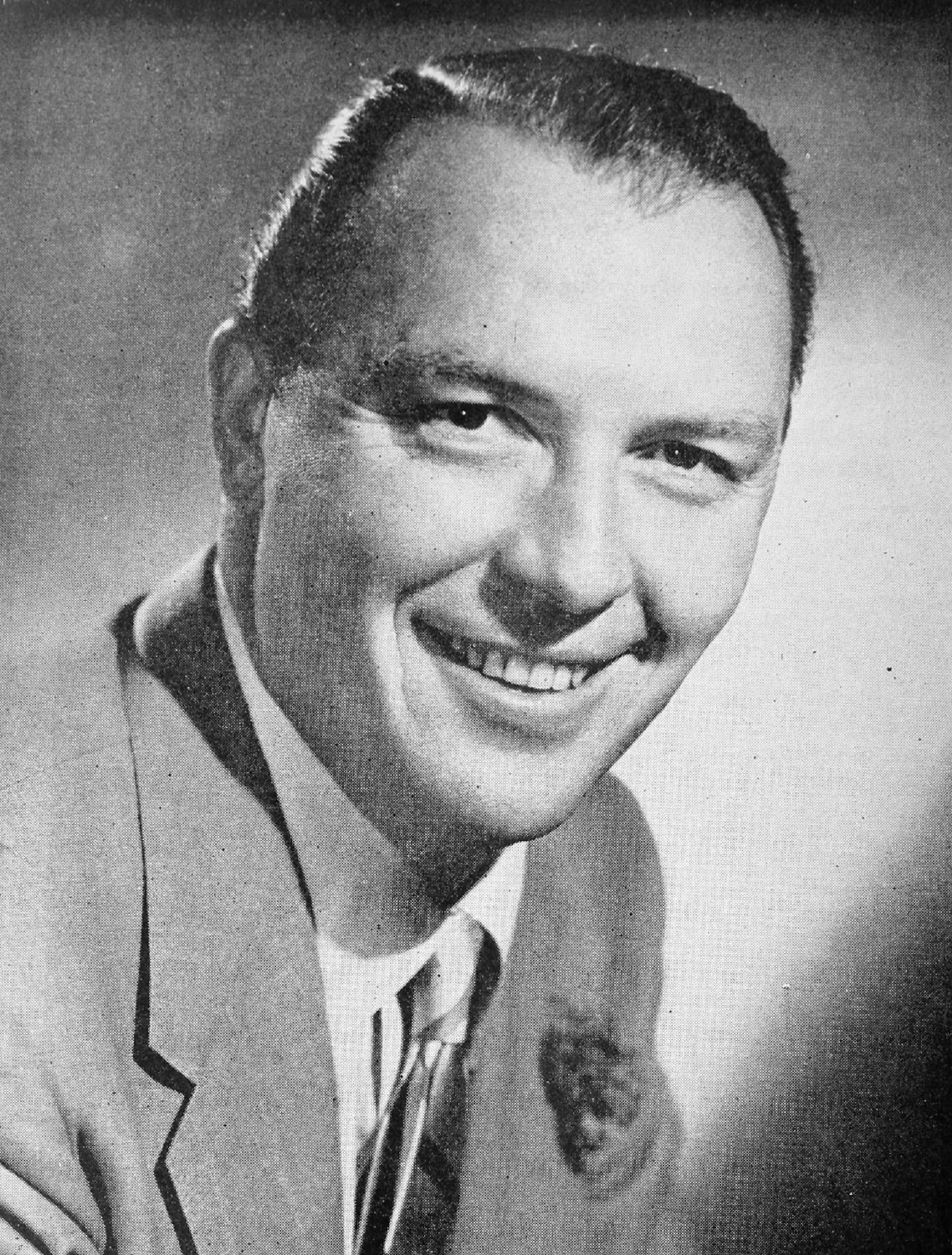
Ed Herlihy

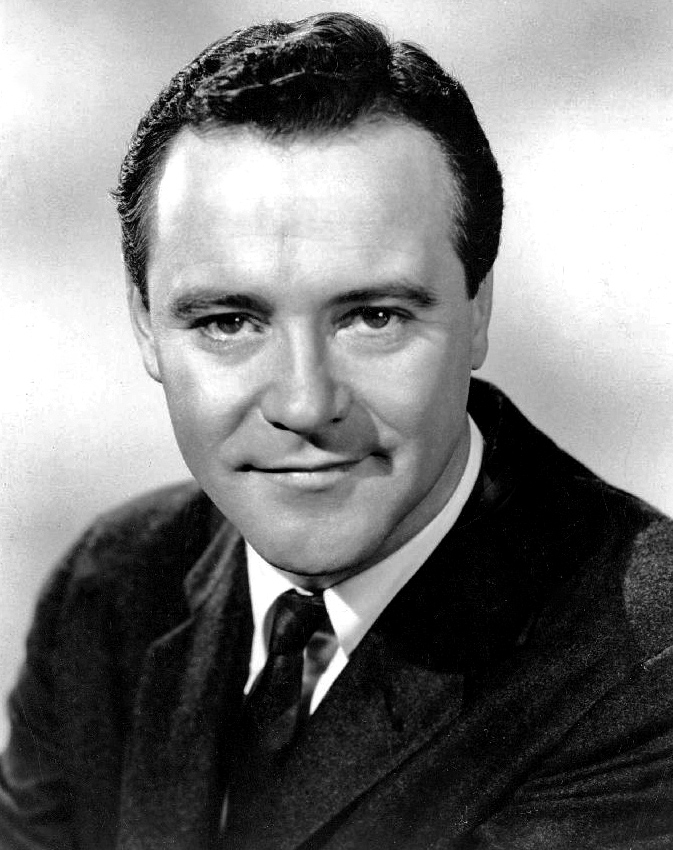
Jack Lemmon

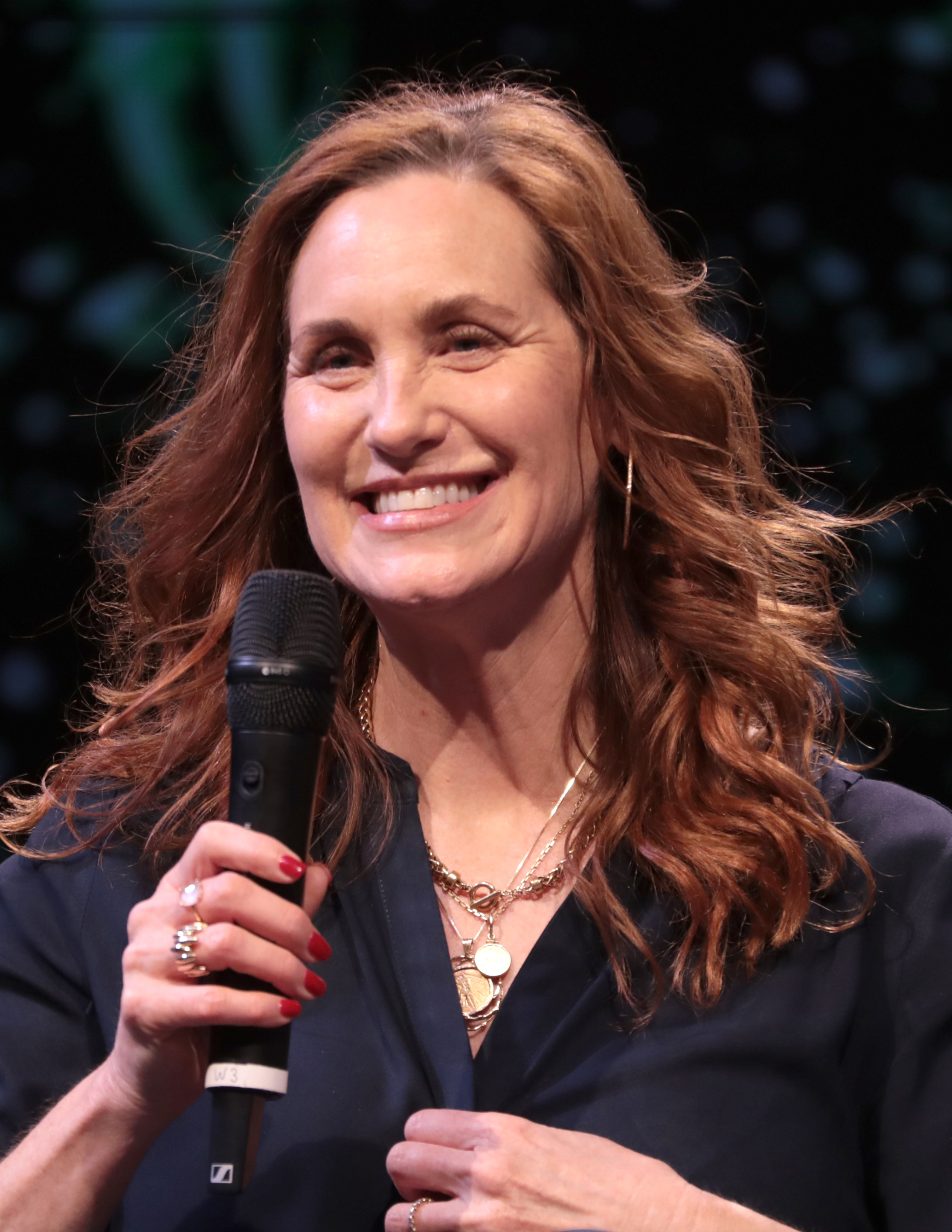
Judith Hoag

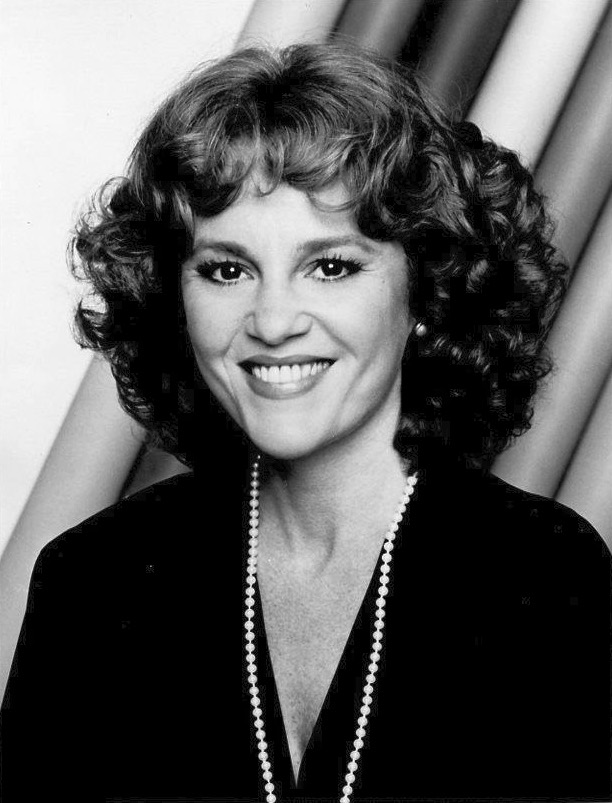
Madeline Kahn

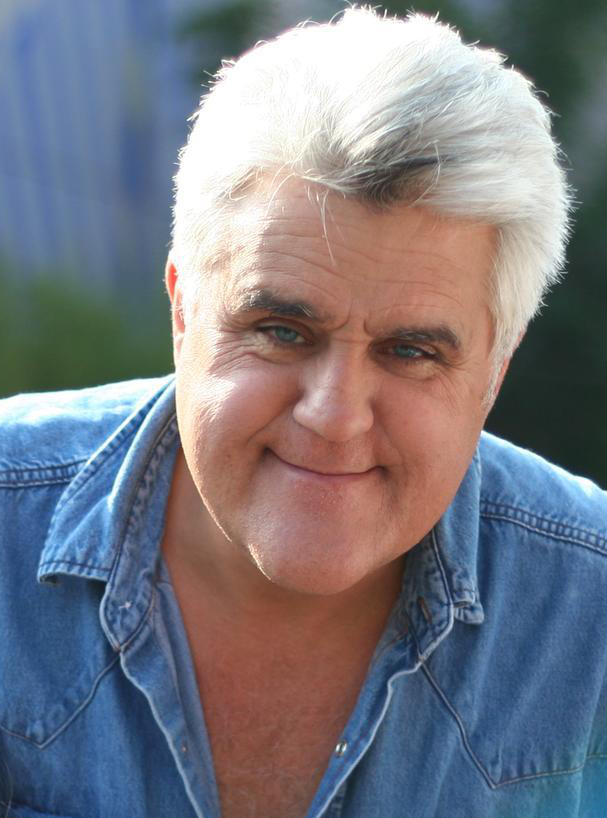
Jay Leno

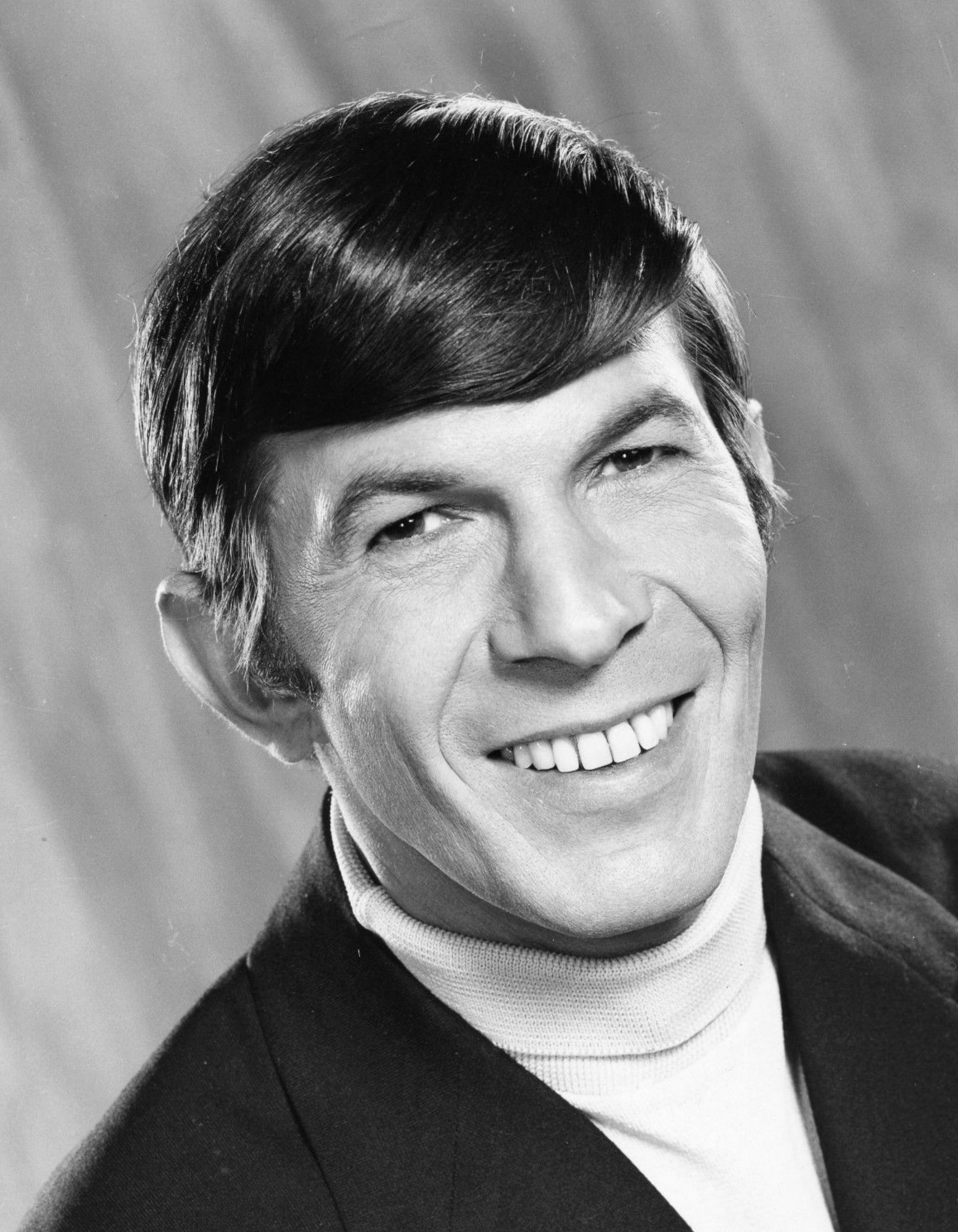
Leonard Nimoy

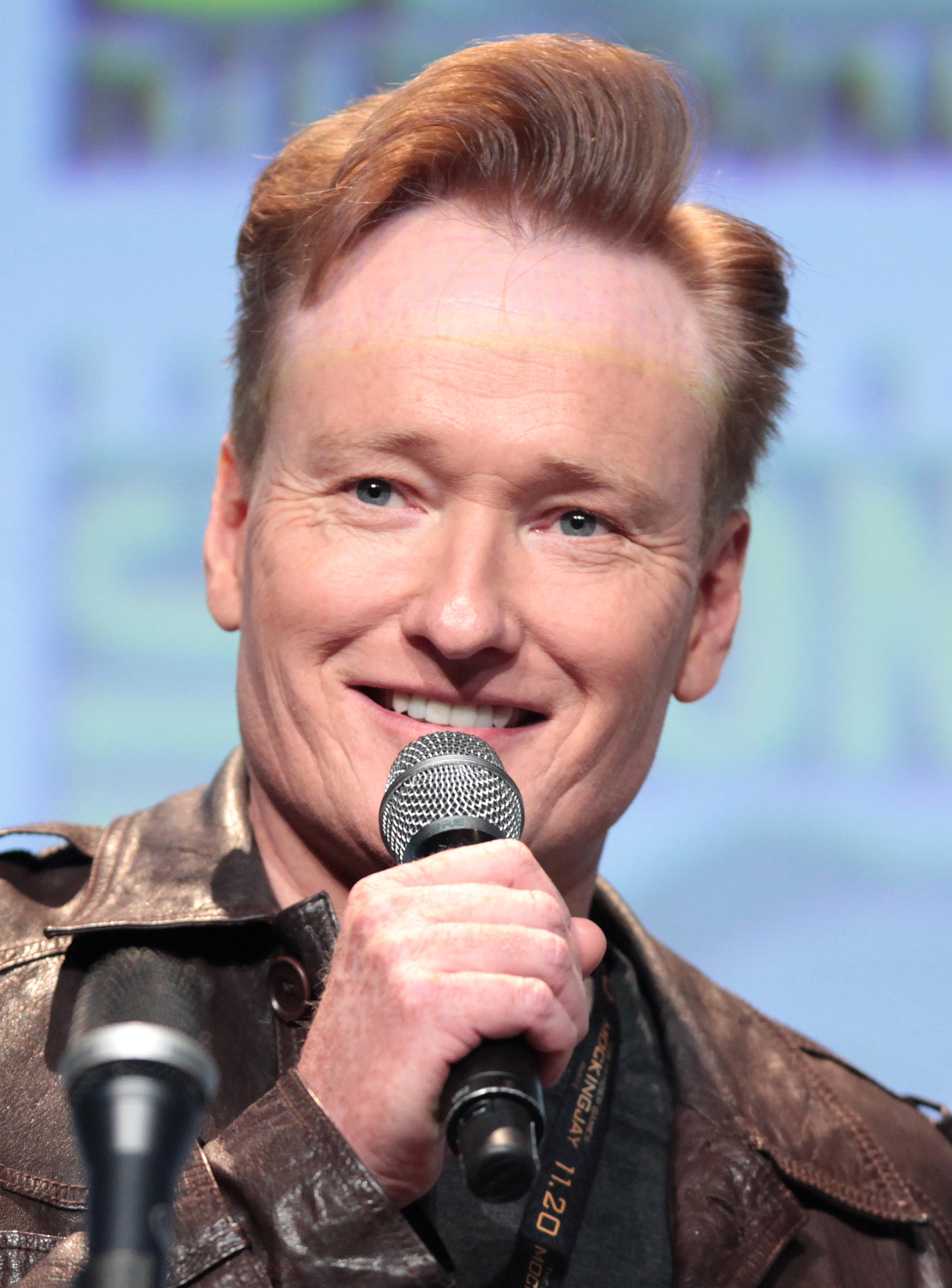
Conan O'Brien

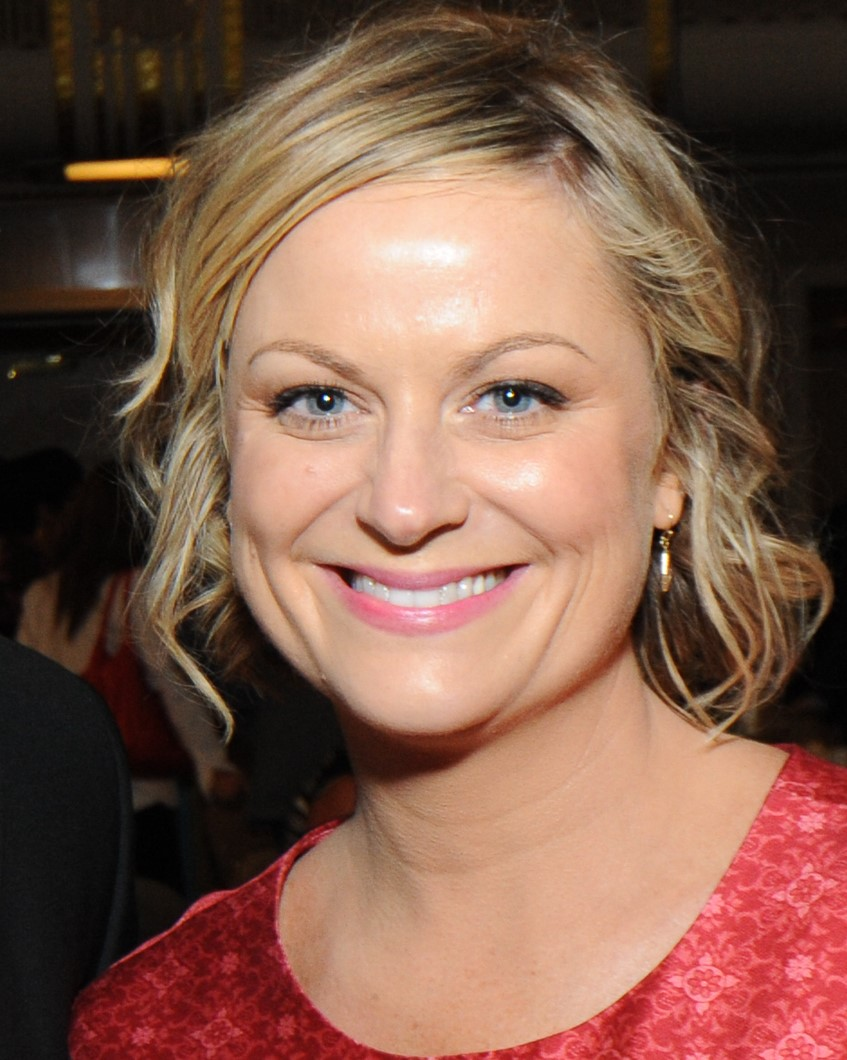
Amy Poehler

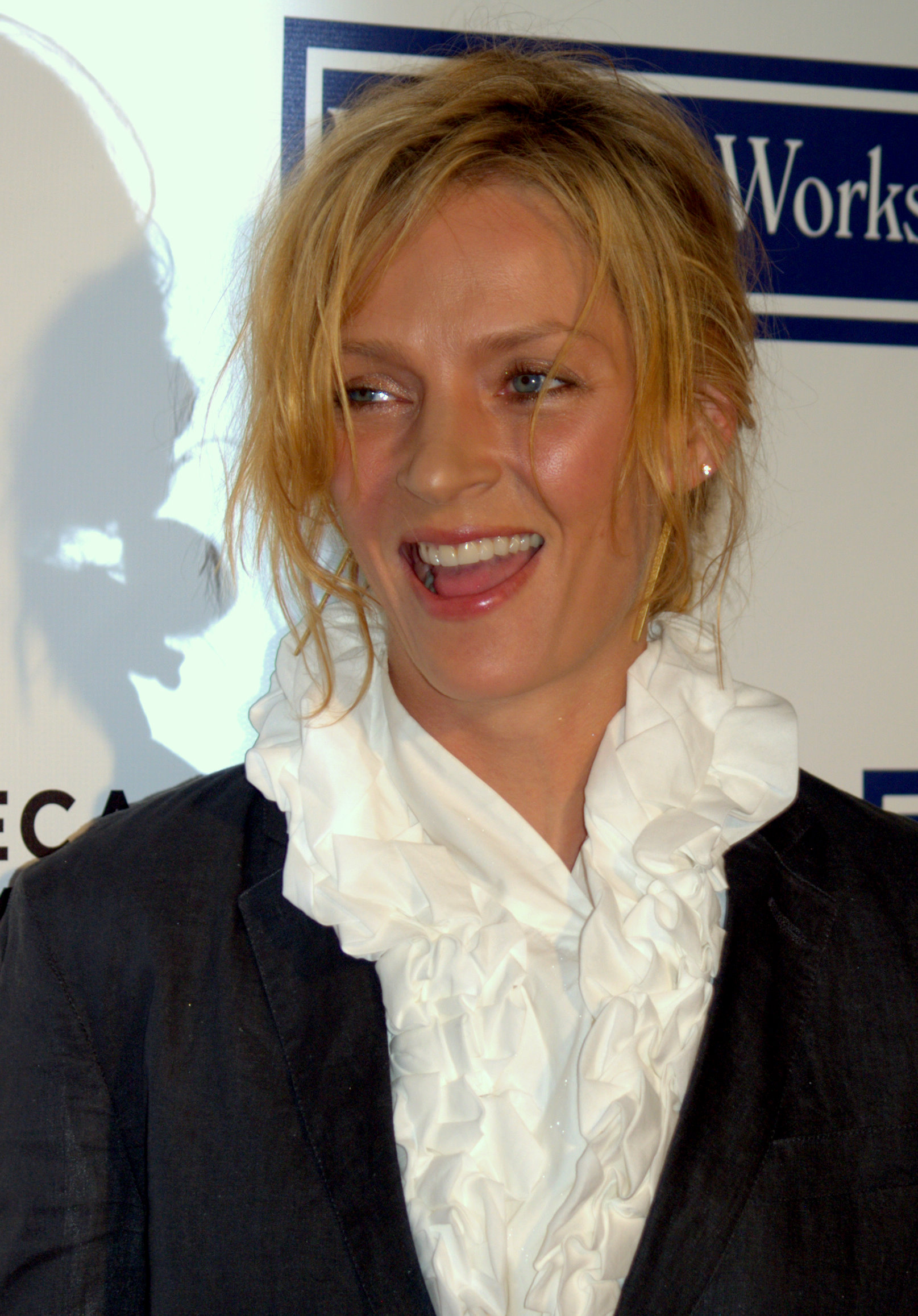
Uma Thurman

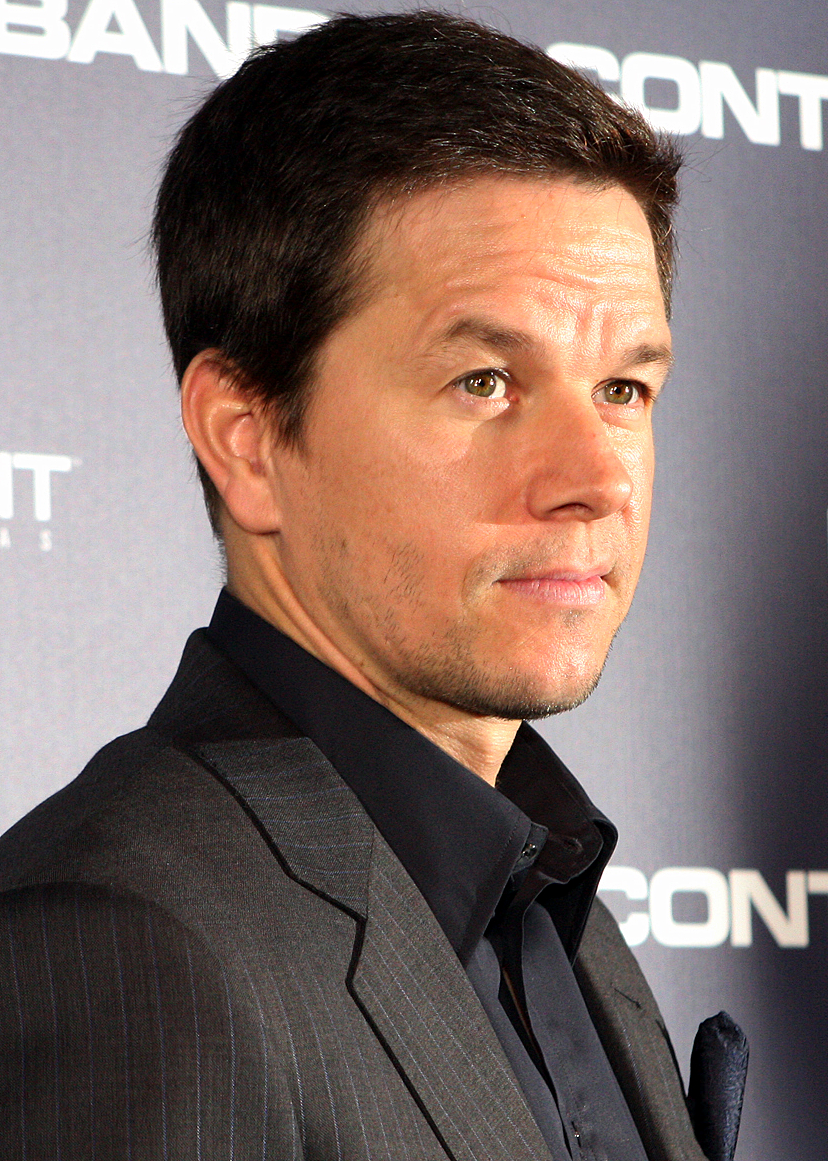
Mark Wahlberg

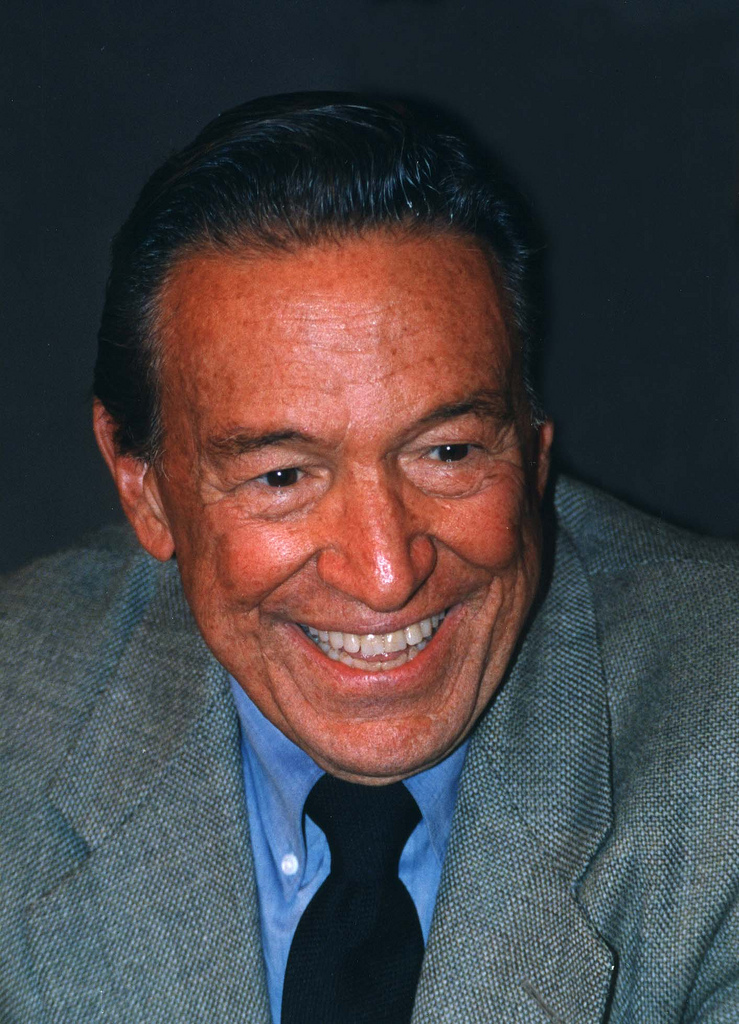
Mike Wallace

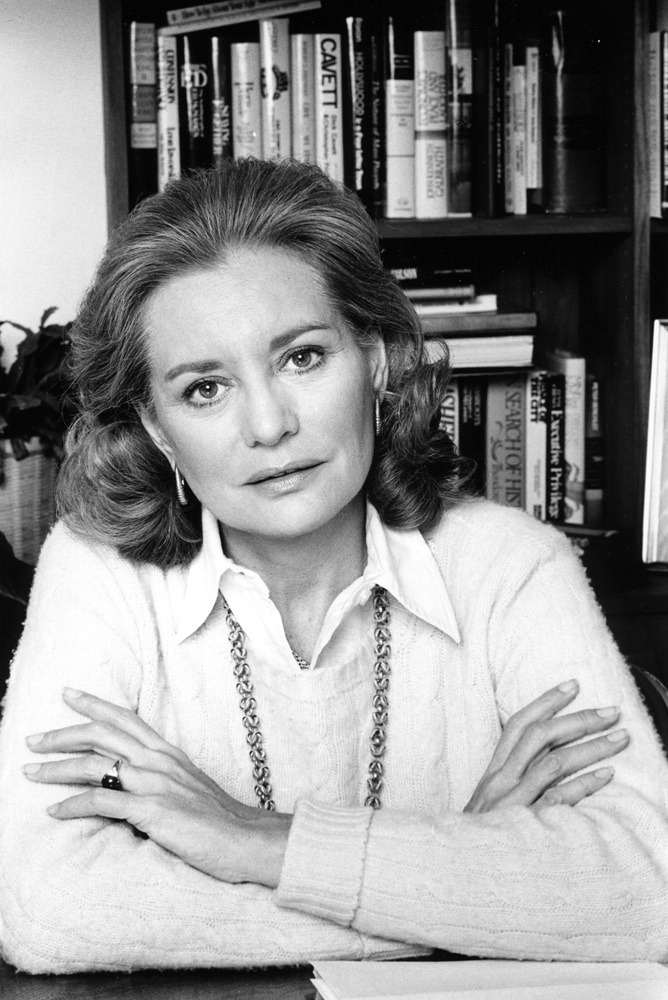
Barbara Walters

=== Comedians ===
- Edwin Adams – comedian, stage actor
- Orny Adams – comedian, actor, Teen Wolf
- Fred Allen – radio comedian
- Anthony Barbieri – comedy writer and performer, Jimmy Kimmel Live!
- Mike Birbiglia – comedian
- Andrew Bowen – comedian, MADtv
- Bo Burnham – comedian
- Bill Burr – comedian, actor
- Louis C.K. – comedian, actor, director, Louie
- Bryan Callen – comedian, actor
- Mario Cantone – comedian
- Steve Carell – comedian, actor, The Office
- Robert Carlock – producer, writer, 30 Rock
- Jessica Chaffin – comedian and actor, The Heat
- Lenny Clarke – comedian and actor, Rescue Me
- Jerry Colonna – comedian, singer
- Dane Cook – comedian and actor; Retaliation, Harmful If Swallowed (Arlington)
- Nate Corddry – comedian, actor, The Daily Show
- Rob Corddry – comedian, actor, The Daily Show with Jon Stewart
- Rob Delaney – comedian, writer
- Jamie Denbo – comedian, actress, Terriers
- Nick DiPaolo – comedian
- Rachel Dratch – comedian, Saturday Night Live
- Ayo Edebiri – comedian, actress
- John Ennis – comedian, actor, Mr. Show with Bob and David
- Spike Feresten – comedy writer, television personality
- Christian Finnegan – comedian, actor, Are We There Yet?
- Chris Fleming – comedian
- Gary Gulman – comedian
- Pete Holmes – comedian, comedy writer, television personality, voice-over actor
- Jerma985 − online personality (Boston)
- Penn Jillette – comedian, illusionist, juggler, writer
- Mindy Kaling – comedian, actress The Office US, The Mindy Project
- Robert Kelly – comedian, actor, NYC 22
- Jen Kirkman – comedian, actress, writer, SuperNews!
- John Krasinski – comedian, actor The Office US
- Denis Leary – comedian and actor
- Jay Leno – comedian and talk show host
- Jason Mantzoukas – comedian and writer, The League
- Matt Mira – comedian, writer, and podcaster
- Eugene Mirman – comedian and writer, Bob's Burgers
- B. J. Novak – comedian, actor, head writer of The Office US
- Conan O'Brien – comedian and talk show host (Cambridge)
- Patrice O'Neal – comedian, writer
- John Pinette – comedian, actor
- Amy Poehler – comedian, actress, Parks and Recreation
- Paula Poundstone – comedian
- Joe Rogan – comedian, actor, huge hog
- Faith Salie – comedian, actress, radio host, Significant Others
- Frankie Saluto – circus performer, professional clown
- Lew Schneider – comedian, actor, writer, Everybody Loves Raymond
- Matt Selman – writer, producer, The Simpsons
- Tom Shillue – comedian, host of Red Eye
- Jenny Slate – comedian, actress, Saturday Night Live
- Doug Stanhope – comedian
- Steve Sweeney – comedian and actor
- Jimmy Tingle – comedian and actor
- Nancy Walls – comedian, actress
- Steven Wright – comedian, actor (Burlington)
- Katya Zamolodchikova − drag queen, actor, author, recording artist, podcaster, and comedian (Marlborough, Boston)

=== Television and film ===
A–H

- Uzo Aduba – actress
- Ben Affleck – Oscar-winning screenwriter, director and actor; Good Will Hunting, Argo (Berkeley, California)
- Casey Affleck – actor (Falmouth), Oscar-winning actor, Manchester by the Sea
- Jack Albertson – Oscar-winning actor
- Jane Alexander – Emmy and Tony Award-winning actress
- Kristian Alfonso – actress
- Christopher Allport – actor
- Shawn Andrews – actor
- John Ashton – actor
- Elizabeth Banks – actress
- Susan Batson – actress, producer
- Michael Beach – actor
- Tobin Bell – actor
- Paul Benedict – actor
- H. Jon Benjamin – voice actor; Bob's Burgers, Archer (Worcester)
- Traci Bingham – actress, model
- Connie Britton – actress
- Vail Bloom – actress
- Verna Bloom – actress
- Eric Bogosian – actor, playwright; Law & Order: Criminal Intent, Talk Radio (Woburn)
- Ray Bolger – actor
- Walter Brennan – Academy Award-winning actor
- Paget Brewster – actress
- Clarence Brown – director
- Phil Brown – actor
- Wally Brown – actor
- Jere Burns – actor
- Steve Carell – actor, The Office, The 40-Year-Old Virgin (Acton)
- Richard Carle – actor
- Corey Carrier – actor
- Max Casella – actor
- Peggy Cass – actress, television personality
- John Cazale – actor
- John Cena – actor and WWE Champion (West Newbury)
- Kevin Chapman – actor
- Michael Chiklis – actor
- Etan Cohen – screenwriter
- Misha Collins – actor
- Jennifer Coolidge – actress
- Nate Corddry – actor, The Daily Show with Jon Stewart, Studio 60 (Weymouth)
- Rob Corddry – The Daily Show with Jon Stewart (Weymouth)
- Marcia Cross – Desperate Housewives (Marlborough)
- Monique Gabriela Curnen – actress
- Jane Curtin – actress
- Matt Damon – Academy Award-winning screenwriter and actor; Good Will Hunting, The Bourne Identity, The Departed (Cambridge)
- Bette Davis – actress
- Geena Davis – Academy Award-winning actress; Thelma and Louise (Wareham)
- Billy De Wolfe – actor, comedian, singer, voice actor Frosty the Snowman
- Ken Doane – wrestler (Worcester)
- Ed Donovan – Monster, Acts of Mercy (South Boston)
- Jeffrey Donovan – actor; Burn Notice (Amesbury)
- Illeana Douglas – actress
- Rachel Dratch – actress, Saturday Night Live (Lexington)
- Anne Dudek – actress
- Olympia Dukakis – Academy Award-winning actress
- Eliza Dushku – actress
- Richard Dysart – actor
- Ayo Edebiri – comedian, actress
- Lisa Edelstein – actress
- Ben Edlund – producer, writer
- Charles H. Eglee – Emmy Award-winning producer and writer
- Lee Eisenberg – producer, writer
- John Enos III – actor
- Kathryn Erbe – actress
- Chris Evans – actor
- Scott Evans – actor
- Charles Farrell – actor
- Guy Ferland – film and television director
- Betty Field – actress
- Alison Folland – actress
- Ben Foster – actor
- Arlene Francis – actress
- Samuel Fuller – director, screenwriter
- Sabina Gadecki – model, actress
- Christos Gage – screenwriter
- Pamela Gidley – actress
- Paul Michael Glaser – actor, director
- Nick Gomez – director
- Ruth Gordon – actress
- Joey Graceffa – YouTube personality, actor
- Sprague Grayden – actress
- Ari Graynor – actress
- Adam Green – actor, director, screenwriter
- Lynnie Greene – actress, writer, producer
- Clark Gregg – actor, screenwriter
- Scott Grimes – actor
- Paul Guilfoyle – actor
- Jack Haley – actor
- Anthony Michael Hall – actor
- Pooch Hall – actor
- Neil Hamilton – actor
- Jane Hamsher – film producer
- Van Hansis – actor
- G Hannelius – actress
- Jay Harrington – actor
- Jesse Heiman – actor
- John Michael Higgins – actor
- Nichole Hiltz – actress
- Marin Hinkle – actress
- Judith Hoag – actress
- John Hodgman – The Daily Show, "I'm a PC" in Get a Mac (Brookline)
- Hal Holbrook – actor

I–P

- Marie Jansen – musical actress
- Ann Jillian – actress
- Amy Jo Johnson – actress
- Chris J. Johnson – actor
- JoJo – actress, singer
- Julia Jones – actress
- Jennifer Jostyn – actress
- Madeline Kahn – actress, singer
- Mindy Kaling – actress, Inside Out, The Mindy Project (Cambridge)
- Ben Karlin – comedian, The Daily Show with Jon Stewart, The Colbert Report (Needham)
- Joe Keery – actor, Stranger Things
- David E. Kelley – Emmy Award-winning writer and producer
- Jean Louisa Kelly – actress
- Arthur Kennedy – actor
- The Klimaszewski Twins – models, actresses
- John Krasinski – actor, The Office (Newton)
- Ben Kurland – The Artist (Newton)
- Denis Leary – actor, Rescue Me, A Bug's Life, Ice Age (Worcester)
- Matt LeBlanc – actor, Friends (Newton)
- Rex Lee – actor
- Jack Lemmon – Academy Award-winning actor
- Jay Leno – comedian and host, The Tonight Show (Andover)
- Joseph E. Levine – producer
- Richard Libertini – actor
- Laura Linney – actress (Northfield Mount Hermon School)
- Alexander Mackendrick – director
- Rob Mariano – Survivor contestant
- Nora Marlowe – actor
- Erica McDermott – actress
- Neal McDonough – actor
- Richard McGonagle – actor
- Melinda McGraw – actress
- Ed McMahon – television personality, The Tonight Show Starring Johnny Carson, Star Search (Lowell)
- Terrence E. McNally – actor
- Julie McNiven – actress
- Maria Menounos – Entertainment Tonight, Extra (Medford)
- Jan Miner – actress
- Eugene Mirman – voice actor
- William Monahan – screenwriter
- Agnes Moorehead – Emmy Award-winning actress
- David Morse – actor
- Robert Morse – actor, singer
- Ebon Moss-Bachrach – actor
- Bridget Moynahan – actress
- Peter Murnik – actor
- Donna Murphy – actress
- Alexandra Neil – actress
- Barry Newman – actor
- Julianne Nicholson – actress
- Leonard Nimoy – actor, Star Trek, IMAX voiceover (Boston)
- Alessandro Nivola – actor
- Lance Norris – actor, The Judge (Cohasset)
- Edward Norton – actor, American History X, The Incredible Hulk (Boston)
- B. J. Novak – actor, The Office (Newton)
- Conan O'Brien – television personality, Late Night with Conan O'Brien (Brookline)
- Tricia O'Kelley – actress
- Benjamin John Parrillo – actor
- Estelle Parsons – Academy Award-winning actress
- Adrian Pasdar – actor
- Elizabeth Perkins – actress
- John Bennett Perry – actor
- Matthew Perry – actor
- Rebecca Pidgeon – actress
- Joseph Pilato – actor
- Maryann Plunkett – actress
- Amy Poehler – actress, Saturday Night Live, Inside Out (Burlington)
- Ellen Pompeo – Old School, Grey's Anatomy (Everett)
- Robert Preston – actor

Q–Z

- Alan Rachins – actor
- Natalie Ramsey – actress
- Kim Raver – actress (Northfield Mount Hermon School)
- Sam Reich – comedian, producer
- Joseph D. Reitman – actor
- James Remar – actor
- Patrick Renna – actor
- Robert Richardson – Academy Award-winning cinematographer
- Alex Rocco – actor
- Eli Roth – director, screenwriter, actor; Hostel (Newton)
- Harold Russell – Academy Award-winning actor
- Kurt Russell – actor, Escape from New York (Springfield)
- Damien Sandow – born Aaron Haddad, professional wrestler
- Taylor Schilling – actress
- Fred J. Scollay – actor
- Tom Everett Scott – actor
- Jere Shea – actor
- John Slattery – actor
- Hillary B. Smith – actress
- Paul L. Smith – actor
- Talisa Soto – actress
- James Spader – Emmy Award-winning actor; The Blacklist, Boston Legal (Boston)
- Caroll Spinney – puppeteer of Big Bird and Oscar the Grouch on Sesame Street
- Andrew Stanton – director, screenwriter, producer
- David Starzyk – actor
- Skipp Sudduth – actor
- Erik Per Sullivan – actor
- Liam Kyle Sullivan – the "Kelly" Skits (Boston)
- Julie Taymor – director
- Casey Patrick Tebo – director
- Robin Thomas – actor
- Uma Thurman – actress, Pulp Fiction, Kill Bill (Amherst)
- T. J. Thyne – actor
- Maura Tierney – actress
- Nancy Travis – actress
- Jonathan Tucker – actor
- Paige Turco – actress
- Anne Twomey – actress
- Steven Tyler – actor, musician, TV personality (Lynn, Marshfield)
- Steven Van Zandt – actor
- Donnie Wahlberg – actor and musician
- Mark Wahlberg – actor, musician, producer; Entourage, The Departed, Ted (Dorchester)
- Nancy Walls – actress, Saturday Night Live, The Office (Cohasset)
- Barbara Walters – television journalist and personality (Boston)
- Sam Waterston – actor
- William A. Wellman – Academy Award-winning director
- Lyle R. Wheeler – Academy Award-winning art director (Woburn)
- Brian J. White – actor, dancer
- Kristen Wilson – actress
- Alicia Witt – actress (Worcester)
- Kenny Wormald – dancer, actor
- George Wyner – actor
- Greg Yaitanes – director
- Rob Zombie – director, screenwriter, The Devil's Rejects (Haverhill)

=== Radio ===
- Dean Barnett – occasional fill-in radio host for Hugh Hewitt
- Liane Hansen – senior host of NPR's Weekend Edition Sunday
- Ray and Tom Magliozzi – of Car Talk
- Leslie Marshall – radio talk host
- Henry Joseph Nasiff Jr. – former Howard Stern Show regular
- Ryen Russillo – sports radio host
- Paul Sullivan – radio talk host

=== Hosts, sportscasters, and television personalities ===
- Tom Bergeron – television personality and game show host
- Michelle Bonner – ESPN SportsCenter and ESPNEWS anchor
- Susie Castillo – MTV VJ and 2003 Miss USA
- Liz Claman – anchor for Fox Business Network's Countdown to the Closing Bell
- Bertha Coombs – general assignment reporter for CNBC
- S. E. Cupp – conservative pundit and Crossfire panelist
- Fred Cusick – play-by-play announcer for the Boston Bruins
- Arwa Damon – video correspondent for CNN International and CNN based in Iraq
- Damien Fahey – MTV VJ
- Josh Gates – explorer and host of Destination Truth on Syfy network
- Ed Herlihy – radio and television announcer
- John King – CNN chief national correspondent
- Steve Kornacki – political commentator on MSNBC and host of Up
- Wayne Larrivee – play-by-play announcer for the Green Bay Packers; previously for the Chicago Bears
- Josh Lewin – play-by-play announcer for the Texas Rangers
- Sean McDonough – sports announcer for ESPN
- Maria Menounos – television presenter for Entertainment Tonight and Access Hollywood
- Katie Nolan – Emmy-winning television host for Fox Sports 1
- Dave O'Brien – ESPN sportscaster
- Lawrence O'Donnell – political commentator on MSNBC and host of The Last Word
- Don Orsillo – play-by-play announcer for the San Diego Padres
- Gil Santos – WBZ, voice of the New England Patriots
- John Sencio – host of Cash in the Attic for HGTV, MTV VJ during the 1990s, actor and musician
- George Stephanopoulos – chief political correspondent for ABC News, co-anchor of Good Morning America
- Lesley Visser – sportscaster, Boston Globe sportswriter, co-host of The NFL Today
- Suzyn Waldman – sportscaster for WCBS-AM and color commentator for the New York Yankees
- Mike Wallace – television personality and journalist, 60 Minutes correspondent

== Early settlers/colonists ==
- Roger Conant – credited with establishing the communities of Salem, Peabody, and Danvers
- Dorcas ye blackmore – one of the first African-Americans to settle in New England
- Joseph Hull – Barnstable
- John Murray – Athol
- Elizabeth Poole – founder of Taunton, in 1637; the first woman to have founded a town in the Americas
- Jonas Rice – first permanent settler and founder of Worcester

== Literature, journalism, and philosophy ==
=== A–D ===
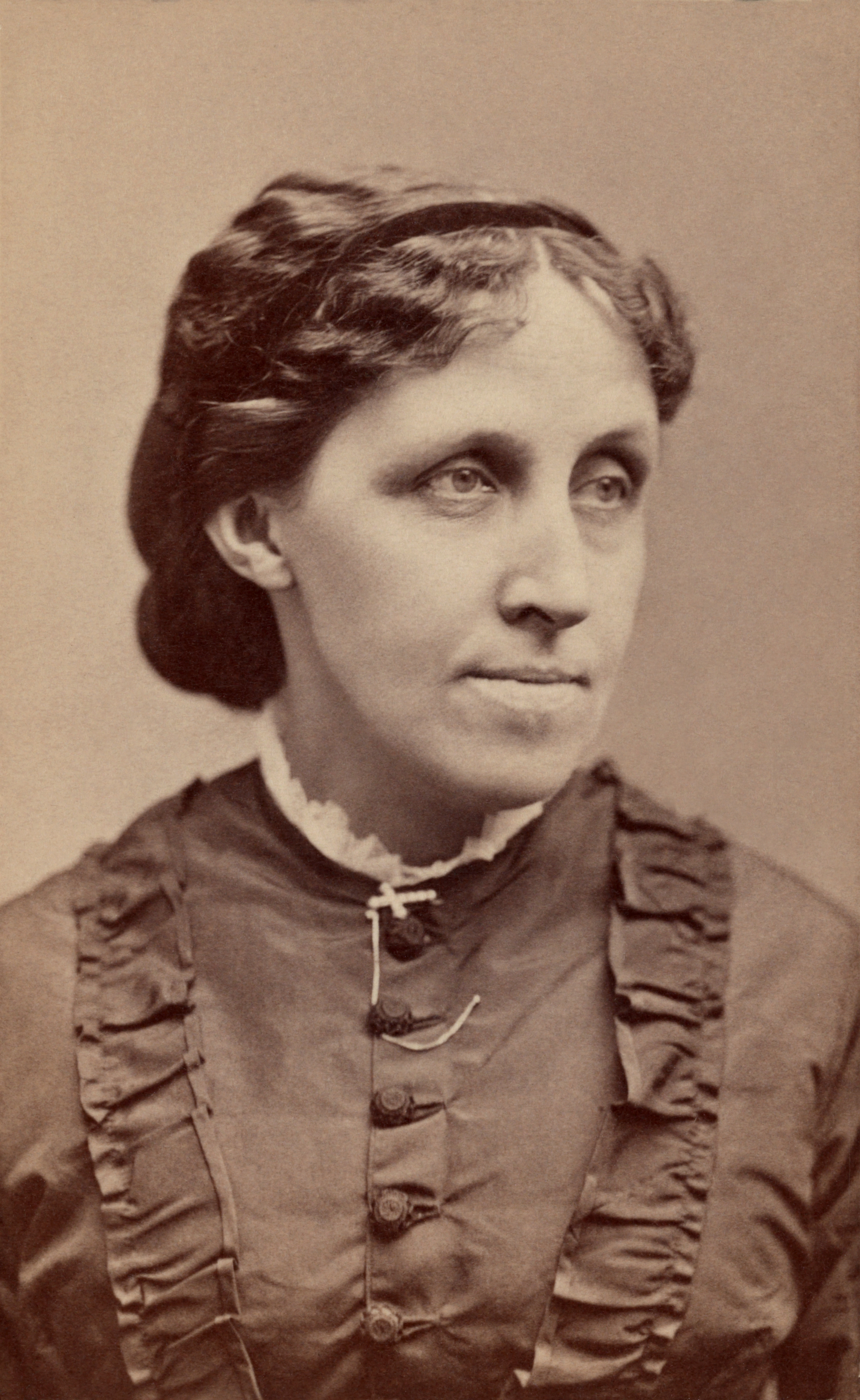
Louisa May Alcott

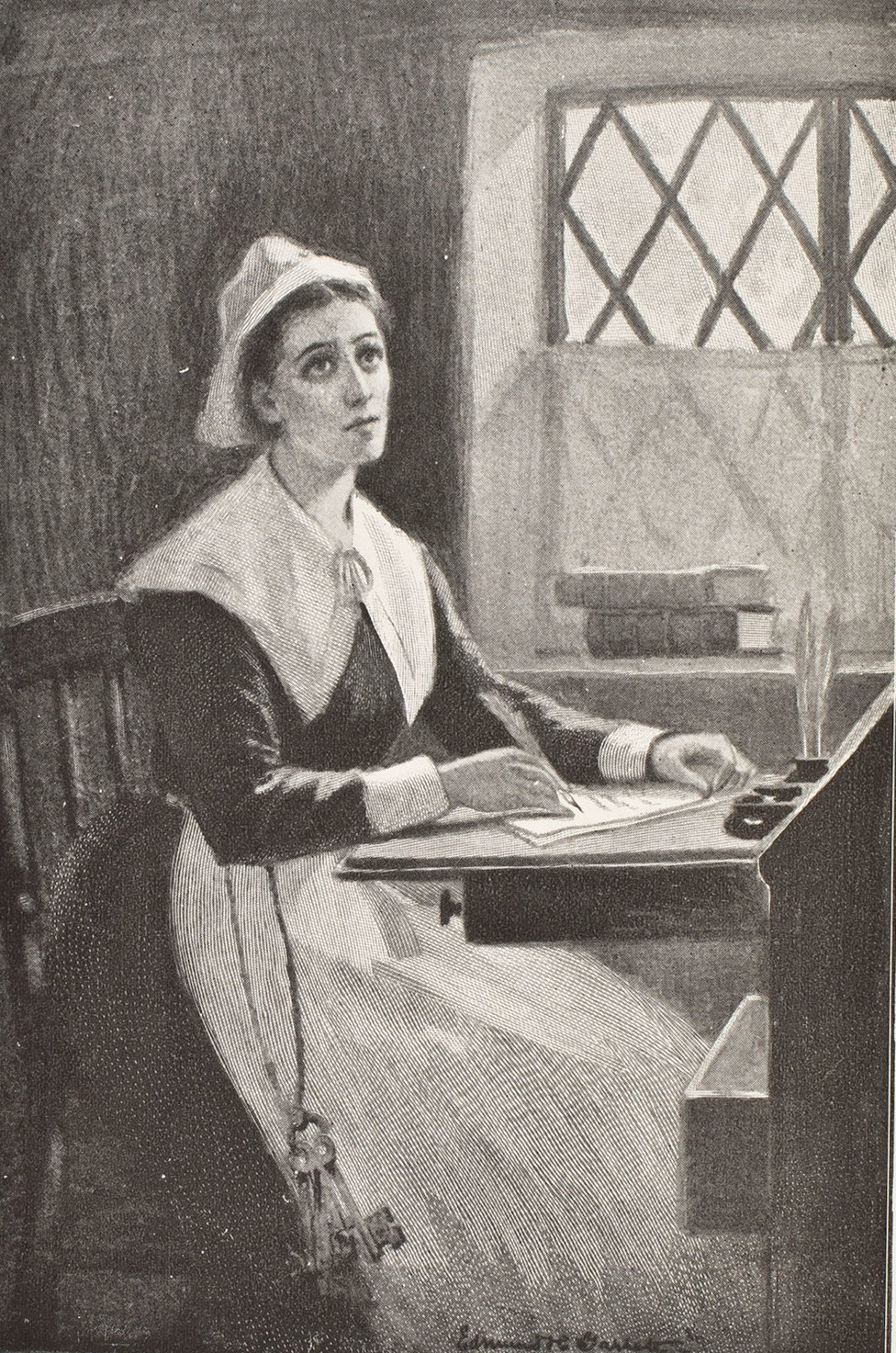
Anne Bradstreet

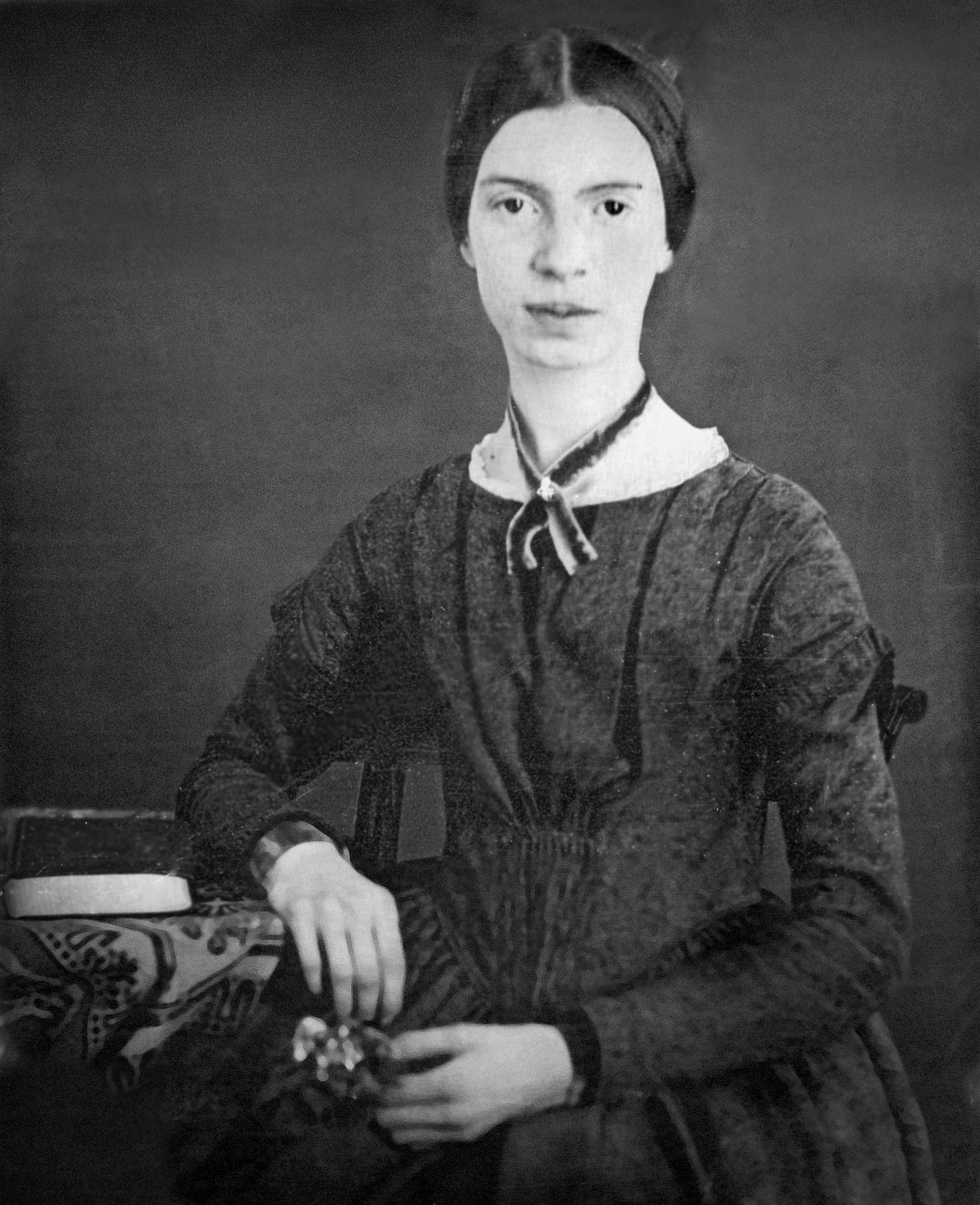
Emily Dickinson

- Francis Ellingwood Abbot – philosopher and theologian
- Herbert Baxter Adams – educator, historian
- Mary Hall Adams – editor, letter writer
- Amanda L. Aikens – editor, philanthropist
- Louisa May Alcott – author, Little Women (Concord)
- Emily Gillmore Alden – educator, author
- Lucy Morris Chaffee Alden – author, hymnwriter
- Susannah Valentine Aldrich – author, hymnwriter
- Horatio Alger Jr. – author
- Sarah Louise Arnold − educator, textbook author
- Amelia Atwater-Rhodes – author, In the Forests of the Night, Demon in my View (Concord)
- Martha Violet Ball – educator, philanthropist, activist, writer, editor
- Mike Barnicle – journalist
- Catharine Webb Barber – newspaper editor, author
- Clara Bancroft Beatley − educator, lecturer, author
- Peter Beinart – journalist (Cambridge)
- Edward Bellamy – author and socialist
- Amalie Benjamin – journalist, The Boston Globe
- James Bennet – editor-in-chief of The Atlantic
- Ella A. Bigelow – author, clubwoman
- Lettie S. Bigelow – poet and author
- Elizabeth Bishop – poet (Worcester)
- Mary Agnes Dalrymple Bishop – journalist, newspaper editor
- Benjamin C. Bradlee – editor-in-chief and vice president of the Washington Post, author, journalist
- Anne Bradstreet – poet
- Joseph Breck – author, magazine editor, publisher (Medfield)
- Howard Bryant – sports journalist for ESPN
- William Cullen Bryant – poet
- Clara Louise Burnham – novelist
- Augusten Burroughs – author of Running with Scissors (Amherst)
- Robert Ellis Cahill – sheriff, politician, folklorist, author, some three dozen books on New England history and lore (Salem)
- John Casey – author
- Mary Bassett Clarke – writer
- Helen Field Comstock – poet, philanthropist
- Harriet Abbott Lincoln Coolidge – author, philanthropist, reformer
- Robert Cormier – author, columnist (Leominster)
- Bernard Cornwell – created Richard Sharpe (Chatham)
- Sibylla Bailey Crane – educator, composer, writer
- Robert Creeley – poet (Arlington, Acton)
- E. E. Cummings – poet (Cambridge)
- Martha E. Sewall Curtis – suffragist, writer
- Steve Curwood – journalist, author (Boston)
- Cora Linn Daniels – author
- Stephen Daye – printer
- Donald Davidson – philosopher
- Emily Dickinson – poet (Amherst)
- E. J. Dionne – liberal op-ed columnist for The Washington Post (Boston)
- W. E. B. Du Bois – author, editor, historian, The Souls of Black Folk (Great Barrington)
- Andre Dubus III – author
- Will Durant – writer, historian, philosopher (North Adams)

=== E–G ===
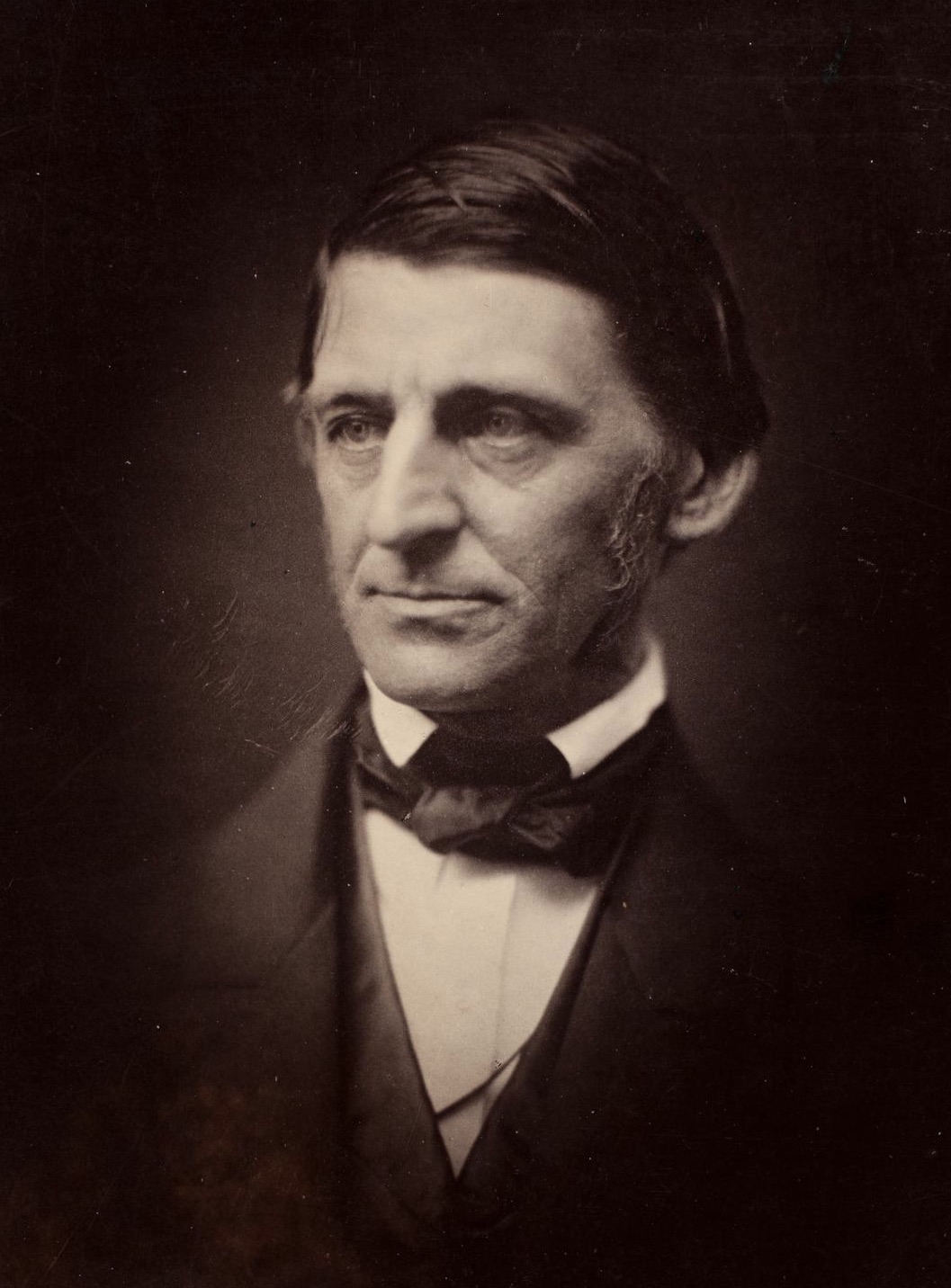
Ralph Waldo Emerson

- Mary F. Eastman – educator, writer, suffragist
- Gordon Edes – sports journalist
- Dave Eggers – author
- Ralph Waldo Emerson – poet, Nature, The Transcendentalist (Concord)
- Lizzie P. Evans-Hansell – novelist, short story writer
- Jessie Forsyth – newspaper editor, temperance advocate
- Harriet Putnam Fowler – author, poet
- George Frazier – journalist (Boston)
- Robert Frost – poet (Lawrence)
- Linda Gaboriau – dramaturg and literary translator (Boston)
- Nicholas Gage – writer and journalist (Worcester)
- John Kenneth Galbraith – author, educator, and public official
- Peter Gammons – sportswriter (Boston)
- Anna Gardner – abolitionist, poet
- Khalil Gibran – artist, poet, writer
- George Gilder – author, intellectual (Tyringham)
- Ellen Goodman – journalist, syndicated columnist
- Edward Gorey – author and illustrator
- Cynthia Roberts Gorton – poet, author
- Hattie Tyng Griswold – writer, poet

=== H–M ===
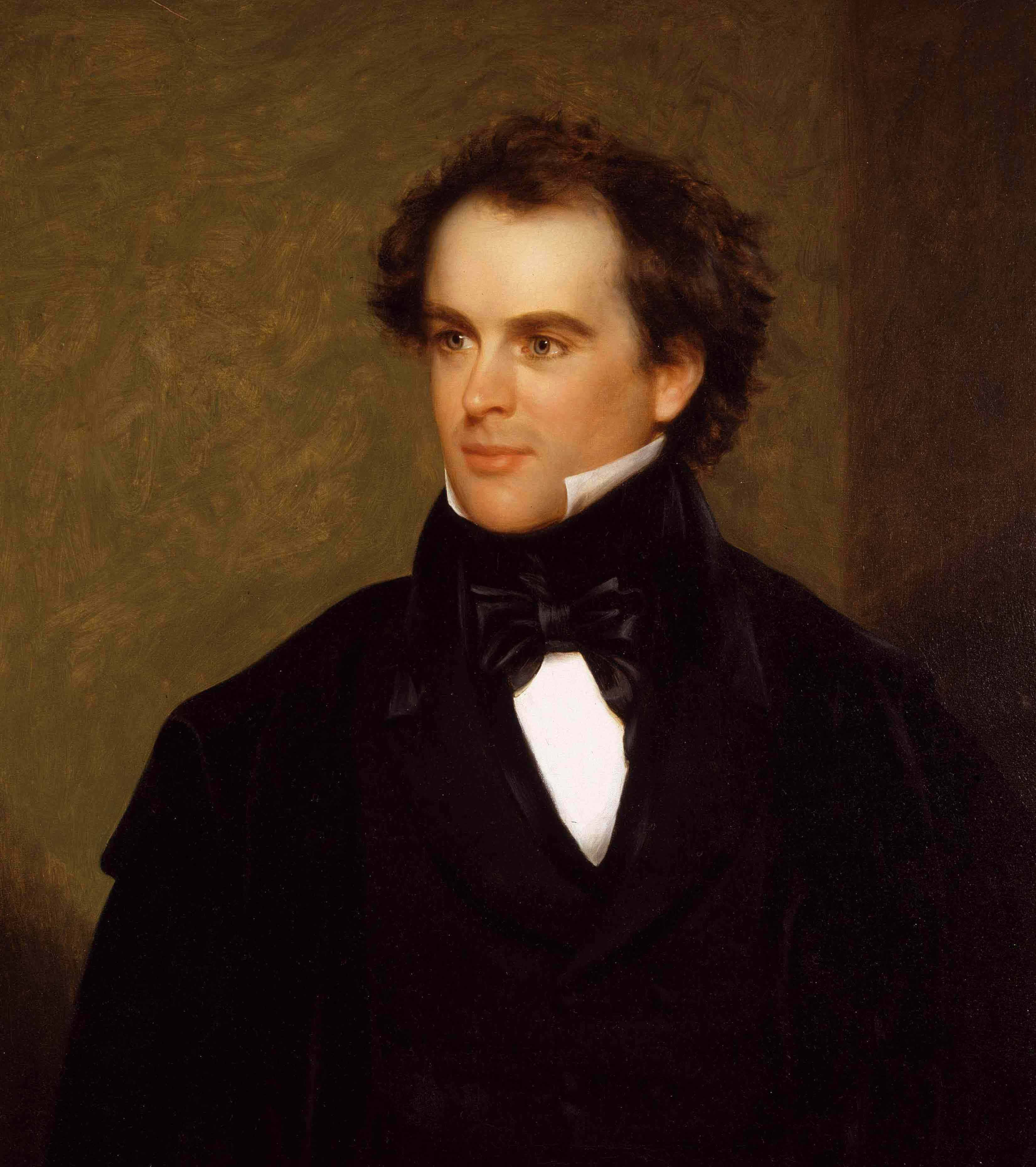
Nathaniel Hawthorne

- Lucie Caroline Hager – author
- Mary Whitwell Hale – hymnwriter
- Nathaniel Hawthorne – author, The Scarlet Letter (Salem)
- Eliza Putnam Heaton – journalist, editor
- Nat Hentoff – historian, novelist, music critic (Boston)
- Grace Hibbard – writer, poet
- George V. Higgins – columnist, author, The Friends of Eddie Coyle
- M. E. Hirsh – novelist
- Louise Manning Hodgkins – educator, author, editor
- Oliver Wendell Holmes Sr. – poet and essayist (Cambridge)
- Lucy Hooper – poet
- Helen Maria Hunt Jackson – author
- Katharine Johnson Jackson – physician, writer
- Charlotte A. Jerauld – poet, writer
- S. O. Johnson – author
- Rebecca Richardson Joslin – writer, lecturer, benefactor, clubwoman
- Sebastian Junger – author, journalist
- Janice Kaplan – novelist, magazine editor
- Marina Keegan – author, playwright (Wayland)
- Jack Kerouac – author, On the Road (Lowell)
- Ronald Kessler – journalist, author, In the President's Secret Service (Belmont)
- Richard Kindleberger – reporter, editor, The Boston Globe (Lincoln)
- Peter King – sportswriter, author
- Jonathan Kozol – author, educator, activist
- Stanley Kunitz – poet, Poet Laureate of the United States (Worcester)
- Peter Laird – comic book creator of the Teenage Mutant Ninja Turtles
- Timothy Leary – psychologist, author, Turn On, Tune In, Drop Out (Springfield)
- Dennis Lehane – author
- Mark Leibovich – journalist and author, The New Imperialists (Boston)
- Henry Cabot Lodge – author and public official
- Henry Wadsworth Longfellow (1807–1882) – author
- Amy Lowell – Pulitzer Prize-winning poet
- James Russell Lowell – poet (Fireside Poets)
- Robert Lowell – poet
- Hannah Lyman – biographer
- Michael Patrick MacDonald – author, activist, All Souls (South Boston)
- William Manchester – author and biographer
- William Marston – comic book writer, co-created Wonder Woman
- Tony Massarotti – sportswriter, The Boston Globe (Waltham)
- Stephen McCauley – The Object of My Affection (Woburn)
- Will McDonough – sportswriter for the Boston Globe (South Boston)
- Eileen McNamara – columnist, The Boston Globe (Cambridge)
- Susan Minot – novelist, short story writer (Boston, Manchester)
- Hillary Monahan – author
- Robin Moore – author, The Green Berets (Boston)
- Mary L. Moreland – minister, evangelist, suffragist, author
- Orson Desaix Munn – publisher of Scientific American (Monson)

=== N–Z ===
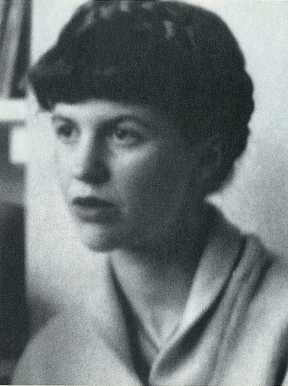
Sylvia Plath

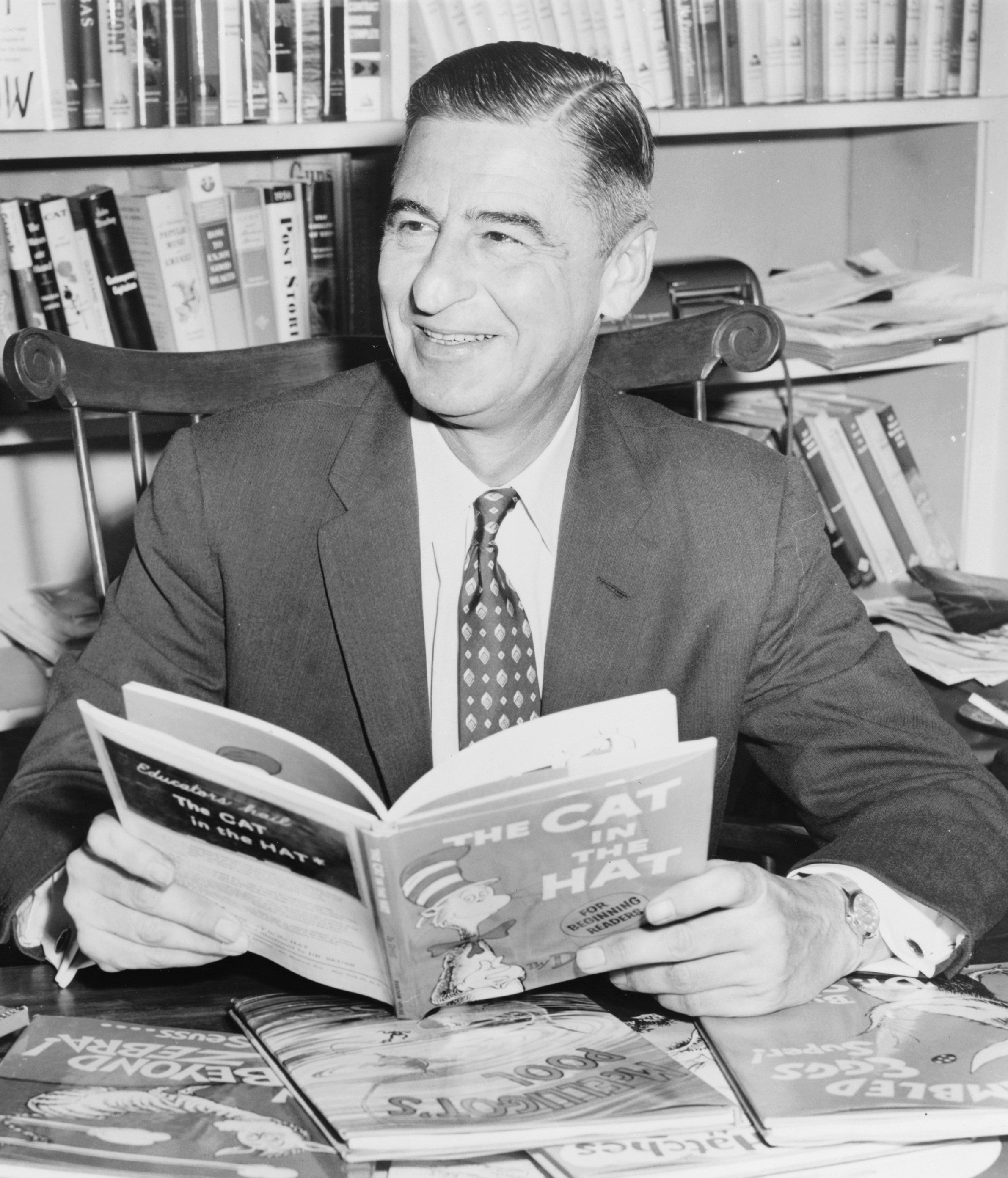
Dr. Seuss

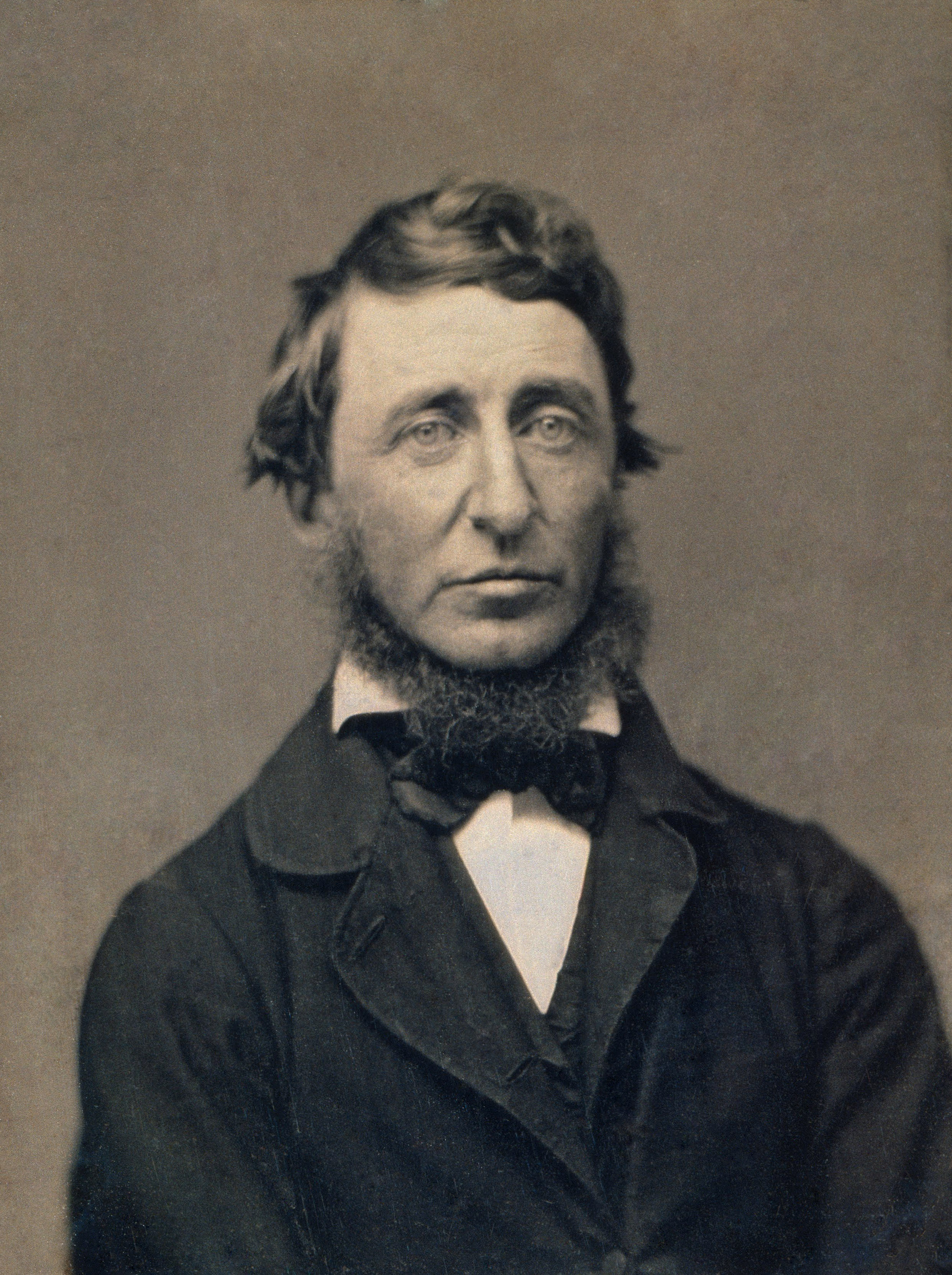
Henry David Thoreau

- Marvin Olasky – author, editor-in-chief of WORLD Magazine
- Grace A. Oliver – author, social reformer
- Charles Olson – poet (Worcester)
- Robert B. Parker – author (Springfield)
- Annie Stevens Perkins – writer
- Bliss Perry – literary critic, writer, editor (Williamstown)
- Maude Gillette Phillips – author, educator
- Charlie Pierce – sportswriter, political blogger, author
- Daniel Pipes – author, In the Path of God (Boston, Cambridge)
- Eliza A. Pittsinger – poet
- Sylvia Plath – poet, author, and essayist, The Bell Jar (Boston)
- Edgar Allan Poe – author and poet, "The Raven", "The Fall of the House of Usher" (Boston)
- Cora Scott Pond Pope – pageant writer, suffragist
- Rufus Porter – founder of Scientific American magazine (Boxford)
- Douglas Preston – author, The Book of the Dead (Cambridge)
- Dora Knowlton Ranous – actress, author, editor, translator
- Jane Maria Read – poet
- John Rennie – editor-in-chief of Scientific American magazine
- Bob Ryan – sportswriter for The Boston Globe
- R.A. Salvatore – author (Leominster)
- George Santayana – philosopher, essayist, poet, novelist, The Life of Reason (Boston)
- Caroline M. Sawyer – poet, biographer, editor
- Daniel Scott – author, Some of Us Have to Get Up in the Morning, Pay This Amount (Braintree)
- Horace Scudder – man of letters, editor
- Dr. Seuss – born Theodor Seuss Geisel, author, poet and illustrator (Springfield)
- Anne Sexton – poet (Newton)
- Mark Shasha – author
- Harriette R. Shattuck – writer, suffragist
- Dan Shaughnessy – sportswriter (Groton)
- Anita Shreve – author
- Kyle Smith – film critic, novelist, essayist
- Jeff Stein – columnist
- Jane Agnes Stewart (1860−1944) – author, editor, and contributor to periodicals
- Lothrop Stoddard – political scientist, historian, journalist, anthropologist, eugenicist
- Clara Harrison Stranahan – author
- Lucy Switzer – social activist, writer
- Sabrina Tavernise – journalist (Granville)
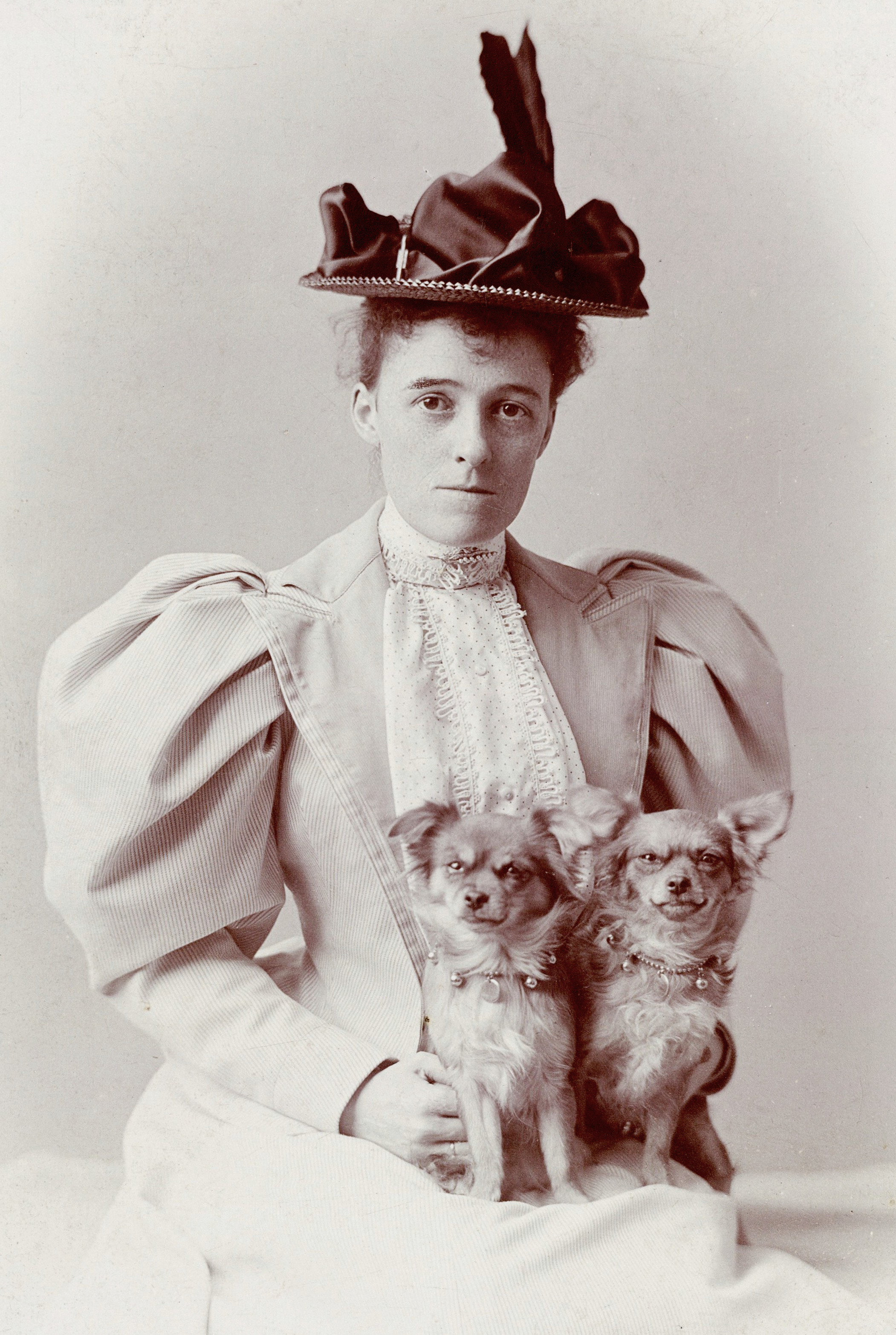
- Edith Wharton
  Michelle Tea – Rent Girl (Chelsea)
- Henry David Thoreau – philosopher, author, Walden (Concord)
- Eliza Townsend – poet
- John Updike – author
- Annie Russell Wall – historian, writer, teacher
- Julia Rush Cutler Ward – occasional poet
- Lillie Eginton Warren – educator, author
- Anna Cabot Quincy Waterston – writer
- Edith Wharton – author
- Phillis Wheatley – first African-American woman to publish a book of poetry
- John Greenleaf Whittier – poet and abolitionist
- Celeste M. A. Winslow – author
- Susan H. Wixon – author, editor, feminist
- Thomas E. Woods Jr. – author, historian (North Andover)
- Jane Yolen – author

== Military ==
Henry Knox

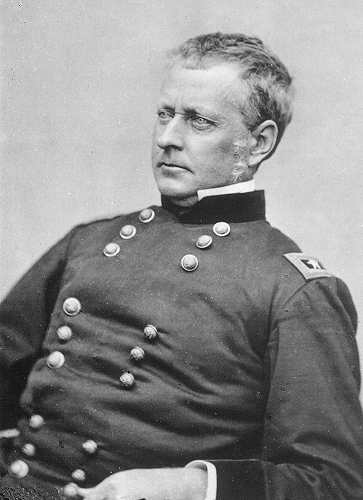
Joseph Hooker

- Clarence Lionel Adcock – US Army, deputy to General Lucius D. Clay in 1946
- Nathaniel M. Allen – soldier in Civil War, awarded Medal of Honor
- George Bancroft – secretary of the Navy and founder of the US Naval Academy
- Timothy Bigelow – Revolutionary War patriot
- William Francis Buckley – US Army officer and CIA operative; died in 1985 while being tortured by the Islamist group Hezbollah
- William Harvey Carney – African-American soldier in Civil War
- George W. Casey Jr. – US Army general and chief of staff of the United States Army
- Christopher Cassidy – US Navy SEAL, NASA astronaut
- David Cohen (1917–2020) – member of the US Army, a liberator of the Ohrdruf concentration camp, and schoolteacher
- Joseph Dunford – US Marine Corps general, chairman of the Joint Chiefs of Staff under Barack Obama
- John Wesley Emerson – Civil War commander
- General John Galvin – retired US Army; former dean of The Fletcher School at Tufts University
- Adolphus Greely – Polar explorer, US Army officer and recipient of the Medal of Honor
- Joseph Hooker – commander of the Army of the Potomac in the Civil War
- Cyprian Howe (1726–1806) – colonel in the American Revolutionary War
- Joseph P. Kennedy Jr. – US Navy lieutenant, killed in action during World War II
- Henry Knox – officer in the Continental Army, 1st United States Secretary of War
- Barry McCaffrey – four-star Army General, Director of the Office of National Drug Control Policy
- George Patton IV (1923–2004) – major general in the U.S. Army
- Israel Putnam – major general in the American Revolutionary War
- Elmer J. Rogers Jr. (1903–2002) – United States Air Force lieutenant general
- Andrew Jackson Smith – African-American soldier in the Civil War
- Robert Gould Shaw – US officer in Union Army, commanded the 54th Massachusetts Infantry Regiment
- Charles Pomeroy Stone – soldier, explorer, and engineer
- Ralph Talbot (1897–1918) – US Marine Corps pilot during World War I, Medal of Honor
- Steven N. Wickstrom – Army National Guard major general who commanded the 42nd Infantry Division

== Music ==
=== Classical music ===
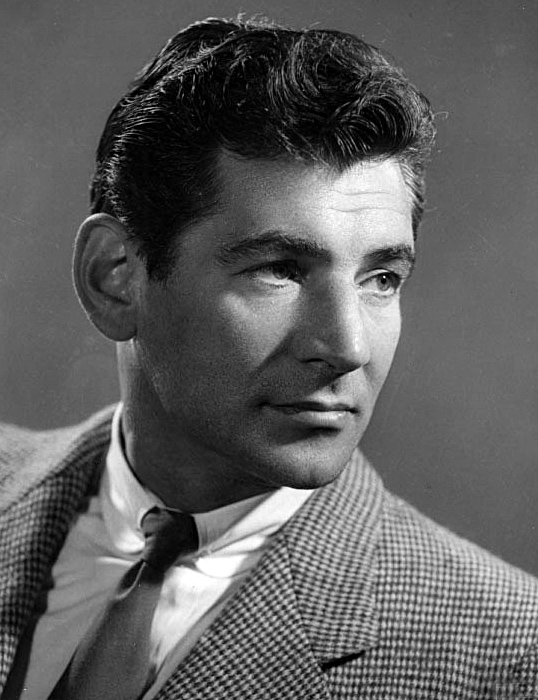
Leonard Bernstein

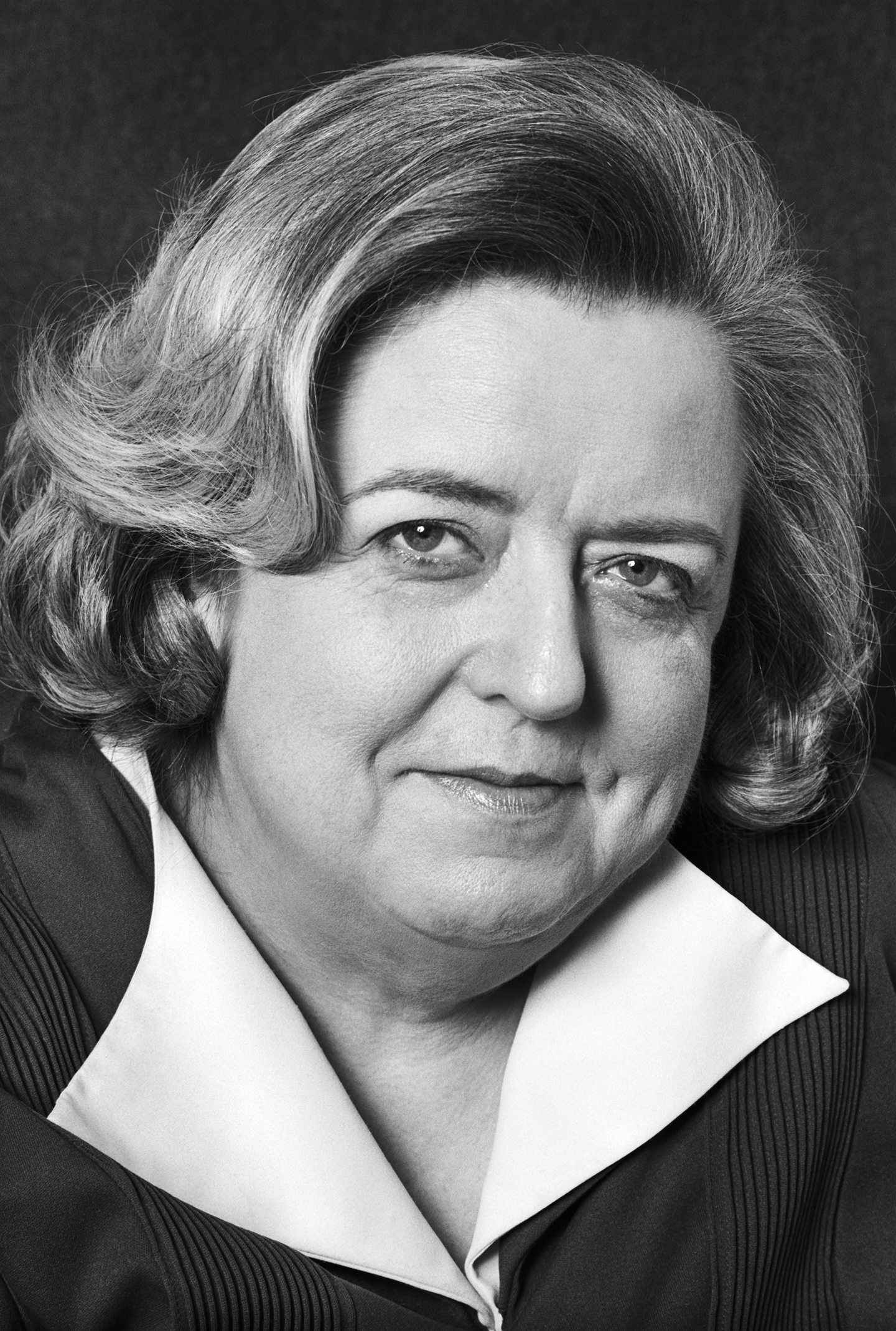
Sarah Caldwell

- John Coolidge Adams (born 1947) – composer (contemporary classical with strong roots in minimalism)
- Samuel Adler (born 1928) – composer and conductor; lived and studied for a time in Massachusetts before moving to New York
- Leroy Anderson (1908–1975) – composer of short, light concert pieces
- Leonard Bernstein – conductor, composer, author, music lecturer and pianist of Ukrainian Jewish descent
- Sarah Caldwell (1924–2006) – opera conductor, impresario and stage director of opera
- Michael Gandolfi – composer of contemporary classical music
- Serge Koussevitzky (Russian: Сергей Александрович Кусевицкий) – born in Russia, composer; conductor, Boston Symphony Orchestra; professor to Leonard Bernstein, Samuel Adler and Sarah Caldwell
- Lowell Mason (1792–1872) – music director, banker and composer; set music to "Mary Had a Little Lamb"
- Walter Piston (1894–1976) – composer, music theorist and professor of Italian-American descent
- Roger Sessions (1896–1985) – composer, critic and teacher
- Randall Thompson (1899–1984) – composer of choral works

=== Other music ===
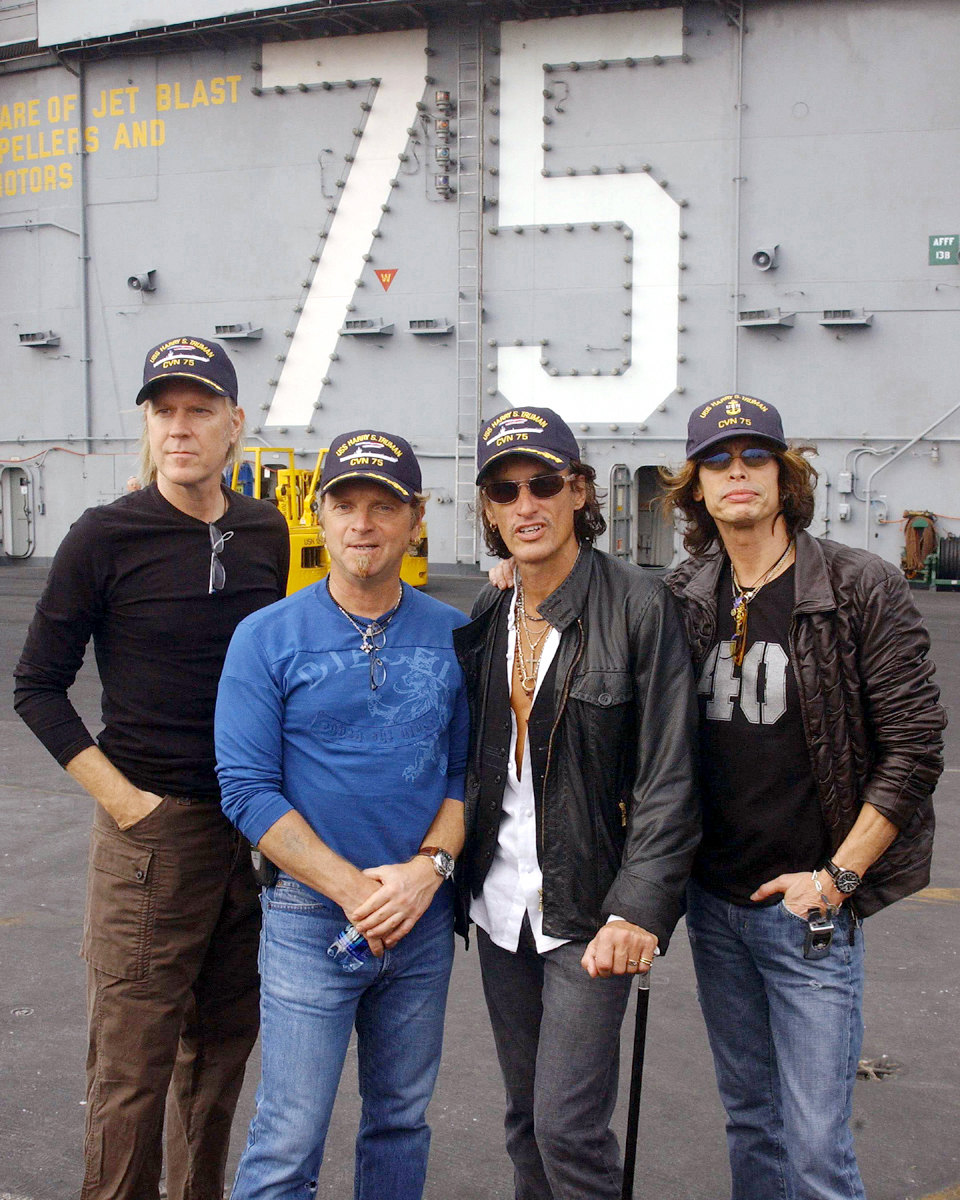
Aerosmith

==== A–M ====
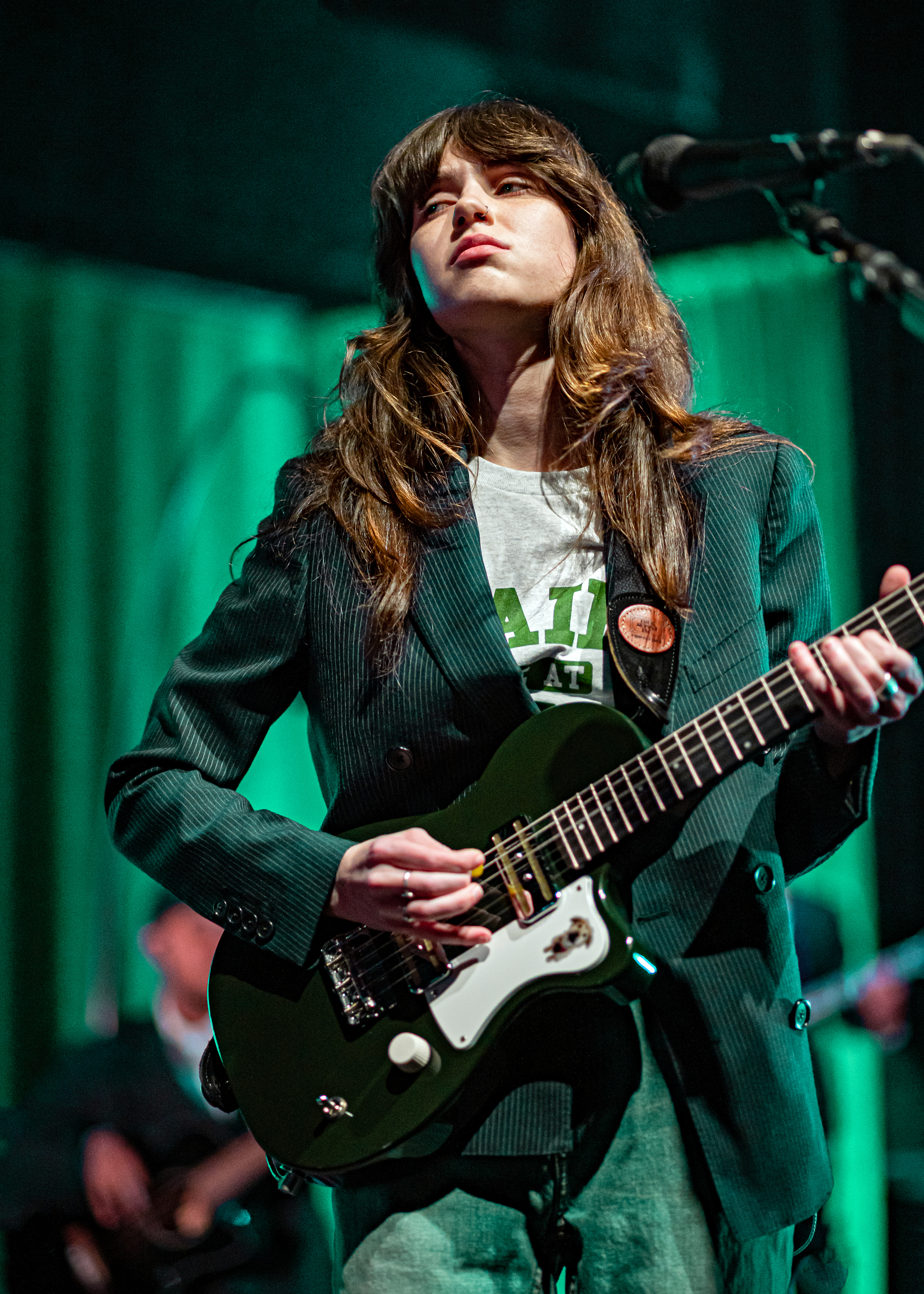
Clairo

- Akrobatik – rapper
- Rich Amiri – rapper
- Bell Biv Devoe – R&B group
- Nuno Bettencourt – singer and guitarist of the band Extreme
- Tracy Bonham – alternative-rock musician
- Bobby Brown – singer
- Michael Burkett (also known as Fat Mike; born in Massachusetts) – singer, bassist of the band NOFX and owner of Fat Wreck Chords record label
- Gary Cherone – rock singer and songwriter
- Roderick Chisholm – philosopher
- Neil Cicierega – singer and internet cult icon
- Clairo – indie pop singer
- Ray Conniff – easy-listening recording artist
- Cousin Stizz (from Dorchester) – rapper
- Sibylla Bailey Crane – art-song composer
- Rich Cronin – singer with the band LFO
- Danny Davis – country musician
- Brad Delp – lead singer of the former bands Boston, RTZ
- Tony Dize – singer
- Nicole Fiorentino – bass guitarist of the band The Smashing Pumpkins
- John Flansburgh – half of They Might Be Giants
- Thom Gimbel – rhythm guitar, saxophone, flute, keyboards, vocals for the band Foreigner
- Barry Goudreau – guitars, backing vocals for the bands Boston, RTZ, Ernie and the Automatics
- Norman Greenbaum – singer
- Tom Hamilton – bassist of the band Aerosmith
- Kay Hanley – singer for the band Letters to Cleo
- Sib Hashian – drums, percussion, backing vocals for the bands Boston , RTZ, Ernie and the Automatics
- Juliana Hatfield – guitarist, singer-songwriter
- Roy Haynes – jazz musician
- Pete Francis Heimbold – member of the band Dispatch
- Nicky Jam – singer, songwriter
- JoJo – singer
- Sonya Kitchell – singer-songwriter
- Joey Kramer – drummer for the band Aerosmith
- Jordan Knight – singer-songwriter
- Phil Labonte – singer of the band All That Remains
- Jack Landrón – folk singer-songwriter
- Aaron Lewis – lead vocalist and rhythm guitarist of the band Staind
- John Linnell – one half of They Might Be Giants
- Mary Lou Lord – singer, guitarist
- Joyner Lucas – rapper
- Taj Mahal – blues musician
- Ken Maiuri − musician, singer-songwriter, live keyboardist for the band The B-52s
- J Mascis – singer-songwriter, guitarist for the band Dinosaur Jr
- Jonah Matranga – singer-songwriter
- Andrew McMahon – singer, pianist
- Jo Dee Messina – country artist
- Angie Miller – singer-songwriter

==== N–Z ====
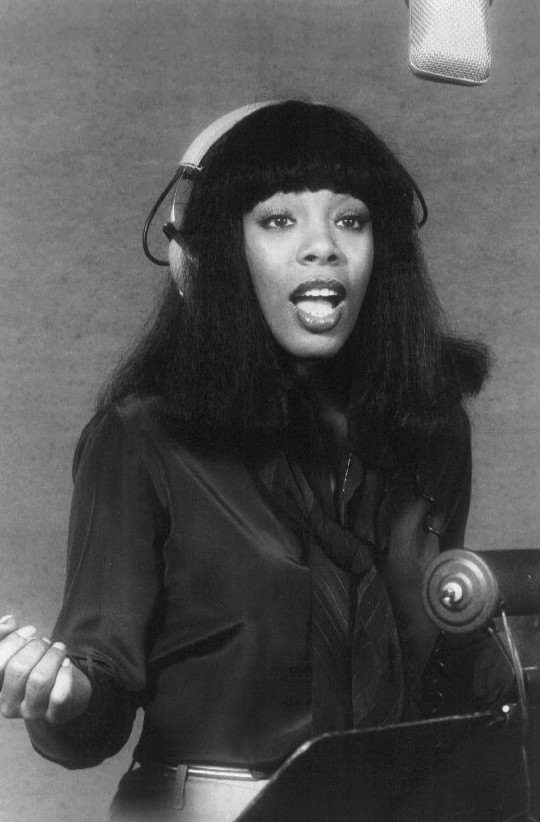
Donna Summer

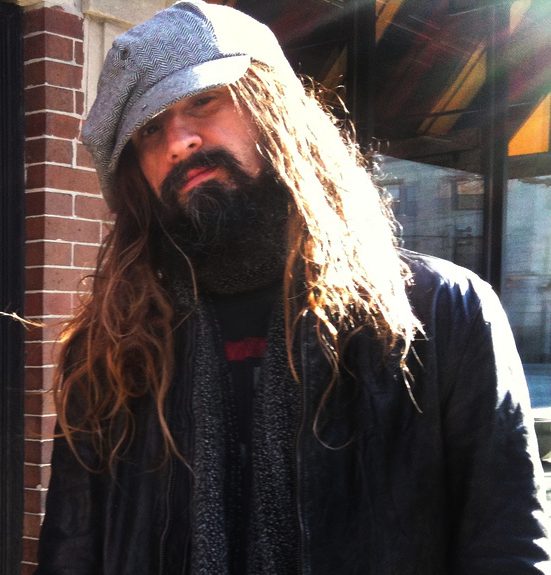
Rob Zombie

- Matt Nathanson – singer-songwriter
- Mike Ness – guitarist, singer-songwriter for the band Social Distortion
- Taecyeon Ok – actor, model, and member of the South Korean pop boy band 2PM
- Paul Pena – singer-songwriter and guitarist
- Joe Perry – guitarist, singer for the bands Aerosmith, The Joe Perry Project
- Linda Perry – singer-songwriter
- Bobby "Boris" Pickett – singer (novelty song "Monster Mash")
- Rachel Platten – singer-songwriter
- Ruth Pointer – singer-songwriter of the vocal group The Pointer Sisters
- Poppy (Moriah Rose Pereira) – musician and YouTube personality
- Alisan Porter – singer-songwriter and retired actress; winner of The Voice season 10
- Maia Reficco – singer
- Jonathan Richman – singer-songwriter in the band The Modern Lovers
- David Robinson – drummer for the band The Cars
- Buffy Sainte-Marie - singer-songwriter and activist
- Tom Scholz – musician, composer for the band Boston
- Carly Simon – musician, singer, composer
- Slaine – hip-hop MC
- Slut Boy Billy – rapper
- Spider One – singer
- Billy Squier – rock musician
- Quinn Sullivan – guitarist, singer
- Donna Summer – singer-songwriter
- James Taylor – singer-songwriter, instrumentalist
- Meghan Trainor – singer-songwriter
- Chad Stokes Urmston – member of the band Dispatch
- Brad Whitford – singer, guitarist for the band Aerosmith
- Alan Wilson – guitarist and singer for the band Canned Heat
- Rob Zombie – singer, director

== Native Americans ==
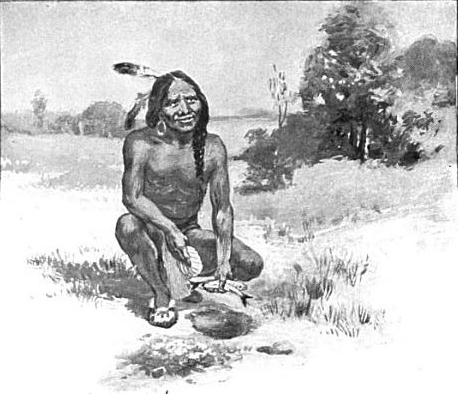
Squanto

- Crispus Attucks (see below)
- Caleb Cheeshahteaumuck – first Native American graduate of Harvard University (Wampanoag)
- Massasoit – Chief of the Wampanoag tribe in 1621 (Wampanoag)
- Passaconaway – Chief of the Pennacook tribe (Pennacook)
- King Philip – war chief (Wampanoag)
- Samoset – first Native American to make contact with the Pilgrims (Abenaki)
- Squanto – helped the Pilgrims in their first visit to the New World (Wampanoag)

== People involved in the American Revolution ==
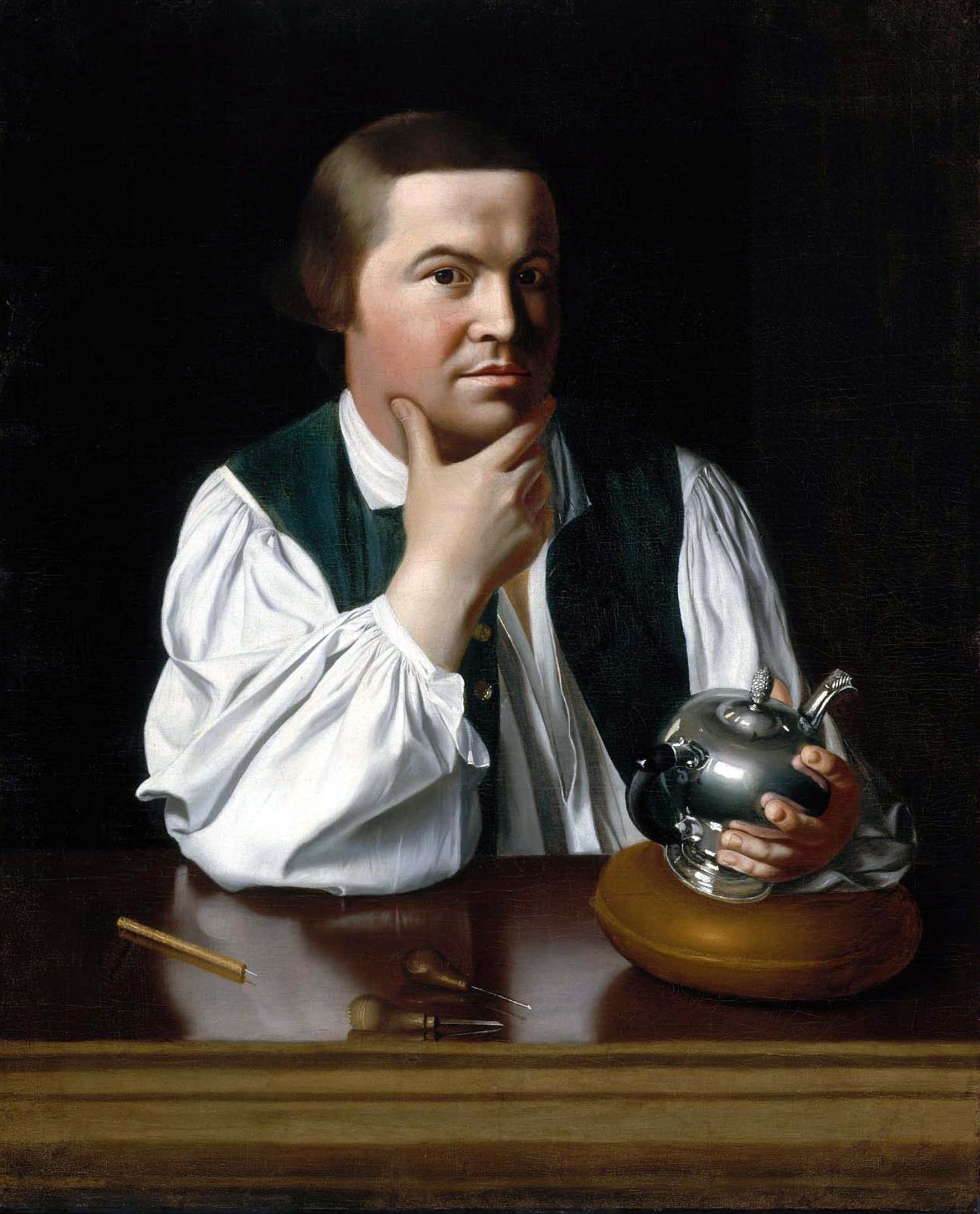
Paul Revere

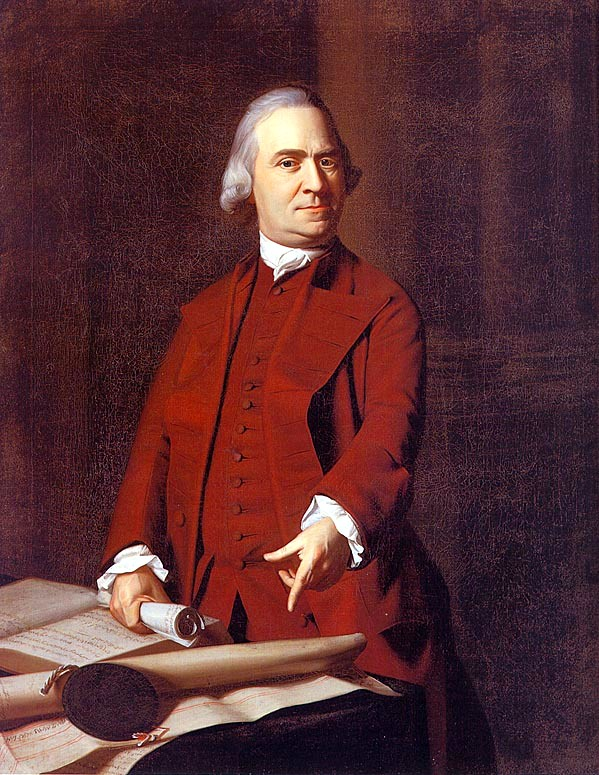
Samuel Adams

- John Adams – patriot; 2nd president and 1st vice president of the United States
- Samuel Adams – 4th governor of Massachusetts and delegate to the Continental Congress
- Crispus Attucks – first casualty of the American Revolutionary War
- Edward Bancroft – physician and spy for both the U.S. and Britain during the Revolution
- Timothy Bigelow – patriot, colonel of the 15th Massachusetts Regiment of the Continental Army
- Benjamin Church – first Surgeon General of the United States Army
- Isaac Davis – commanded Minutemen during Battles of Lexington and Concord, logo of the National Guard
- Thomas Dawes – colonel in Massachusetts militia
- William Dawes – rode with Paul Revere during "Midnight Ride"
- William Eustis – physician, military surgeon at Battle of Bunker Hill, 12th governor of Massachusetts
- John Glover – brigadier general in the Continental Army
- John Hancock – 1st and 3rd governor of Massachusetts and President of the Continental Congress
- James Otis – lawyer; known for his catchphrase "No taxation without representation"
- Robert Treat Paine – signer of the Declaration of Independence and 1st attorney general of Massachusetts
- John Parker – farmer, minuteman during the Battles of Lexington and Concord
- Samuel Prescott – only participant of "Midnight Ride" to reach Concord
- William Prescott – colonel during the Battle of Bunker Hill
- Josiah Quincy II – Boston lawyer
- Paul Revere – silversmith; patriot; known for his "Midnight Ride"
- Deborah Sampson – disguised herself as a man in the Continental Army
- Artemus Ward – major general in the American Revolution; Congressman from Massachusetts
- Joseph Warren – physician; president of the Massachusetts Provincial Congress
- Mercy Otis Warren – political writer and propagandist of the American Revolution

== Politics and government ==
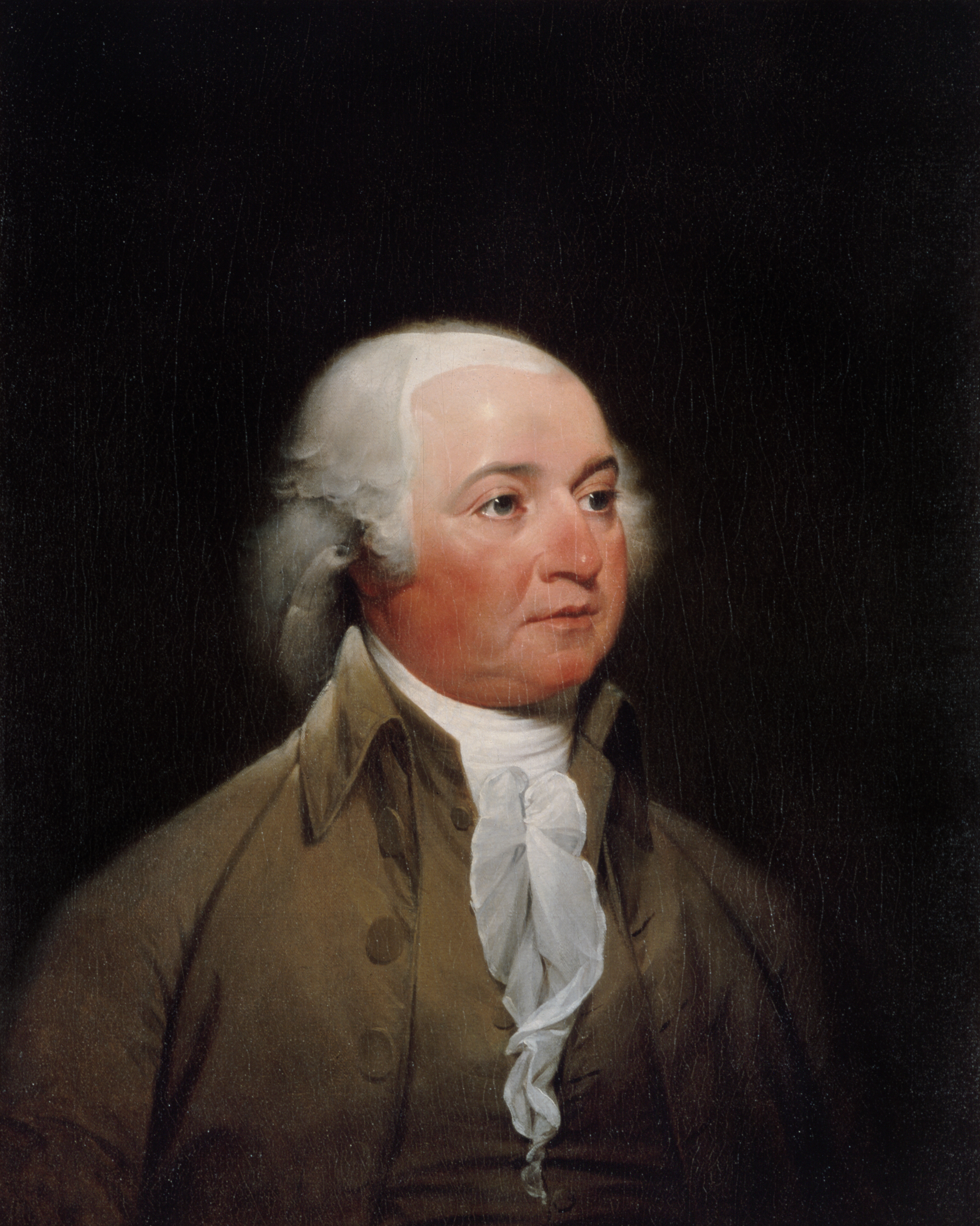
John Adams

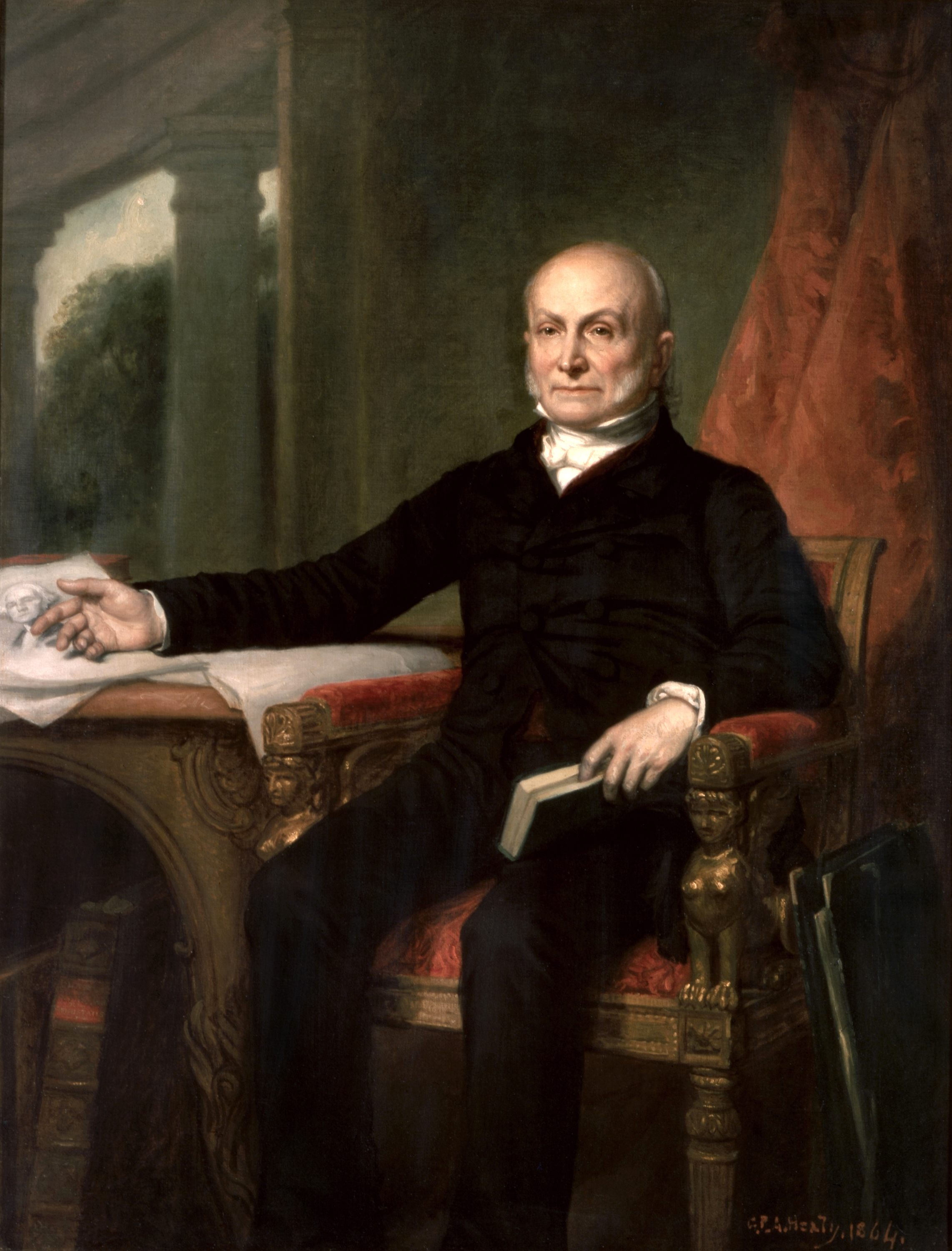
John Quincy Adams

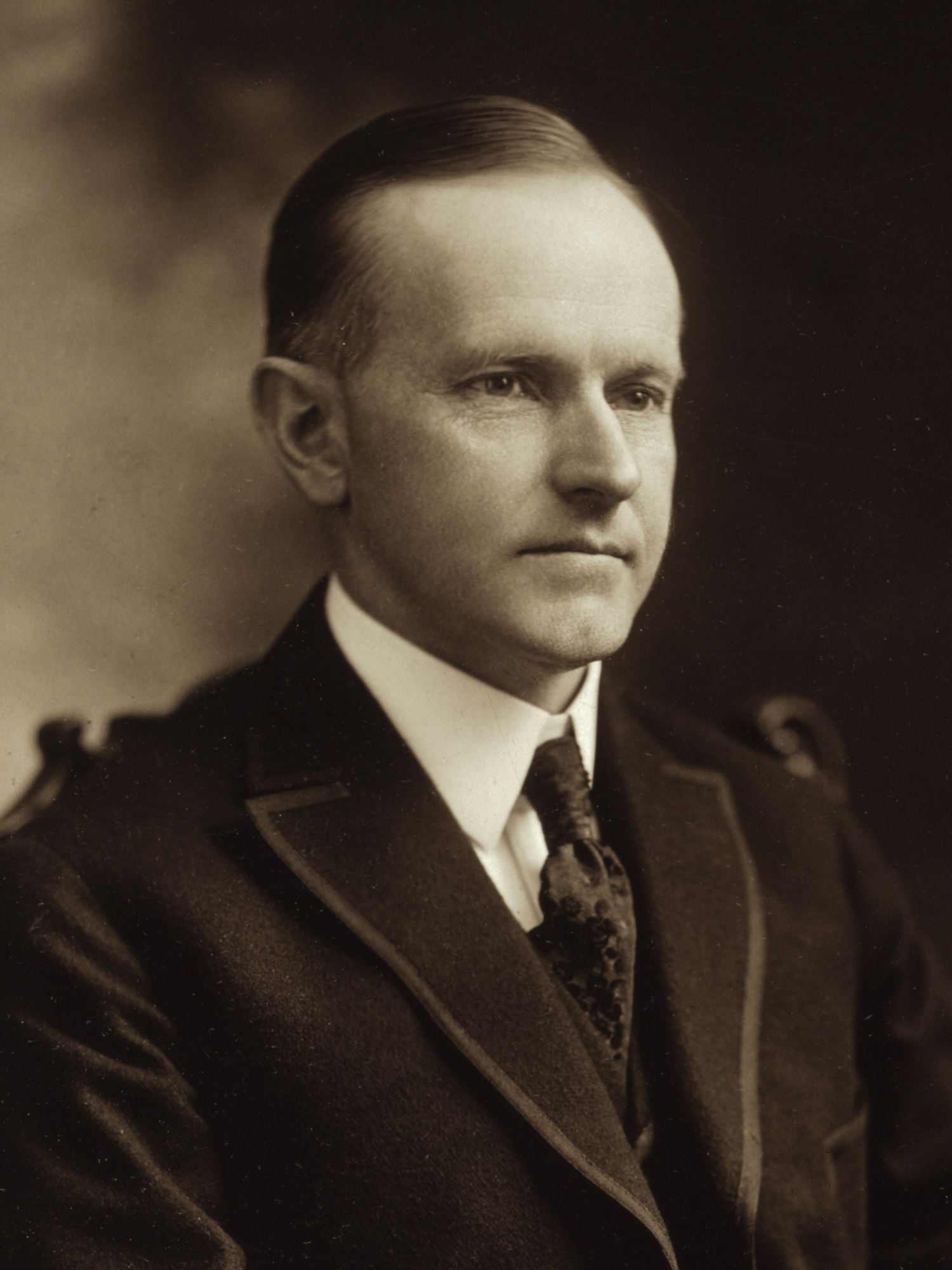
Calvin Coolidge

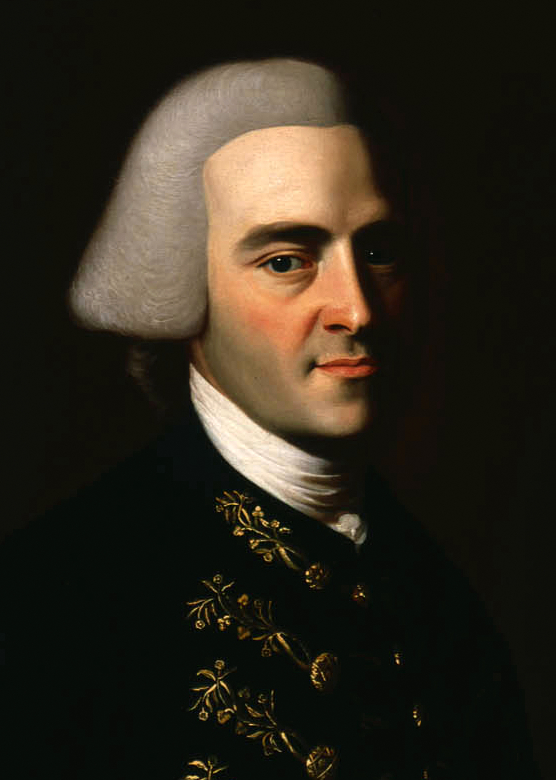
John Hancock

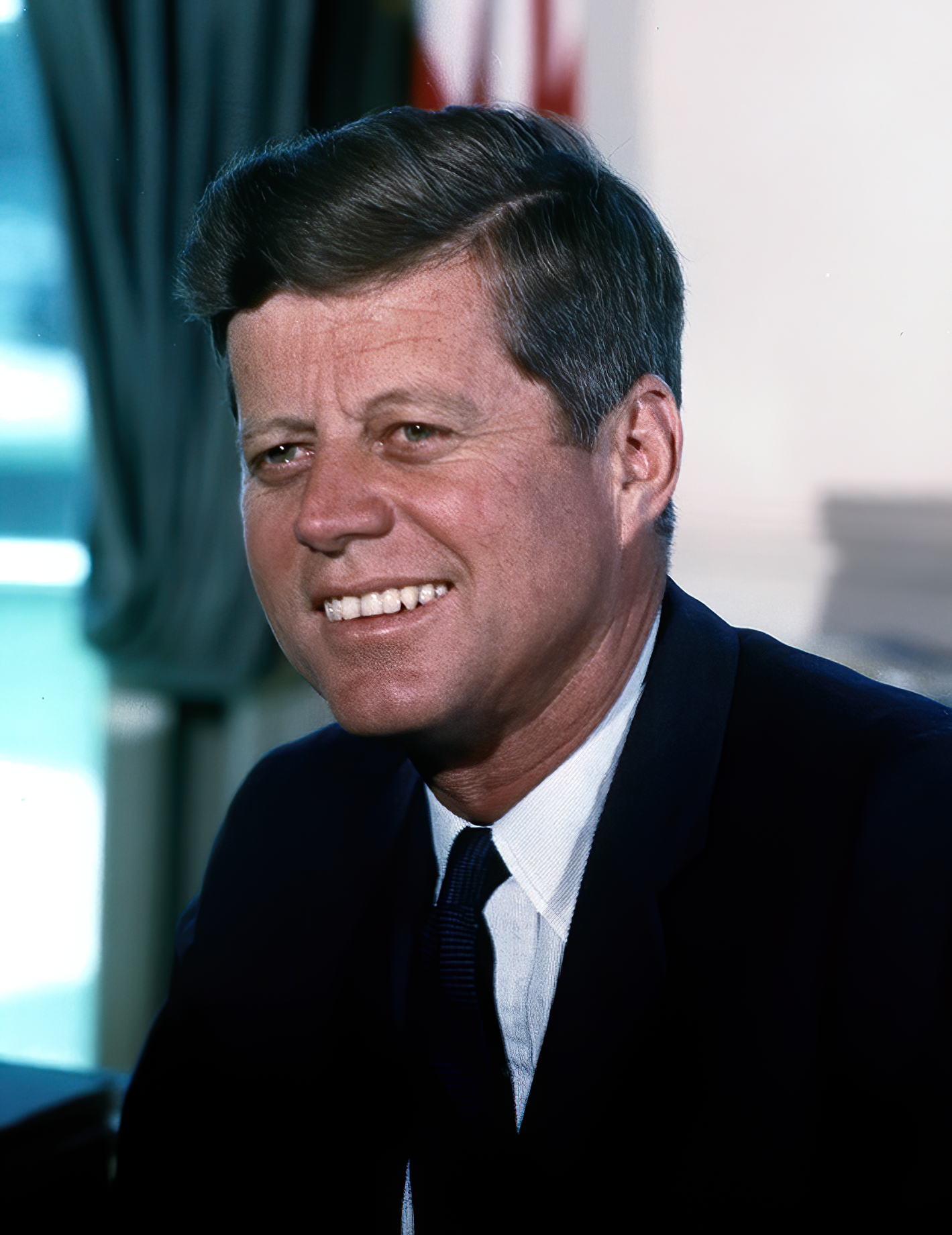
John F. Kennedy

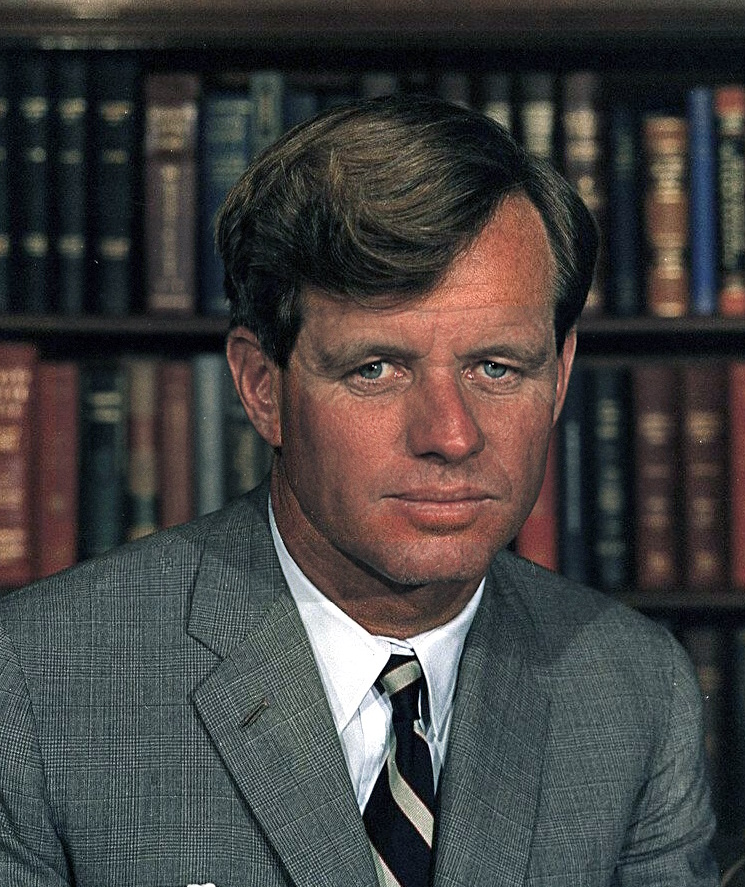
Robert F. Kennedy

=== Presidents ===
- John Adams (1735–1826) – 2nd president of the United States
- John Quincy Adams (1767–1848) – 6th president of the United States
- George H. W. Bush (1924–2018) – 41st president of the United States
- Calvin Coolidge (1872–1933) – 30th president of the United States
- John F. Kennedy (1917–1963) – 35th president of the United States

=== Vice presidents ===
- John Adams (1735–1826) – 1st vice president of the United States
- George H. W. Bush (1924–2018) – 43rd vice president of the United States
- Calvin Coolidge (1872–1933) – 29th vice president of the United States
- Elbridge Gerry (1744–1814) – 5th vice president of the United States (namesake of gerrymandering)
- Henry Wilson (1812–1875) – 18th vice president of the United States

=== Governors ===
- Samuel Adams (1722–1803) – 4th governor of Massachusetts and delegate to the Continental Congress
- Charlie Baker (born 1956) – 72nd governor of Massachusetts
- James Bowdoin (1726–1790) – 2nd governor of Massachusetts
- Paul Cellucci (1948–2013) – 69th governor of Massachusetts and U.S. ambassador to Canada
- James Michael Curley (1874–1958) – 35th mayor of Boston and 53rd governor of Massachusetts
- Calvin Coolidge (1872–1933) – 48th governor of Massachusetts
- Michael Dukakis (born 1933) – 65th and 67th governor of Massachusetts and 1988 Democratic presidential nominee
- Edward Everett (1794–1865) – 15th governor of Massachusetts; U.S. secretary of state; remembered for his two-hour speech at Gettysburg
- Elbridge Gerry (1744–1814) – 9th governor of Massachusetts
- John Hancock (1737–1793) – 1st and 3rd governor of Massachusetts and president of the Continental Congress
- Thomas Hutchinson (1711–1780) – colonial governor
- Levi Lincoln Sr. (1749–1820) – U.S. attorney general, U.S. secretary of state and governor of Massachusetts (acting)
- Deval Patrick (born 1956) – 71st governor of Massachusetts
- Mitt Romney (born 1947) – 70th governor of Massachusetts, 2012 Republican presidential nominee
- Jane Swift (born 1965) – acting governor of Massachusetts
- John A. Volpe (1908–1994) – U.S. secretary of transportation under President Nixon and 61st and 63rd Governor of Massachusetts
- David I. Walsh (1872–1947) – U.S. senator and 46th governor of Massachusetts
- Bill Weld (born 1945) – 68th governor of Massachusetts, 2016 Libertarian vice-presidential nominee

=== United States senators ===
- Edward Brooke (1919–2015) – U.S. senator from Massachusetts; first African-American popularly elected to the Senate
- Henry L. Dawes (1816–1903) – U.S. senator from Massachusetts; notable for the Dawes Act
- Paul Douglas (1892–1976) – U.S. senator from Illinois (born in Salem, Massachusetts)
- John F. Kennedy (1917–1963) – U.S. senator and congressman from Massachusetts
- Robert F. Kennedy (1925–1968) – U.S. attorney general and U.S. senator from New York (born in Brookline, Massachusetts)
- Ted Kennedy (1932–2009) – longtime U.S. senator from Massachusetts
- John Kerry (born 1943) – U.S. senator from Massachusetts, U.S. secretary of state, and 2004 Democratic presidential nominee
- Henry Cabot Lodge (1850–1924) – U.S. senator from Massachusetts, led the Senate opposition to the League of Nations
- Henry Cabot Lodge Jr. (1902–1985) – U.S. senator from Massachusetts; 1960 Republican vice-presidential nominee
- Ed Markey (born 1946) – U.S. senator from Massachusetts (incumbent) and former congressman
- Warren Rudman (1930–2012) – U.S. senator from New Hampshire (born in Boston)
- Leverett Saltonstall (1892–1979) – U.S. senator (Minority Whip) and 55th governor of Massachusetts
- Theodore Sedgwick (1746–1813) – U.S. senator from Massachusetts (president pro tempore of the Senate) and speaker of the U.S. House of Representatives
- Roger Sherman (1721–1793) – U.S. senator from Connecticut and delegate to Continental Congress; signer of Declaration of Independence, Articles of Confederation, and U.S. Constitution (born in Newton, Massachusetts)
- Charles Sumner (1811–1874) – U.S. senator from Massachusetts; notable leader of the Radical Republicans
- John E. Sununu (born 1964) – U.S. senator from New Hampshire (born in Boston)
- Paul Tsongas (1941–1997) – U.S. senator from Massachusetts and 1992 Democratic presidential candidate
- Elizabeth Warren (born 1949) – U.S. senator from Massachusetts (incumbent) and 2020 Democratic presidential candidate
- Daniel Webster (1782–1852) – U.S. senator and congressman from Massachusetts, and U.S. secretary of state
- Henry Wilson (1812–1875) – U.S. senator from Massachusetts

=== United States representatives ===
- Jake Auchincloss (born 1988) – current U.S. congressman for Massachusetts's 4th congressional district
- Katherine Clark (born 1963) – current U.S. congresswoman for Massachusetts's 5th congressional district
- Susan Davis (born 1944) – U.S. congresswoman from California (born in Cambridge, Massachusetts)
- Bill Keating (born 1952) – current U.S. congressman for Massachusetts's 9th congressional district
- Joseph P. Kennedy II (born 1952) – U.S. congressman from Massachusetts
- Joseph P. Kennedy III (born 1980) – U.S. congressman from Massachusetts
- Patrick J. Kennedy (born 1967) – U.S. congressman from Rhode Island (born in Brighton, Massachusetts)
- Stephen Lynch (born 1955) – current U.S. congressman for Massachusetts's 8th congressional district
- John W. McCormack (1891–1980) – longtime U.S. congressman from Massachusetts and Speaker of the United States House of Representatives
- Jim McGovern (born 1959) – current U.S. congressman for Massachusetts's 2nd congressional district
- Seth Moulton (born 1978) – current U.S. congressman for Massachusetts's 6th congressional district
- Richard Neal (born 1949) – current U.S. congressman for Massachusetts's 1st congressional district
- Tip O'Neill (1912–1994) – longtime U.S. congressman from Massachusetts and speaker of the United States House of Representatives
- Ayanna Pressley (born 1974) – current U.S. congresswoman for Massachusetts's 7th congressional district
- Lori Trahan (born 1973) – current U.S. congresswoman for Massachusetts's 3rd congressional district

=== Other politicians and government figures ===
- Joe Arpaio (born 1932) – sheriff of Maricopa County, Arizona (born in Springfield, Massachusetts)
- William M. Bulger (born 1934) – former president of the Massachusetts State Senate and former president of the University of Massachusetts
- Andrew Card (born 1947) – Massachusetts state legislator, U.S. secretary of transportation, White House Chief of Staff
- P.J. Crowley (born 1951) – assistant secretary of state for Public Affairs under President Obama
- Bill de Blasio (born 1961) – 109th mayor of New York City (raised in Cambridge, Massachusetts)
- William P. Doyle – commissioner of the Federal Maritime Commission (born in Boston, raised in Weymouth)
- Thomas Finneran (born 1950) – speaker of the Massachusetts House of Representatives
- John F. Fitzgerald (1863–1950) – U.S. congressman from Massachusetts, 38th and 40th mayor of Boston; maternal grandfather of President John F. Kennedy
- Richard Goodwin (1931–2018) – speechwriter for John F. Kennedy, Lyndon B. Johnson, and Robert F. Kennedy; congressional investigator
- Nathaniel Gorham (1738–1796) – Massachusetts delegate and 6th president of the Continental Congress
- Tim Hickey (born 1938) – deputy state treasurer of Massachusetts
- Kim Janey (born 1965) – acting mayor of Boston
- John F. Kelly (born 1950) – U.S. secretary of Homeland Security under President Donald Trump
- Jean Kennedy Smith (1928– 2020) – U.S. ambassador to Ireland
- P. J. Kennedy (1858–1929) – member of the Massachusetts state legislature
- Harold Hongju Koh (born 1954) – legal adviser of the Department of State under President Obama
- Gina McCarthy (born 1954) – EPA administrator under President Obama
- Thomas Menino (1942–2014) – longest-serving mayor of Boston
- Ernest Moniz (born 1944) – U.S. secretary of energy under President Obama
- Peter R. Orszag (born 1968) – director of the Office of Management and Budget under President Obama
- Frances Perkins (1880–1965) – U.S. secretary of labor (1933–1945); first woman appointed to the U.S. Cabinet
- Timothy Pickering (1745–1829) – U.S. secretary of state, Massachusetts politician, soldier in Continental Army in the American Revolution
- Cass Sunstein (born 1954) – administrator of the White House Office of Information and Regulatory Affairs under President Obama
- Marty Walsh (born 1967) – 54th mayor of Boston and current United States Secretary of Labor

=== First Ladies ===
- Abigail Adams (1744–1818) – First Lady of the United States

== Lawyers and jurists ==
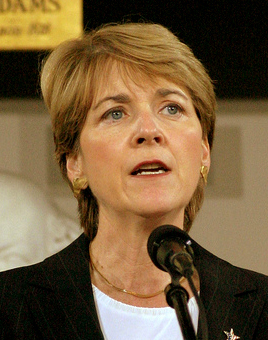
Martha Coakley

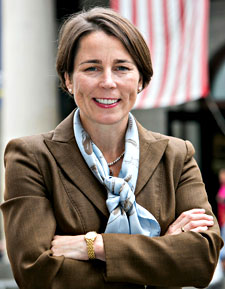
Maura Healey

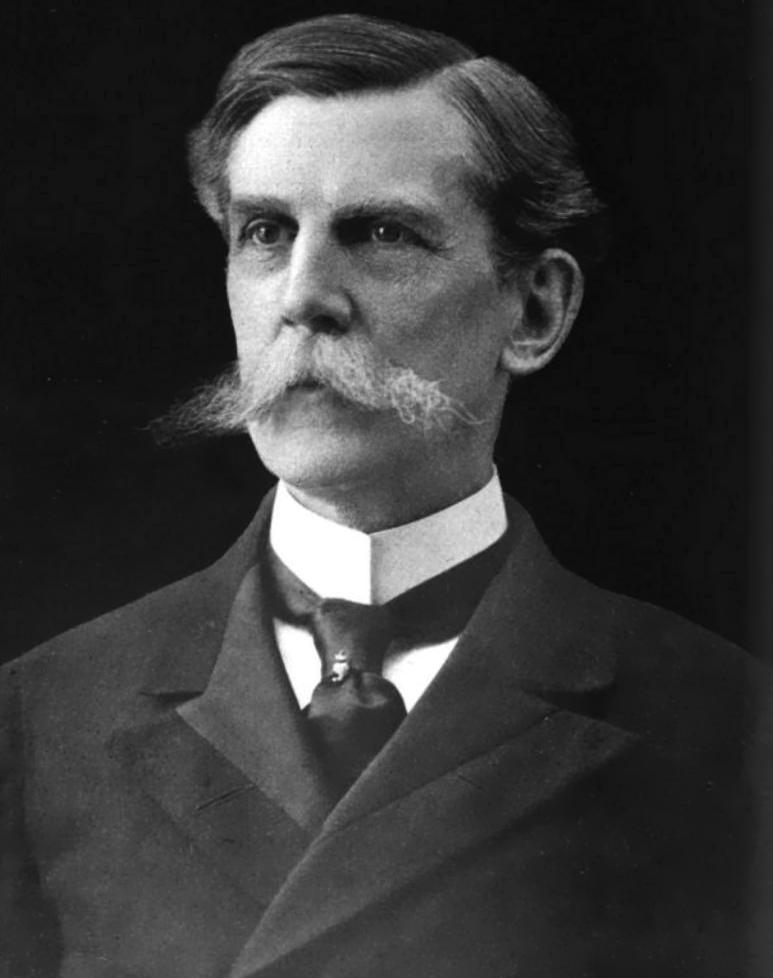
Oliver Wendell Holmes Jr.

- F. Lee Bailey – criminal defense attorney; involved in highly publicized trials such as the O. J. Simpson murder case, the Patty Hearst trial, and the Sam Sheppard case
- Andrea Campbell – Massachusetts attorney general
- Martha Coakley – former Massachusetts attorney general, U.S Senate candidate
- Caleb Cushing – former U.S. attorney general
- William Cushing – one of the original associate justices of the U.S. Supreme Court
- Charles Devens – former U.S. attorney general, Union Army commander in the Civil War
- Charles Garry − civil rights attorney
- Horace Gray – former associate justice of the U.S. Supreme Court; chief justice of Massachusetts Supreme Court
- Maura Healey – former Massachusetts attorney general
- Oliver Wendell Holmes Jr. – former associate justice of the U.S. Supreme Court; chief justice of Massachusetts Supreme Court; known for "clear and present danger" opinion in Schenck v. United States
- Roderick L. Ireland – first African American chief justice of the Massachusetts Supreme Judicial Court
- Michael LeMoyne Kennedy − lawyer, businessman, and political activist in Massachusetts
- Robert F. Kennedy Jr. – environmental lawyer and U.S. secretary of Health and Human Services
- David Kris – assistant attorney general under President Obama
- Margaret H. Marshall – chief justice of the Massachusetts Supreme Judicial Court (authored landmark 2003 Goodridge v. Department of Public Health decision)
- William Henry Moody – former associate justice of the U.S. Supreme Court; U.S. attorney general; U.S. secretary of the Navy
- James Otis Jr. – lawyer; known for his catchphrase "No taxation without representation"
- Theophilus Parsons – constitutional scholar; chief justice of the Massachusetts Supreme Judicial Court
- Irving Picard – attorney in the Madoff scandal
- Josiah Quincy II – Boston lawyer
- Elliot Richardson – U.S. attorney general during Nixon administration; former Massachusetts attorney general
- Lemuel Shaw – chief justice of the Massachusetts Supreme Judicial Court
- Joseph Story – former associate justice of the U.S. Supreme Court
- Webster Thayer – justice on the Massachusetts Superior Court, best known for Sacco and Vanzetti trial
- Kathleen Kennedy Townsend – attorney and former lieutenant governor of Maryland

== Religion ==
- Richard Alpert (Ram Dass) – spiritual teacher
- Alice Blanchard Coleman – missionary society leader
- Russell Conwell – Baptist minister, orator, philanthropist, lawyer, and writer
- Mary Dyer – martyr
- Mary Baker Eddy – founder of Christian Science
- Louis Farrakhan – Nation of Islam leader
- Mary H. Graves – Unitarian minister, literary editor, writer
- Edward Everett Hale – religious leader
- John Harvard – clergyman and namesake of Harvard University
- Martha Hooper Blackler Kalopothakes – missionary, journalist, translator
- Bernard Francis Law – archbishop and cardinal
- Emmanuel Lemelson – Greek Orthodox priest, investor and philanthropist
- Cotton Mather – minister
- Increase Mather – minister
- Dwight Lyman Moody – evangelist, founder of the Northfield Mount Hermon School
- Edmund Sears – Unitarian parish minister who wrote "It Came upon the Midnight Clear" in 1849
- Samuel Webber – clergyman, mathematician, and academic

== Science, engineering, and medicine ==
=== A–E ===
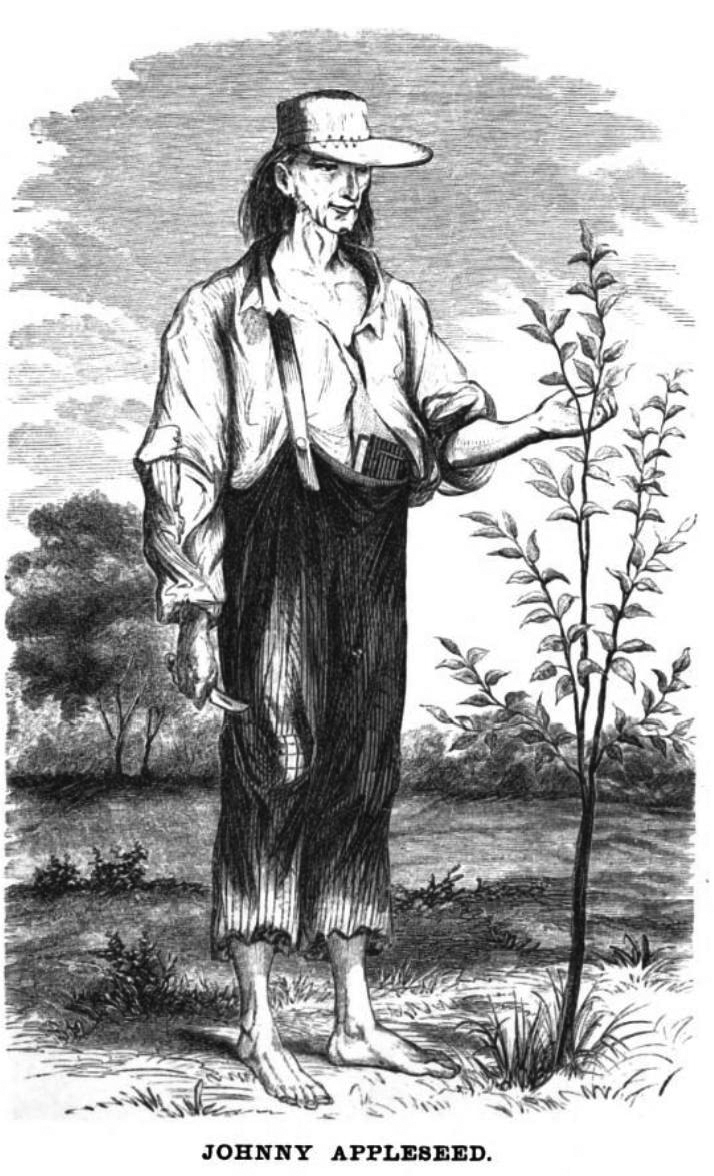
Johnny Appleseed

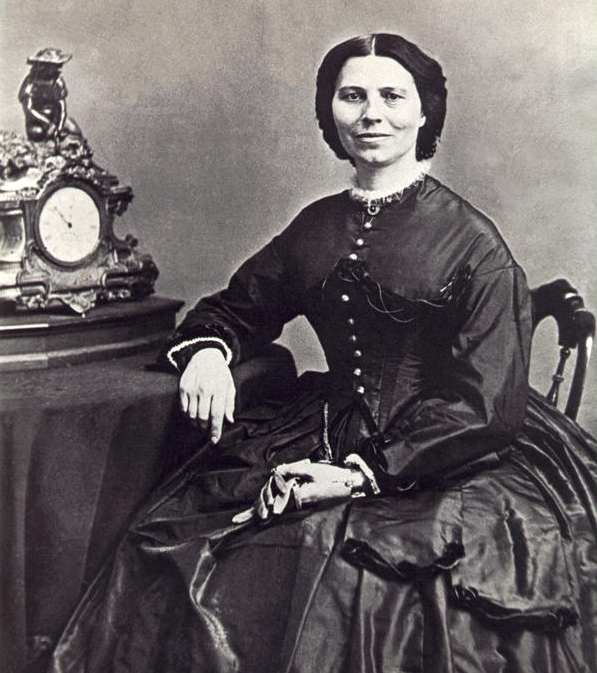
Clara Barton

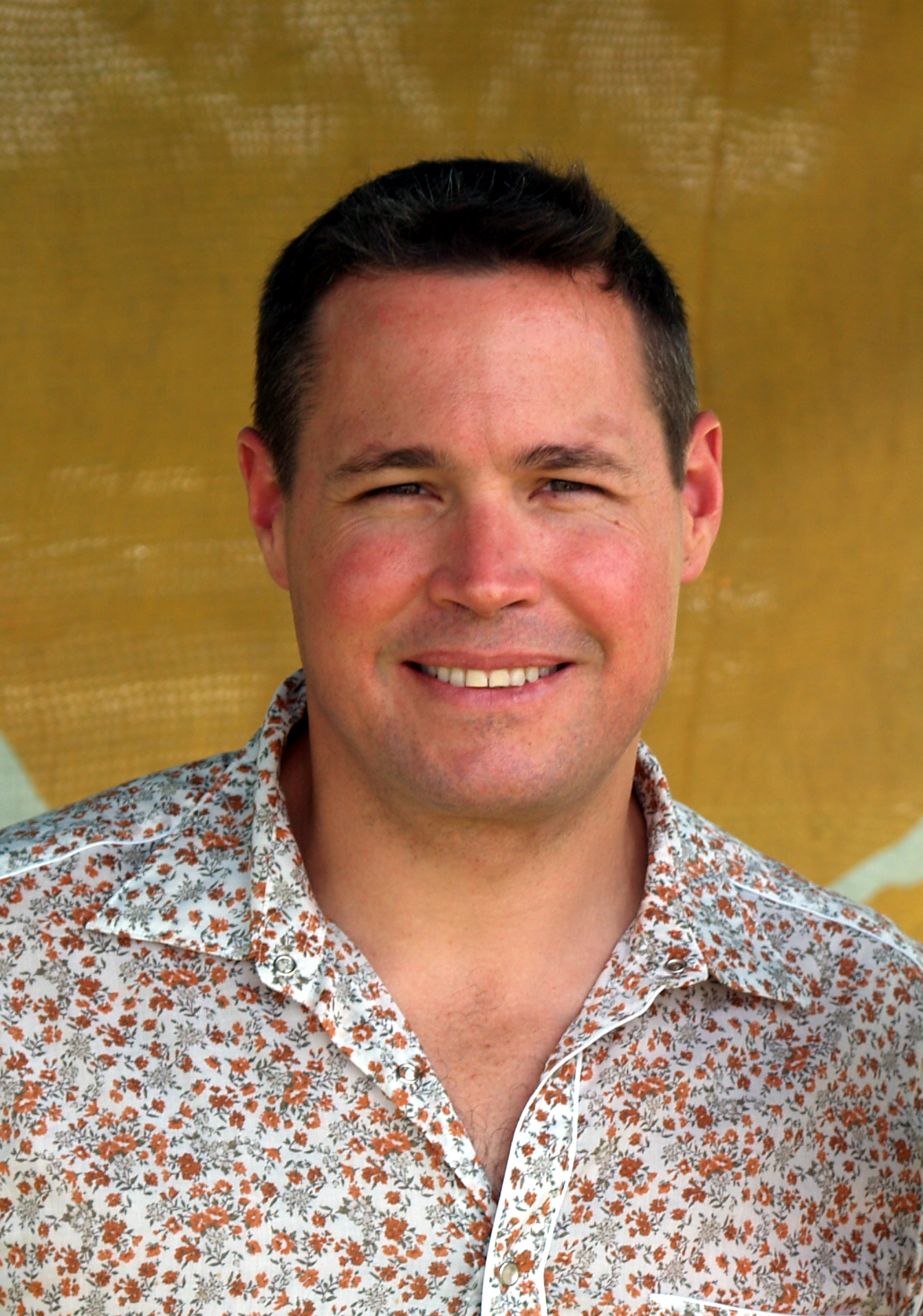
Jeff Corwin

- Cyrus Alger – metallurgist, arms manufacturer and inventor
- Ethan Allen – co-inventor of the single-action revolver
- Johnny Appleseed – pioneer nurseryman
- Jerome Apt – astronaut
- Nima Arkani-Hamed – theoretical physicist
- Elliot Aronson – psychologist
- Charlotte Barnum – mathematician
- Clara Barton – nurse, founder of the American Red Cross
- Florence Bascom – geologist, first woman to graduate with a Ph.D. from Johns Hopkins, started geology department at Bryn Mawr
- Alexander Graham Bell – inventor
- Sir Tim Berners-Lee – World Wide Web; MIT professor
- Nathaniel Bowditch – mathematician
- Ephraim Wales Bull – cultivator of the Concord grape
- Luther Burbank – horticulturist
- William Burt – inventor, surveyor, and millwright
- Vannevar Bush – engineer, inventor and science administrator
- Rachel Fuller Brown – chemist
- Noam Chomsky – linguist
- Michael Cohen – first doctor to diagnose Proteus syndrome
- Morris Cohen – metallurgist
- William D. Coolidge – physicist
- Elias James Corey – chemist, Nobel Prize in Chemistry 1990
- Jeff Corwin – biologist, wildlife conservationist, and television personality
- William Healey Dall – naturalist, malacologist
- Daniel Dennett – cognitive scientist and philosopher

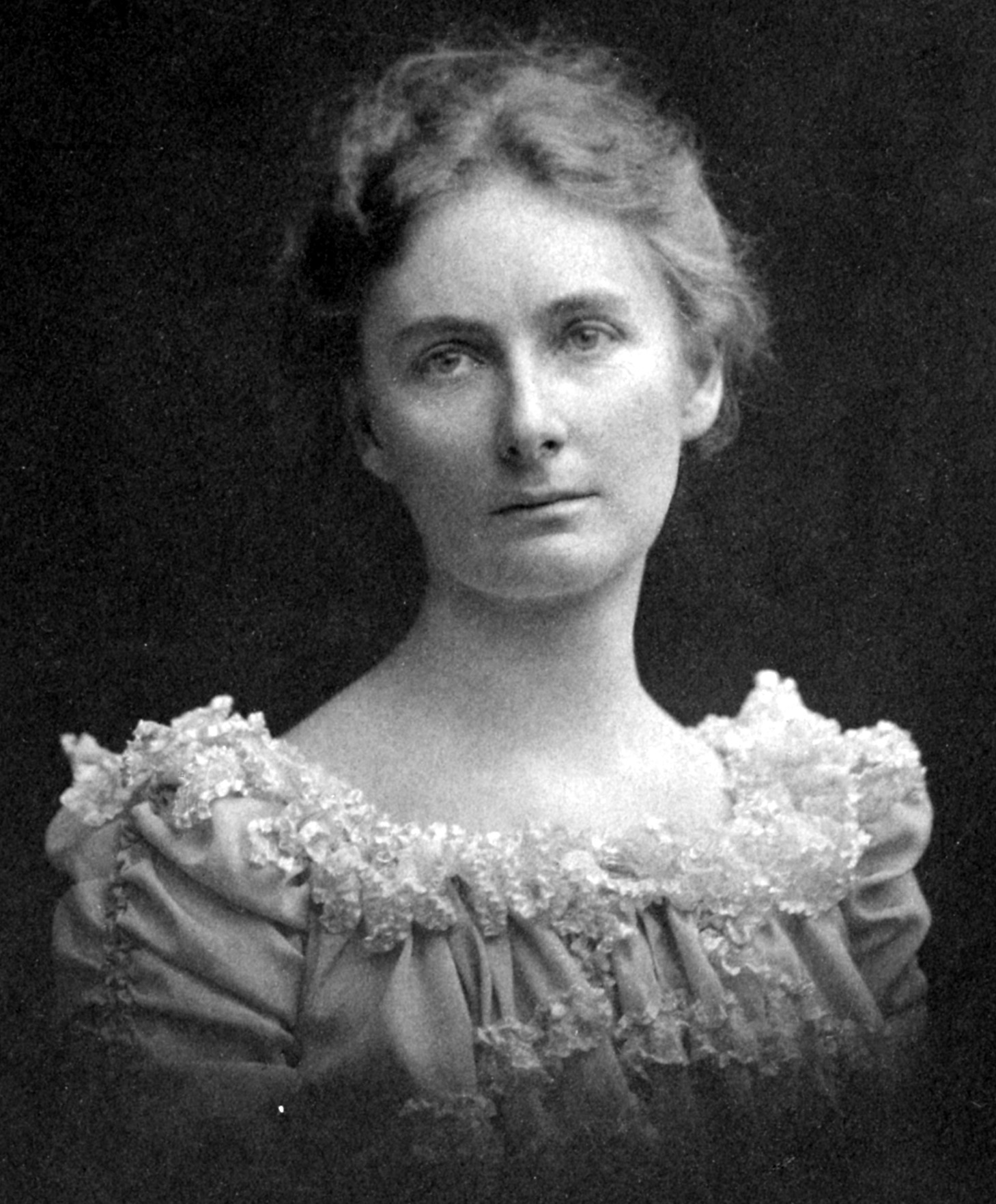
Florence Bascom

=== F–M ===
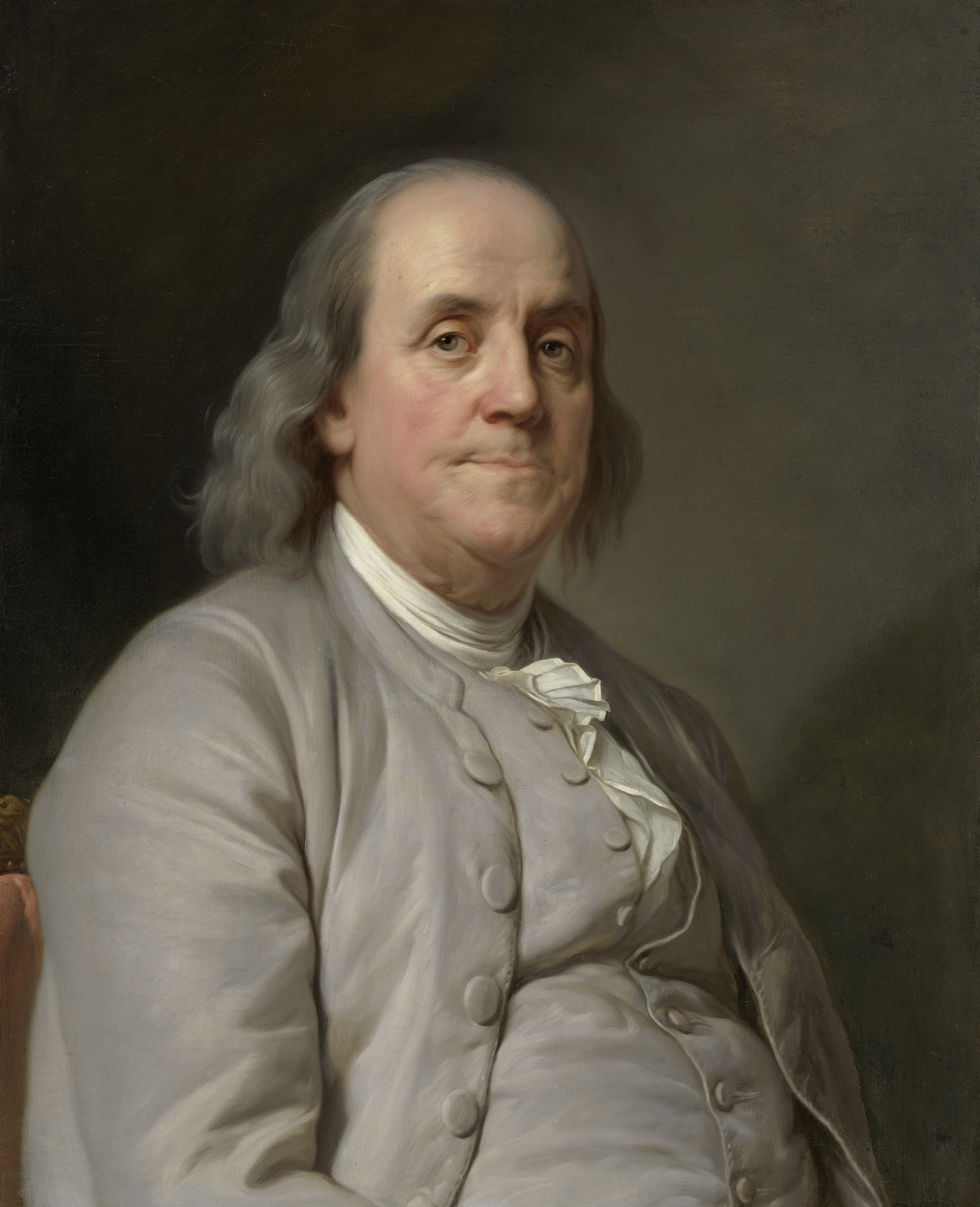
Benjamin Franklin

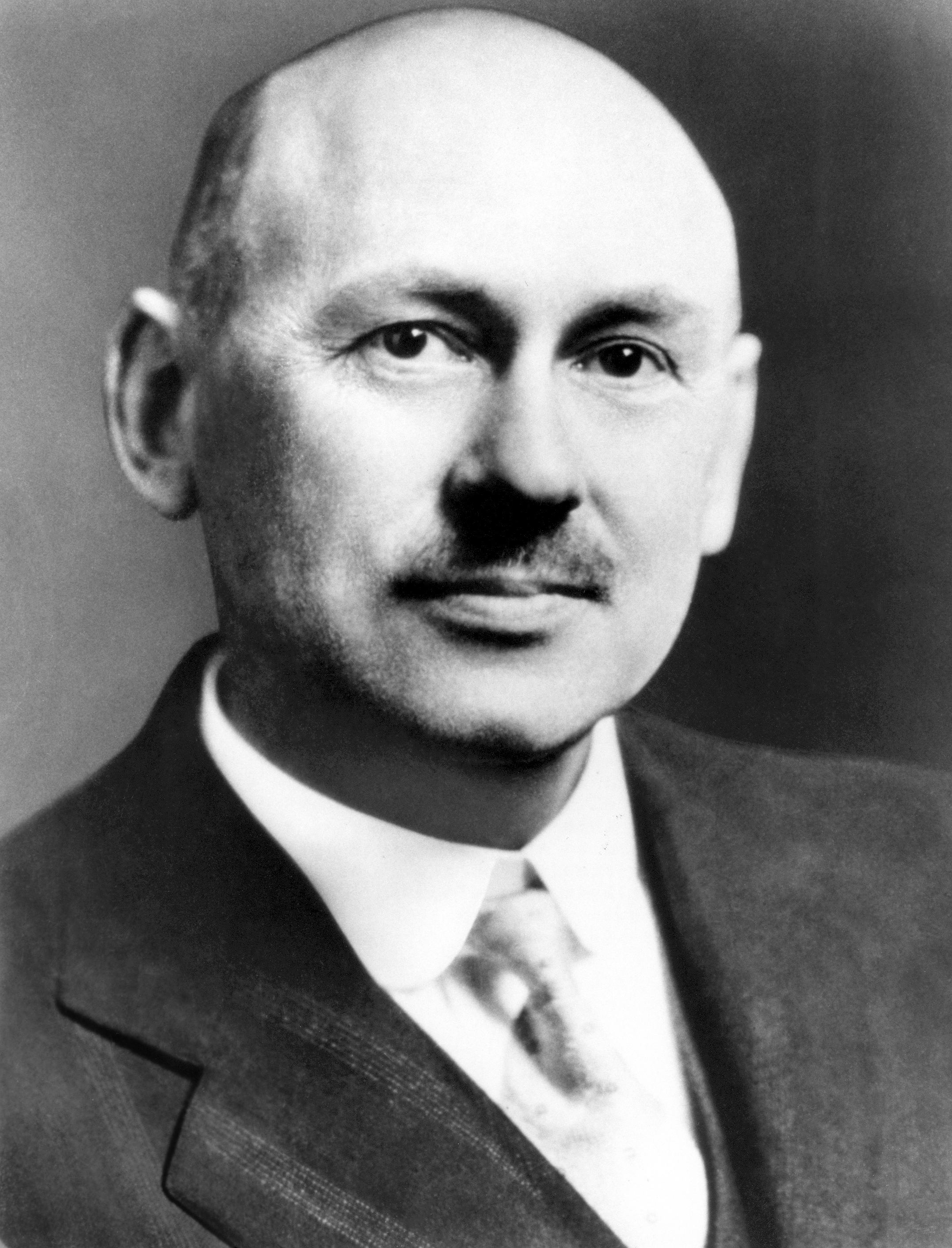
Robert Goddard

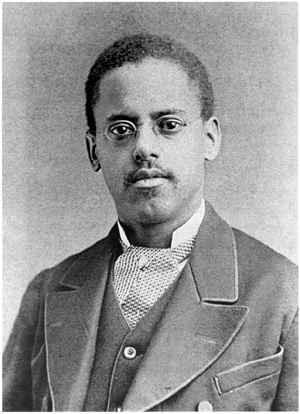
Lewis Howard Latimer

- Benjamin Franklin – scientist, diplomat, public official
- Seraph Frissell – physician, medical writer
- Buckminster Fuller – architect, systems theorist, author, designer, and inventor
- Robert Goddard – inventor
- Ward Goodenough – anthropologist
- Temple Grandin – doctor of animal science and professor at Colorado State University
- Sylvester Graham – inventor
- Crawford Greenewalt – chemical engineer
- Isaac Greenwood – mathematician
- Frederick Hauck – NASA astronaut
- Elias Howe – inventor
- Dan Itse – chemical engineer and New Hampshire public official
- Melvin Johnson – prominent firearms designer
- Richard Karp – computer scientist, computational theorist
- Alan Kay – computer scientist
- Nathaniel S. Keith – manufacturer, chemist, inventor, and electrical engineer
- Robert Lanza – medical doctor, scientist
- Lewis Howard Latimer – inventor and draftsman
- Erasmus Darwin Leavitt Jr. – mechanical engineer
- Henrietta Swan Leavitt – astronomer
- Gilbert N. Lewis – physical chemist, discovered covalent bonds
- Robert Lindsay – physicist, specializing in acoustics
- Richard Lindzen – atmospheric physicist
- Arthur Little – chemist and chemical engineer
- Percival Lowell – astronomer
- Elizabeth Marston – psychologist, co-creator of Wonder Woman
- William Marston – psychologist, co-creator of Wonder Woman
- John McCarthy – computer scientist, cognitive scientist
- Barbara McInnis – public health nurse, tuberculosis specialist, teacher, and innovator who dedicated her life to providing health care to homeless people
- Albert Abraham Michelson – physicist, first American to receive the Nobel Prize in science
- Maria Mitchell – first U.S. female astronomer
- Samuel Morse – painter, co-developer of Morse code
- William T.G. Morton – dentist and physician
- Richard Muther – industrial engineer

=== N–Z ===
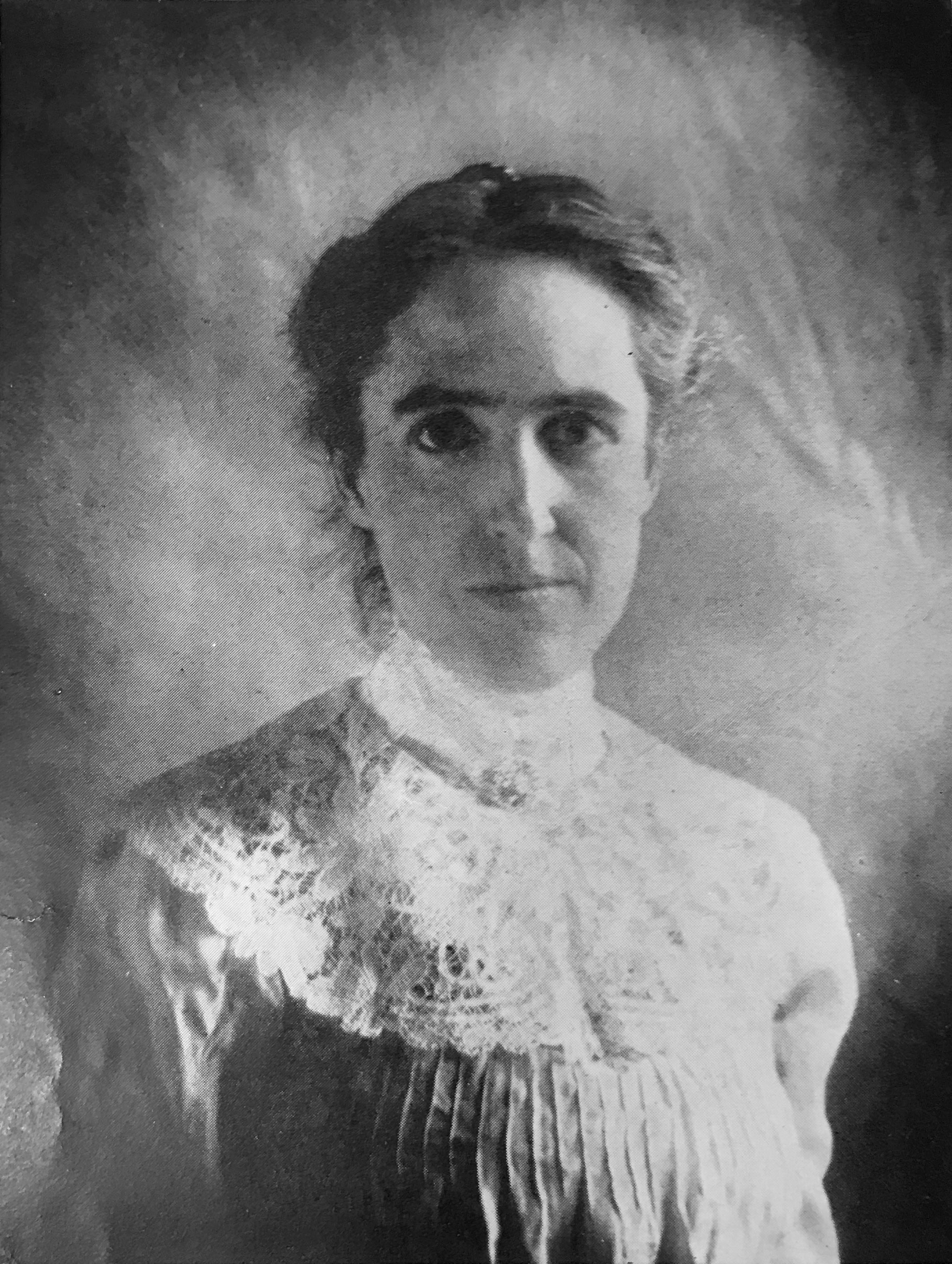
Henrietta Swan Leavitt

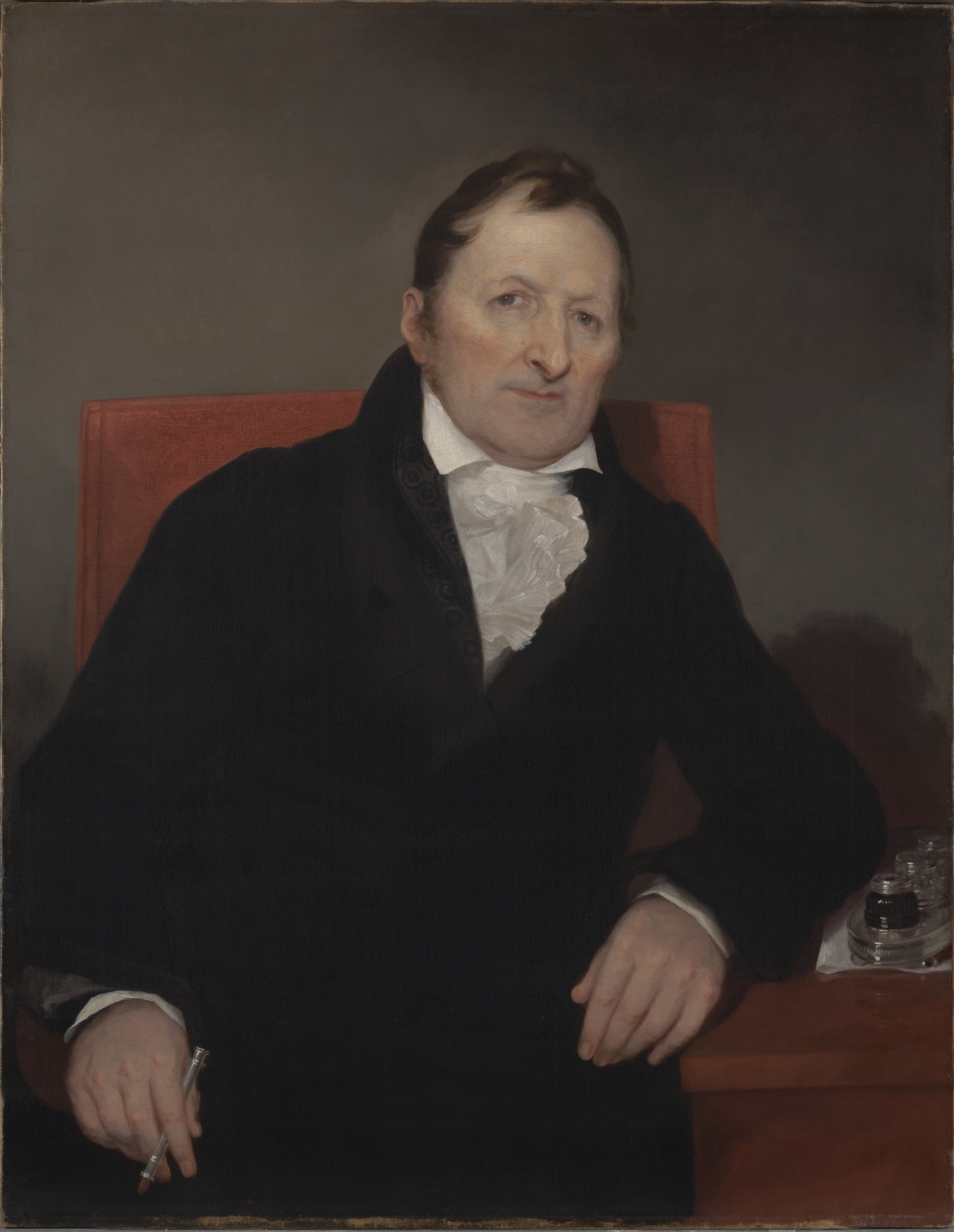
Eli Whitney

- Lloyd Ohlin – sociologist and criminologist
- Robert T. Paine – ecologist
- Charles Sanders Peirce – logician, mathematician, philosopher, and scientist
- Jacob Perkins – inventor, mechanical engineer and physicist
- Gregory Pincus – scientist, developed birth control pill
- Rufus Porter – inventor
- Cornelius Rhoads – pathologist and oncologist
- Albert Sacco – chemical engineer and payload specialist for NASA
- John Henry Schwarz – theoretical physicist
- Samuel Scudder – entomologist and palaeontologist
- Andrew Strominger – theoretical physicist
- Benjamin Thompson – physicist and inventor
- Edward Thorndike – psychologist
- Janice E. Voss – engineer, NASA astronaut
- An Wang – inventor, computer engineer, co-founder of Wang Laboratories
- Worcester Warner – mechanical engineer, astronomer
- Samuel Wellman – inventor of the crucible steel furnace
- David Ames Wells – engineer, textbook author, economist
- Daniel Wesson – firearms designer
- Charles Abiathar White – geologist, paleontologist
- Frank C. Whitmore – chemist
- Eli Whitney – inventor
- Kenneth G. Wilson – theoretical physicist
- John Winthrop – mathematician, physicist, astronomer
- Robert Wood – physicist, inventor
- Sewall Wright – geneticist

== Others ==
- Henry Adams – historian
- Jane Kelley Adams – educator
- Bhumibol Adulyadej – King of Thailand
- Lillian Asplund – last survivor of the RMS Titanic who remembered the actual sinking
- Sarah Lord Bailey – elocutionist and teacher
- E. Florence Barker – activist
- Kingman Brewster Jr. (1919–1988) – president of Yale University and ambassador
- Eva Maria Brown – reformer, activist, legal writer
- Julia Knowlton Dyer – philanthropist
- Susan Fessenden – activist, reformer
- Kevin Hassett – economist, specializing in macroeconomics and tax policy
- Sarah S. Jacobs – writer and chief record clerk in Cambridge
- John Kneller – English-American professor and fifth president of Brooklyn College
- Jill Lepore – historian
- Corey Lewandowski – campaign manager for Donald Trump's 2016 presidential campaign
- Carroll Quigley – historian and theorist of the evolution of civilizations
- Acharya S – internet personality, conspiracy theorist
- Mary Sawyer Tyler – believed to be the real-life subject of the nursery rhyme "Mary Had a Little Lamb"
- Monroe and Isabel Smith – co-founders of American Youth Hostels
- Howland Wood – numismatist and author

== See also ==
- Lists of Americans
- List of Massachusetts suffragists
- List of people from Boston
- List of people from Concord, Massachusetts
- List of people from Holyoke, Massachusetts
- List of people from Worcester, Massachusetts
