= New England Woman's Press Association =

American women's journalism organization

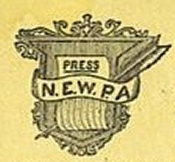
NEWPA logo circa 1901.

The New England Woman's Press Association (NEWPA) was founded by six Boston newspaper women in 1885 and incorporated in 1890. By the turn of the century it had over 150 members. NEWPA sought not only to bring female colleagues together and further their careers in a male-dominated field, but to use the power of the press for the good of society. The group raised funds for charity and supported women's suffrage and other political causes.

NEWPA was a charter member of both the General Federation of Women's Clubs and the National Federation of Press Women, among other organizations. Notable members included Lucy Stone, Julia Ward Howe, and Josephine St. Pierre Ruffin. Its last meeting was held in 1982.

== History ==
=== Founding ===
In November 1885, Marion A. McBride of the Boston Post sent out a call to other Boston newspaper women to establish a press association. (Note: Also spelled "MacBride"; see Lord (1932), p. 9.) McBride had already been involved in the founding of the Illinois Woman's Press Association and the National Woman's Press Association. Boston was a logical choice for another such group. With 9 daily newspapers and 19 weeklies, it was one of the busiest media centers in the country, but few of its newspapers hired women full time. Most women in the field worked as part-time correspondents and contributors. Their professional opportunities were limited, and they were often treated disrespectfully by their male colleagues.

On November 17, six women met at the office of Boston Herald reporter Sallie Joy White and formed the New England Woman's Press Association (NEWPA). Besides McBride and White, the other women were Helen M. Winslow of the Boston Daily Advertiser, Grace W. Soper of the Boston Daily Journal, Estelle M. Hatch (later Estelle M. H. Merrill) of the Boston Globe, and freelance journalist Cora Stuart Wheeler. White was chosen to be the first president and Hatch the first secretary.

The group met at the headquarters of the Woman's Journal until it outgrew that space and moved to the Parker House Hotel.

=== Mission and membership ===
Over the next year, Hatch recruited a dozen more women to the organization. Alice Stone Blackwell of the Woman's Journal headed a committee that drew up a constitution and bylaws. To make clear that NEWPA was a professional association and not a social club, membership was limited to women living in New England who were "regularly and professionally connected with the press of New England, either as writers, editors, business managers, or correspondents—all, in short, for whom work on the press is a vocation, and not an avocation, a breadwinning occupation, and not an amusement." The group was incorporated on September 15, 1890. Starting in 1891, associate members were admitted, but not allowed to vote.

Most of NEWPA's members were from the Boston area; others hailed from Maine, New Hampshire, Rhode Island, Vermont, and Nova Scotia. They included proprietors of local newspapers such as the Winthrop Visitor, editors of household, fashion, society, art, and literature departments, and freelance journalists who contributed to many different newspapers and magazines. Lillian A. Lewis, the first African-American woman reporter in Boston, made national headlines when she was admitted to the association in 1889. In the 1920s, NEWPA began accepting radio script writers, public relations writers, playwrights, and other "kindred women writers." The association maintained an average of more than 120 members until the mid-1940s.

NEWPA's constitution served as a model for many other women's press organizations over the next twenty years; for example, the Pacific Coast Woman's Press Association, founded in 1890, modeled its constitution after NEWPA's, and went on to become a leader of the women's movement in California. NEWPA's object was "to promote acquaintance and good-fellowship among newspaper women" and to use the power of the press to promote "good objects in social, philanthropic, and reformatory lines." In other words, it was a professional association, but one that aimed to make a positive difference in the community. As such, it was part of the women's club movement. It became a charter member of the General Federation of Women's Clubs in 1890; the International Federation of Women's Press Clubs in 1891; the Massachusetts Federation of Women's Clubs in 1895; and the National Federation of Press Women in 1938.

=== Social and professional activities ===
For the first few years, NEWPA held literary and business meetings twice a month, elections each November, and an outing each spring. They invited prominent authors and newspaper women such as Jane Cunningham Croly, Amelia Edwards, and Frances H. Burnett to speak about their work. Each February, male friends and relatives of members were invited to a "Gentlemen's Night" at the Hotel Vendome, featuring guest speakers such as Mayor Josiah Quincy. One member wrote in 1901, "However busy a newspaper woman may be the rest of the year, on gentlemen's night she lays aside all care, puts on her most becoming gown, and consigns to oblivion assignments, hurry calls for copy, and all the rest of the daily routine." They also hosted special events, such as authors' readings, teas, and receptions. During World War I the association began holding fewer social events, but continued holding monthly business and literary meetings.

NEWPA established the Woman's Press Bureau in 1888 to help members find work. On February 11, 1894, they called attention to the work of women journalists by publishing a special "women's edition" of the Boston Post, "written, edited, and put out entirely by women." In the 1930s and 40s, NEWPA regularly broadcast shows on WEEI and WORL. Starting in the 1930s they also published a monthly bulletin. Annual workshops offered expertise on such topics as "Writing a Feature Column" and "Editing Winter Sports."

In 1946 NEWPA established an annual awards competition, with several categories such as news story, feature story, and "article or column of special interest to women." The New England Newspaper Woman of the Year award was added in 1951; recipients included Catherine Coyne of the Boston Herald, Mary Crewmen of the Boston Globe, and Mary Handy of the Christian Science Monitor.

=== Charitable and reform efforts ===
In its early years, NEWPA was active in community affairs and politics. On January 18, 1887, the same day its constitution and bylaws were adopted, the group was addressed by "Mme. Charpiot," superintendent of the Home for Intemperate Women, who spoke of the need for matrons at Boston's police stations. Marion McBride had first spoken to Ms. Charpiot about this issue in 1886. She recalled later:

I told her I had determined to take it up and not lay it down until we had police matrons, not only for the city, but for the State as well. I went to police headquarters and got from the books the numbers of women arrested in 1885 and other facts and figures which I sent out at once to the leading papers in the State and to papers in Chicago, St. Louis, San Francisco and New Orleans.

In February, the "lady newspaper men" of NEWPA voted to show their support for the movement by signing a petition to the state legislature. A few days later, a short article in the Boston Globe reminded readers of the need for police matrons, and encouraged activists to keep the pressure on city and state officials. NEWPA's reporters and editors continued to call the public's attention to the issue over the next few months. By early May the legislature had passed a bill to appoint police matrons in Massachusetts cities and establish a house of detention for women in Boston. McBride attributed the success of the movement to the "kindness and courage" of the Boston press.

The association campaigned for international copyright laws in 1889, and for "clean journalism" at the turn of the century. During the Panic of 1893 it formed a benevolent society, "Samaritania," which raised money for the poor and established a fund for journalists in need. They organized authors' readings, auctions, and other fundraising events, and sponsored a hospital bed for women writers at Lynn Hospital. In 1914, NEWPA marched in the Boston suffrage parade, and in 1919 Dr. Grace E. Cross represented NEWPA at the National Woman's Party demonstration in Washington, D.C.

NEWPA was far less politically active during the "women's liberation" movement of the 1960s and 70s. The association took no formal position on the Equal Rights Amendment, for example, issued no petitions, and sent no representatives to demonstrations. One former president, Muriel Knight, said members were too busy to devote much time to activism, while another, Evelena Hudson, attributed the change to conservative leadership.

=== Later years ===
Membership declined over the years due to competition from other groups such as the Society of Professional Journalists (SPJ), American Women in Radio & Television (AWRT), and Women in Communications, Inc. (WICI). In an attempt to attract new members, NEWPA began admitting men in the early 1970s. Attendance continued to decline, and fewer meetings were held. The association held its last annual meeting in 1982.

== Presidents ==
- Sallie Joy White, 1885-1890
- Estelle M. Hatch, 1891-1893
- Helen M. Winslow, 1894-1895
- May Alden Ward, 1896-1897
- Elizabeth Merritt Gosse, 1898
- Nella I. Daggett, 1899-1900
- Annie G. Murray, 1901-1902
- Emeline Carr Ricker, 1903-1904
- Allie A. Whitaker, 1905
- Kate Tannatt Woods, 1906
- Sallie Joy White, 1907-1908
- Eleanor W. F. Bates, 1908 (interim)
- Bessie Brown Cobb, 1908-1910
- Ida May Pierce, 1911-1912
- Myra B. Lord, 1913-15
- M. Agnes Dalrymple Bishop, 1916
- Grace M. Burt, 1917-1918
- Rose Moore Strong, 1919-1920
- Jessie L. Leonard, 1921-1922
- Annie Judson Hannigan, 1923-1924
- Norah Johnson Barbour, 1925-1926
- Helena B. Shipman, 1927-1928
- Helena C. Mahoney, 1929-1930
- Mildred Buchanan Flagg, 1931
- Muriel Knight, 1972-1973
- Evelena Hudson, 1973-1974

== Notable members ==
- Martha Violet Ball (1811–1894), charter member
- Anna Barrows (1861-1948), home economics expert
- Isabel Barrows (1845-1913), ophthalmologist
- Cynthia Holmes Belcher (1827-1911), journalist
- Mary Agnes Dalrymple Bishop (1857–1934), Executive Committee
- Alice Stone Blackwell (1857-1950), feminist, suffragist
- Mary Elizabeth Blake (1840-1907), poet
- Mabel Louise Blodgett (1869-1959), novelist, children's book author
- Helen A. Clarke (1860-1926), literary critic and editor
- Katherine E. Conway (1853-1927), editor of the Pilot
- Mary Catherine Crowley (1856-1920), Catholic and children's writer
- Ellen B. Dietrick (1847-1895), suffragist and author
- Mildred Buchanan Flagg (1886-1980), writer, lecturer, and clubwoman
- Sarah E. Fuller (1838-1913), philanthropist and social leader
- Lavinia Stella Goodwin (1833-1911), charter member
- Kate E. Griswold (born ca. 1869), publisher of Profitable Advertising
- Louise Imogen Guiney (1861-1920), poet
- Estelle M. Hatch (1858-1908), NEWPA co-founder and second president
- Julia Ward Howe (1819-1910), author and activist
- Eunice D. Kinney (1851-1942), Canadian-born American physician; journal editor
- Muriel Knight (?-2009), WILD reporter, first African-American president of NEWPA
- Lillian A. Lewis (1861-?), Boston's first African-American woman journalist
- Mary J. Lincoln (1844-1921), cooking teacher, cookbook author
- Marion A. McBride (1850-1909), co-founder of three press associations
- Louise Chandler Moulton (1835-1908), poet
- Grace Atkinson Oliver (1844-1899), author, advocate of women's rights
- Annie Stevens Perkins (1868-1946), writer
- Charlotte Porter (1857-1942), literary critic and editor
- Ella Farman Pratt (1837–1907), editor of Wide Awake
- Josephine St. Pierre Ruffin (1842-1924), civil rights leader and suffragist
- Emily McGary Selinger (1848–1927), painter, writer, poet, educator
- Harriette Lucy Robinson Shattuck (1850-1937), author, writer on parliamentary law, suffragist
- Lucy Stone (1818-1893), abolitionist and women's rights activist
- Evelyn Greenleaf Sutherland (1855-1908), drama critic and playwright
- Clara Augusta Jones Trask (1839-1905), freelance writer, novelist
- Kate Vannah (1855-1933), journalist, songwriter
- Adelaide Cilley Waldron (1843-1909), author, editor, clubwoman
- May Alden Ward (1853-1918), author, lecturer, clubwoman
- Emily Greene Wetherbee (1839-1937), journalist, schoolteacher, and poet
- Cora Stuart Wheeler (1852-1897) poet, art critic
- Sallie Joy White (1847-1909), first full-time woman reporter for a Boston newspaper
- Sibyl Wilbur (1871-1946), journalist and biographer
- S. Fannie Gerry Wilder (1850-1923), author
- Helen M. Winslow (1851-1938), journalist, poet, novelist
- Kate Tannatt Woods (1836-1910), author, editor, journalist, clubwoman
