= Sallie Joy White =

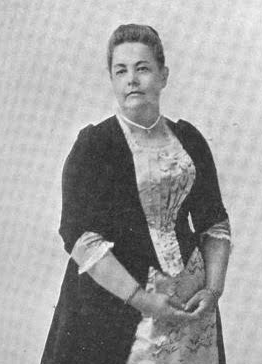
- Born: Sarah Elizabeth Joy; 1847; Brattleboro, Vermont, U.S.
- Died: March 25, 1909 (aged 61–62); Dedham, Massachusetts, U.S.
- Known for: Journalism
- Spouse(s): Henry K. White, Jr.
- Children: 2

Sallie Joy White (1847-1909) was an American journalist. In 1870 she became the first woman staff reporter on a Boston newspaper when she was hired by the Boston Post, and she continued to write for local newspapers until her death in 1909. She co-founded the New England Woman's Press Association, and was an officer in several national press groups.

White was a strong supporter of women's suffrage and women's education. In addition to her regular work as a journalist, she wrote and lectured on the subject of career paths for women. Having had a valuable mentor in suffragist Mary A. Livermore, she in turn mentored countless younger women over the course of her long career.

== Early life and education ==
Sarah Elizabeth "Sallie" Joy was born in Brattleboro, Vermont, in 1847, the only child of Samuel and Rhoda Joy. She attended the Glenwood School for Girls. While still a teenager, she began publishing articles, poems, and short stories in local newspapers and journals, sometimes using the pen name "Flora Forrest." After graduation she moved to Charlestown, Massachusetts (now part of Boston), where she lived with family friends.

== Career ==
She worked for some time as a schoolteacher before being hired as an assistant for the Loring Circulating Library. The Loring was a gathering place for authors and intellectuals at the time, and it was there that she met two women who became her mentors: a magazine editor named Mrs. Bingham, and the suffragist Mary A. Livermore. During this period she continued to publish articles in New England newspapers and journals.

In the winter of 1869, when her employer increased her hours without raising her pay, she wrote in a letter to her mother that she planned to leave that job as soon as she could find something else, adding, "I will not be bullied by any man."

=== Journalism ===
At Livermore's invitation, she went to work for the Woman's Journal in 1870. That was to be a temporary position, however, as Livermore and Bingham believed she would be more useful to the women's movement as a reporter for the mainstream press. Livermore introduced her to several editors, and in February she was hired by the Boston Post to cover the Woman Suffrage Convention in Vermont. She soon made a name for herself as "the bright particular star" of the convention. She was a fast and accurate reporter, and her writing style was engaging, with touches of wry humor.

That spring she traveled throughout New England reporting on the suffrage movement, and making news herself simply by being a woman reporter. One journalist, after describing her charming appearance and demeanor, declared that she had "made a reputation as a newspaper correspondent and reporter of which any man may be proud. And this is saying a great deal for a woman." The Post offered her a permanent position, making her the first woman staff reporter on a Boston newspaper. In 1871 and 1872 she wrote an acclaimed series for the Post on Boston's North End Mission. Meanwhile, she supplemented her income by publishing letters and articles in several other newspapers, such as the New York World.

She quit her job at the Post to get married in 1874, but soon returned to the workforce. During the late 1870s she wrote two women's columns for the Boston Sunday Times and another for the Detroit Free Press, as well as articles on a variety of topics for the Boston Daily Advertiser, the Boston Chronicle, and other papers. In the early 1880s, carving out her niche as a "woman's" writer, she took a home economics course so as to be able to write more knowledgeably on the subject. By 1885 she had secured a full-time position at the Boston Herald, where she remained for the next 21 years. Most of her work for the Herald appeared with no byline. From 1904 to 1906 she published a column under the pen name "Penelope Penfeather." (Historian Elizabeth Burt suggests that the "ludicrous" pen name may have contributed to earlier historians' failure to take White seriously.)

=== Club activities ===
During the 1870s White became secretary of the Middlesex County Suffrage Association. She was a founding member of the Daughters of Vermont and the Fortnightly Study Club of Dedham, and a member of the New England Women's Club.

In November 1885, White hosted a meeting at her office with five other Boston newspaper women, and together they founded the New England Woman's Press Association. White served as president for the first five years, and again from 1907 to 1908.

In 1889, she was involved in the founding of the General Federation of Women's Clubs. She was elected president of the International Federation of Women's Press Clubs in 1891. Also in 1891, after finishing her term as NEWPA president, she established the Boston Woman's Press Club, which restricted admission to women working on Boston newspapers. The following year she was elected vice president of the International League of Press Clubs, a mixed-sex group in which she was the only female officer. She also served several times as a delegate to the National Editorial Association.

=== Lecturing and authorship ===
As a nationally known woman journalist, she was often invited to speak on the subject of women in journalism. In 1891 she traveled to California to speak at a meeting of the Pacific Coast Woman's Press Association. At the Chicago World's Fair in 1893, she presented a paper on the role of women in the press. The same year, she traveled to St. Paul to speak at the convention of the International League of Press Clubs. Although more women were entering the field, they were still a minority, and White was surrounded by prominent male journalists. She wrote to her daughter afterwards, "I was the one woman to make a speech at the banquet, and was said to have made the best speech of the evening. When I tell you that Murat Halstead, Col. De Long, and two members of Congress made the other speeches, you may imagine that I felt proud."

White also wrote and contributed to books about various occupations open to women. After taking a home economics course in the 1880s, she wrote two books for women about housekeeping and cooking. She wrote the chapter on "Newspaper Women" in Frances Willard's Occupations for Women; two years later, she published her own book on the subject, Business Openings for Girls. She contributed a series of "letters to American girls" to George J. Bayles's 1905 book, American Women's Legal Status, with such titles as "Your Place in Life," "The Girl and the Professions," "The Architect and the Decorator," "The Private Secretary and the Library Worker," and "The Life of Home, the Ideal Life."

== Personal life ==
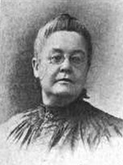
Sallie Joy White (1897)

She married musician Henry K. White, Jr. in 1874 and quit her job at the Post. The couple had two daughters, Bessie and Grace. In 1879, shortly after the birth of their second daughter, Henry moved to California, leaving Sallie to support herself and the children. Her widowed mother came to live with her and care for the children while she worked. White later dedicated her book, Housekeepers and Home-makers, to her mother, "the best housekeeper and the dearest home-maker I ever knew."

She died of anemia at her home in Dedham, Massachusetts, on March 25, 1909, after a long illness. Many of her newspaper colleagues attended her funeral service in Forest Hills, including several Boston Herald associates who served as pallbearers. Among those representing the New England Woman's Press Association were civil rights leader Josephine St. Pierre Ruffin and NEWPA co-founder Helen M. Winslow.

== Selected writings ==
- "The Working Girls: Necessity of a Business Preparation for Them". The Boston Herald. January 3, 1885.
- Housekeepers and Home-makers. Boston: Jordan Marsh & Company. 1888. "Sallie Joy White and Housekeepers and homemakers."
- Cookery in the Public Schools. Boston: D. Lothrop Company. 1890.
- Willard, Frances Elizabeth, ed. (1897). "Newspaper Women". Occupations for Women: A Book of Practical Suggestions for the Material Advancement, the Mental and Physical Development, and the Moral and Spiritual Uplift of Women. Success Company. pp. 283–292.
- Business Openings for Girls. New York: The Werner Company. 1899.
- Bayles, George James, ed. (1905). "Letters to American Girls". American Women's Legal Status. New York: P. F. Collier & Son. pp. 227–320.
