= Margaret Frances Sullivan =

Irish-American writer, journalist, editor

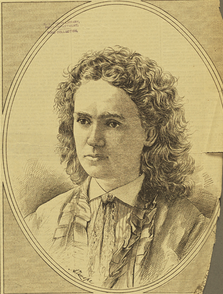
- Born: Margaret Frances Buchanan; 1847; Drumquin, County Tyrone, Ireland
- Died: December 28, 1903 (aged 55-56); Chicago, Illinois
- Resting place: Detroit, Michigan
- Education: Academy of the Sacred Heart
- Occupations: author, journalist, editor
- Spouse: Alexander Sullivan (m. 1874)
- Writing career
- Language: English

Margaret Frances Sullivan (1847 – December 28, 1903) was an Irish-born American author, journalist, and editor. She contributed to the principal American magazines, and her editorials, though unsigned, caused national comment. She was an editorial writer on Chicago daily newspapers and for journals in New York City and Boston; chief editorial writer for the Times-Herald, 1895; and editorial writer and art critic for the Chicago Chronicle, 1901.

One of her editorials was on the subject of why there were so few Democrats in the North. It was reproduced by politicians and, at the time of her death, was reprinted as a perfect example of political editorial writing. The Catholic World said, "She was ranked not with the distinguished women of the press but with the ablest men as Charles Anderson Dana of the New York Sun." Newspaper men who knew her admitted that she was, if not the greatest American editorial writer, at least the greatest that the city of Chicago had ever known.

Sullivan was sent to Paris, in 1889, as special cable correspondent of the Associated Press for the Universal Exposition. At its opening ceremony, she was the only writer to whom a seat was assigned in line with the French president, and the only representative of the press thus invited to assist at the ceremony. She was an authority on art, literature, science, politics, music and economics. Naturally gifted as she was, her remarkable power of concentration and the intense tenacity with which she applied herself made it easy for her to master any subject to which she devoted herself. Sullivan's Ireland of Today reached a sale of 30,000 copies. She co-authored Mexico, Picturesque, Political and Progressive with Mary Elizabeth McGrath Blake, of Boston.

== Early years and education ==
Margaret Frances Buchanan was born in Drumquin, County Tyrone, Ireland, 1847. She was the ninth child of James Buchanan and Susan Gorman. The father, who was a manufacturer in Ulster, Ireland, died in her infancy, and the family came to Detroit, Michigan in 1851, two of her siblings having settled there in the early part of the previous decade.

Here Sullivan received her education, first in the Academy of the Sacred Heart, run by Sisters of Charity and Religious of the Sacred Heart, where she studied the French language, which she later used to her advantage in her newspaper work, and afterwards in the Detroit public schools. The course she pursued was classical, Latin and Greek, with modern languages, music, drawing and physical sciences. A versatile scholar, she made a remarkable record at school. She never attended college but always continued to broaden her horizons and educate herself by reading and traveling.

== Career ==
=== Early career ===
After graduation, Buchanan became a principal at a public high school, in the Houghton school in Detroit. In 1870, she moved to Chicago to pursue a career in journalism. Her reception by the Chicago editors was anything but favorable. Her youth and sex, they told her frankly, were against her. It was some time, therefore, before she received a position on any of the Chicago dailies. During the time when she was without regular work, she wrote continuously, sending her stories to the various papers. Her manuscripts, as a rule, were accepted although the acceptances did not come with an offer for a staff position, the editors consistently refusing to take a woman on their papers. The first story of hers which was accepted was an account of the reception at Sacred Heart Convent, where she boarded during her first years in Chicago. She took the story to the offices of the Chicago Times and laid it on the desk of the managing editor. He picked it up, glanced at it and gave Sullivan US$5. A few days later, as she was walking down Madison Avenue, someone tapped her on the shoulder. It was the editor of the Times. "I am sorry, Miss Buchanan, that I did not read your article before I paid you. It was extremely well written and worth more than five dollars." At that, he handed her a US$10 bill. Sullivan was 20 years old at the time and bore a striking resemblance to Rosa Bonheur.

Because she was a stranger in the city and because of the rather secluded life she was forced to lead while a boarder at the convent, she found it practically impossible to do much as a reporter; instead, she began editorial work. Conversant with every phase of life, ancient and modern, she was especially fitted for such work. She wrote editorials on every conceivable subject, art, literature, science, education, economics and politics. Although the editors accepted her work, they still refused to give her a position. Finally, she went to Wilbur F. Storey, editor of the Times, and reminding him that he had never refused her editorials, and demanded that she be given a place on the paper. The editor doubted that Buchanan was really the author of the masterly editorials that he had been publishing and to try her, he asked her to write an editorial on the Canadian monetary system. Without a moment's hesitation Buchanan wrote the article assigned. Storey, thoroughly astonished, made a place for her on the paper. "What salary do you expect," he asked. "The salary of the man whose place I am to take," Buchanan answered. The answer was typical of her. She never allowed anyone to underestimate her work because she was a woman. Not in the least egotistical, she, nevertheless, realized her ability and no false modesty prevented her from frankly admitting it.

=== Marriage ===
In 1874, she married Alexander Sullivan (born August 9, 1847, Waterville, Maine), whom she had met in Detroit. They made their home in Chicago. He was chosen in 1883 as first president of the Irish National League of America with the object to promote home rule in Ireland. He resigned in 1884 to practice law in Chicago. Sullivan's married life, despite the rumors to the contrary, was happy. She never gave up editorial writing but neither did she allow it to interfere with her duties as wife. She generally did her work at her home. A few years after her marriage, Sullivan severed her connection with the Times and became editorial writer on the Chicago Tribune. In 1883, she became associated with the Chicago Herald. The editors, who a few years before had refused to take her on their papers, now clamored for her services. Though a general editorial writer, Sullivan's political editorials gained her the greatest recognition.

=== Paris ===
In 1889, she was sent as representative of the Associated Press to the International Exposition at Paris. She was the first woman who ever represented the press at an international council. When she and her companion presented themselves at the council room, the French official refused them tickets of admission. "But, madam, you are a woman," he said in explanation. "Yes, and in monsieur, I expect to find a gentleman," she answered. The official went on to explain that a woman had never sat at such a gathering, and that it was impossible for him to allow her to enter. With characteristic persistency, Sullivan stuck to her point, saying, "do you not think that Paris should establish a precedent?" She and her companion were given tickets of admission. At the exposition, the President of France wanted to put her in a somewhat subordinate position at some great function held in Paris. She refused as representative of the American press to take it and through a telegram to James G. Blaine, then Secretary of State, she was given the place of honor.

=== Chief editor ===
During the presidential campaign of 1892, she was appointed by the Chicago Herald, a strong Democratic organ, to furnish a series of articles in support of Grover Cleveland. The revised tariff was the main plank in Cleveland's platform and so completely, so convincingly did Sullivan vindicate the new tariff that, in the election, Illinois, which was a strong Republican state, voted Democratic for the first time in its history. When the Chicago Chronicle was established in 1896, Sullivan became its chief editorial writer, a position which she retained until her death. Though a Democratic paper, the Chronicle was opposed to bimetallism and in the election of 1896 espoused the sound money policy of the Republicans. Again, Sullivan was called upon to write a series of campaign editorials. She attacked the free silver stand of the Democrats as vigorously as she had upheld their tariff in the last election. Her editorials "Let the Old Hulk Drift" were used in electioneering speeches throughout the country.

=== Social activist ===
Though not a club woman, Sullivan was intensely interested in all progressive movements. In 1892, during the World's Fair she was elected president of the Women's Educational Society. Always a champion of her sex on sound conservative lines, she believed that women could and should take an active part in public affairs.

Sullivan served as chairperson of a committee composed of delegates elected by Catholic Reading Circles which oversaw the Central Board, Catholic Educational Union, Archdiocese of Chicago. Several years before the Reading Circle method became generally disseminated throughout the country—as early as 1879– a small group of earnest students gathered daily under the tutelage of Sullivan for the enthusiastic acquirement of knowledge. This was really the nucleus of the circle theory in Chicago. The two Reading Circles of the Sacred Heart Institution conducted by Sullivan were probably the most exhaustive in scope and most diversified in plan of entertainment of any of the literary classes of the city. They were organized in October, 1894, the Venerable Mother Barat Circle, named for the woman who established the order in Paris, and the other, the Mother Duchesne Circle, named for the first Superior of the American foundation.

== Personal life ==
Characterized as a perfect wife, there had never been any conflict between Sullivan's home and public life. No one was closer to her than Mother Angela Gillespie. The natural affection which she bore the directress was increased by the deep respect which she felt for her both as a woman and as an educator. In her "Study of a Soul", a tribute which she wrote to the memory of Mother Angela, Sullivan said, "Nor was there any shallowness or affectation in Mother Angela's idea of education for girls... Mere bluestockingism she would have laughed at... She looked upon partial development as fully as dangerous as no development at all."

Sullivan was an ardent advocate of Irish independence. Her love for her native land was intense, passionate. In 1897, she suffered a stroke of paralysis, and, though her health remained somewhat impaired, she continued to write until her death. In 1903, Sullivan suffered another stroke of paralysis and on December 28 of that year she died. On New Year's Eve, her body was taken to Detroit for burial.

== Selected works ==
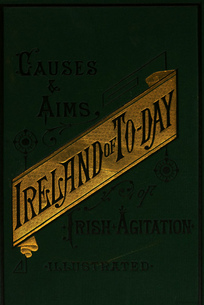
Ireland of To-day: The Causes and Aims of Irish Agitation

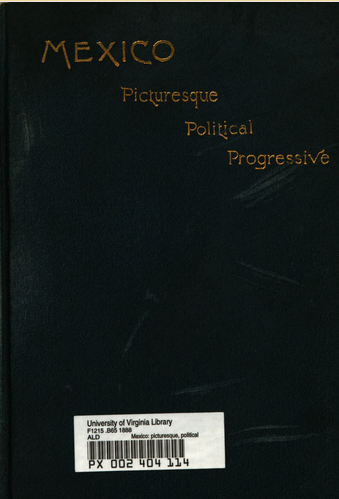
Mexico: Picturesque, Political, Progressive

- Ireland of To-day: The Causes and Aims of Irish Agitation, 1881
- Mexico, Picturesque, Political and Progressive, with Mary Elizabeth McGrath Blake, 1888
