= Elizabeth McGrath =

Elizabeth McGrath may refer to:

- Elizabeth McGrath (artist), American artist nicknamed Bloodbath McGrath
- Elizabeth McGrath (art historian) (born 1945), British art historian and academic
- Elizabeth McGrath (dancer), American ballerina

== See also ==
- Mary Elizabeth McGrath Blake, Irish-American poet
