= Katherine Eleanor Conway =

American journalist and poet (1853–1927)

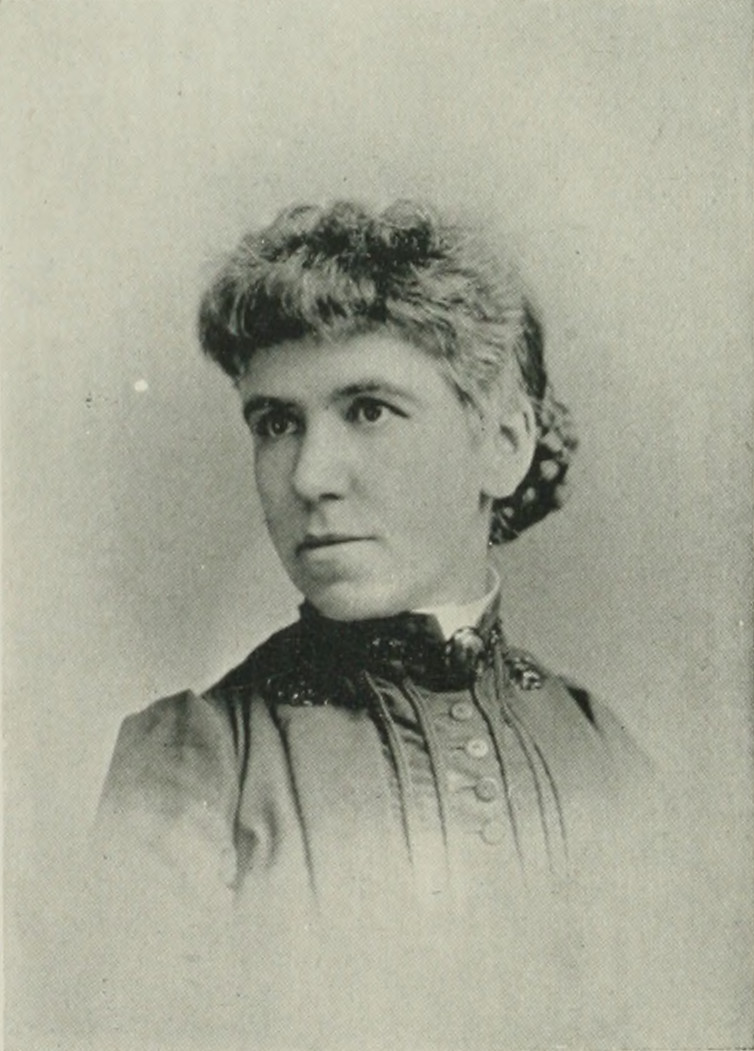
- Conway, c. 1893
- Born: September 6, 1853; Rochester, New York, U.S.
- Died: January 2, 1927 (aged 73); Boston, Massachusetts, U.S.
- Education: St. Mary's Academy, Kenmore, New York
- Occupations: Journalist, editor, poet
- Writing career
- Pen name: Mercedes
- Notable awards: Laetare Medal

Katherine Eleanor Conway (pen name Mercedes; September 6, 1853 – January 2, 1927) was an American journalist, editor, and poet. A devout Catholic, she supported women's education but opposed suffrage. A native of Western New York, Conway worked on various newspapers, including The Pilot, where she served as associate editor (1890–1905) and editor-in-chief/managing editor (1905-1908), "the first and only woman to hold that position, despite never receiving credit on the masthead". She organized the first Catholic reading circle in Boston, serving as its president, and as well as presiding officer of the New England Woman's Press Association. Conway was an active member of the Boston Authors Club, and a reader of original essays on religious and intellectual topics before prominent literary and social clubs. In 1907, she received the Laetare Medal from the University of Notre Dame.

== Early years and education ==
Katherine Eleanor Conway was born in Rochester, New York, September 6, 1853. Her parents came to the United States from western Ireland. On her mother's side, several members of the family had been prominent ecclesiastics in the Catholic Church. She had two siblings, including a brother and a sister, Mary Conway, who founded the Colegio Americano, affiliated with the University of Argentina, in Buenos Aires. Several other family members were prominently associated with journalism in New York City, including Rev. John Conway, who edited a journal in Saint Paul, Minnesota. Conway's father, a successful railroad contractor and bridge builder, was also active in politics.

Her early studies were made in the convent schools of Rochester. The years from 11 to 15 were spent in St. Mary's Academy, in Kenmore, where her inclination to literature was strengthened by a gifted English teacher, At 15, when her first poem appeared, Conway was under the impression that ($241.88 in 2025) was the price usually paid to an editor for the honor of having a poem published in a paper. In her aspirations, she was assisted by her sympathetic friend and adviser, Bishop Bernard John McQuaid, of Rochester, New York.

== Career ==
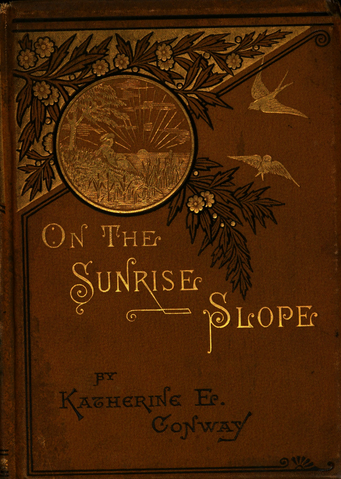
On the Sunrise Slope (1881)

Conway's first work in journalism was done on the Rochester Daily Union and Advertiser. In 1875, she commenced a Catholic monthly, contributing poems and moral tales under the pen name of "Mercedes" to other Catholic journals from spare hours after editing her monthly, and teaching in the convent; She edited the West End Journal, a religious monthly, for five years. Conway served as assistant editor of Buffalo's Catholic Union and Times from 1880 to 1883. In that year, she was invited to visit Boston to recuperate from illness. There, she met the editor who had given her the earliest recognition for her poems by paying with a check, John Boyle O'Reilly. After an opportune vacancy occurred with the staff of The Pilot, O'Reilly offered it to Conway, who accepted and started her new job in the autumn of 1883. Besides a liberal salary, opportunities for outside literary work were often put in Conway's direction by O'Reilly. Two years previous to that change, in 1881, Conway had gathered her poems into a volume, published with the title, On the Sunrise Slope. Conway also edited Clara Erskine Clement Waters's collection, called Christian Symbols and Stories of the Saints as Illustrated in Art.

Conway organized the first Catholic reading circle in Boston, of which she was president, and served as presiding officer of the New England Woman's Press Association. In the spring of 1891, Conway was invited to give before the Woman's Council in Washington, D.C., her paper upon "The Literature of Moral Loveliness". She was the first Catholic who appeared before the Women's Educational and Industrial Union of Boston to speak upon a religious theme. Also during that year, she read before the Women's Press Club papers on "Some Obstacles to Women's Success in Journalism", "Personal Journalism", and "On Magnifying Mine Office", a satire. Her poems appeared in The Providence Journal and Life, with articles of literary trend in the Catholic and secular periodicals. Conway was chosen president of the press department of the Isabella Association, in connection with the World's Columbian Exposition in Chicago. She served as associate editor of The Pilot, under James Jeffrey Roche, chief editor; she was an active member of the Boston Authors' Club, and a reader of original essays on religious and intellectual topics before prominent literary and social clubs. Conway, who had chronic poor health, supported women's education but opposed suffrage.

She died in Boston on January 2, 1927.

== Selected works ==
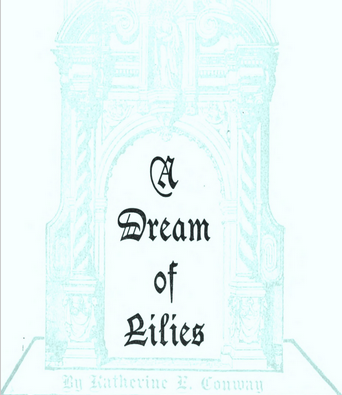
A Dream of Lilies (1893)

- Watchwords From John Boyle O'Reilly, Edited and With Estimate
- Bettering Ourselves, containing the earlier numbers of the "Family Sitting-Room Series"
- On the sunrise slope, 1881
- The Good Shepherd in Boston, 1892
- A dream of lilies, 1893
- Making friends and keeping them, 1895
- New footsteps in well-trodden ways, 1899
- The Way of the World and Other Ways, 1900
- Lalor's maples, 1901
- Questions of Honor in the Christian Life, 1903
- The Christian gentlewoman and the social apostolate, 1904
- Charles Francis Donnelly : a memoir, with an account of the hearings on a bill for the inspection of private schools in Massachusetts in 1888-1889, 1909
- The story of a beautiful childhood, 1909
- The woman who never did wrong : and other stories, 1909
- A lady and her letters, 1910
- The color of life; a selection from the poems of Katherine E. Conway, 1927

== Honors ==
- 1907, Laetare Medal, University of Notre Dame
- 1912, Cross of Honor, Pro Ecclesia et Pontifice (for Church and Pope), Pope Pius X
