= Western New York Catholic =

Monthly newspaper from Buffalo, NY

- Type: Monthly newspaper
- Format: Print and online
- Owner: Roman Catholic Diocese of Buffalo
- Founder(s): Rev. Dr. Louis A. Lambert and Bishop Stephen V. Ryan
- Publisher: Diocese of Buffalo
- Founded: 1872 (as The Catholic Union)
- Language: English
- Headquarters: Buffalo, New York
- Website: wnycatholic.org

The Western New York Catholic (formerly Magnificat, Catholic Union and Echo, Catholic Union and Times and The Catholic Union) was a monthly newspaper published by the Catholic Diocese of Buffalo, New York, founded in 1872. The paper ceased publication in September 2025.

== History ==
Rev. Dr. Louis A. Lambert and Bishop Stephen V. Ryan founded The Catholic Union in 1872 in Waterloo, New York. It became The Catholic Union and Times after a merger in 1881. Editors included Katherine Eleanor Conway and Irish-American community leader and priest Patrick Cronin (1836–1905). In August 1939, another merger with The Catholic Echo created the Catholic Union and Echo. Horace Frommelt was an editor, and Father William P. Solleder a managing director, in the early 1940s, and the paper took an anti-war stance. Bishop James McNulty sought a name change in 1963, and a public naming contest resulted in the title Magnificat being adopted. In March 1966, the body of then editor, Reverend Monsignor Francis J. O'Connor, was found floating in Scajaquada Creek with facial bruises. The publication became known as the Western New York Catholic in 1981.
