= Pearl Rivers =

American poet and journalist

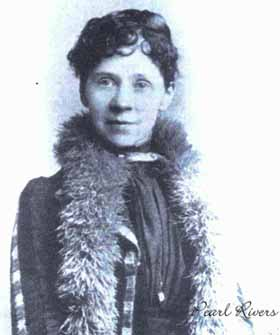
- Eliza J. Nicholson
- Born: Eliza Jane Poitevent; March 11, 1843; Gainesville, Mississippi
- Died: February 15, 1896 (aged 52); New Orleans, Louisiana
- Resting place: Metairie Cemetery
- Education: Amite Female Seminary, Liberty, Mississippi
- Occupations: Journalist, poet
- Writing career
- Pen name: Pearl Rivers
- Language: English
- Period: 1859-1896

Pearl Rivers (pen name of Eliza Jane Nicholson; formerly Holbrook; née Poitevent; March 11, 1843 – February 15, 1896) was an American journalist and poet, and the first female editor of a major American newspaper. After being the literary editor of the New Orleans Daily Picayune, Rivers became the owner and publisher in 1876, after her elderly husband died. In 1880, she took over as managing editor, where she continued until her death in 1896.

She took her pen name from the Pearl River, which was located near her home in Mississippi. She did not let traditional norms hold her back from doing what she wished. Most of her newspaper work was pursued against the wishes of her family and society.

== Early life and education ==
Eliza Jane Poitevent was born in Gainesville, Hancock, Mississippi, USA, on March 11, 1843 (as confirmed by several documents, including the 1850 census and the birth records of her sons). She was the third child of a prosperous family of five, with a busy father and a sickly mother. She is listed on the 1850 U.S. Census as living in Beat 2 of Hancock County, Mississippi, with an age of seven and younger siblings in the household.

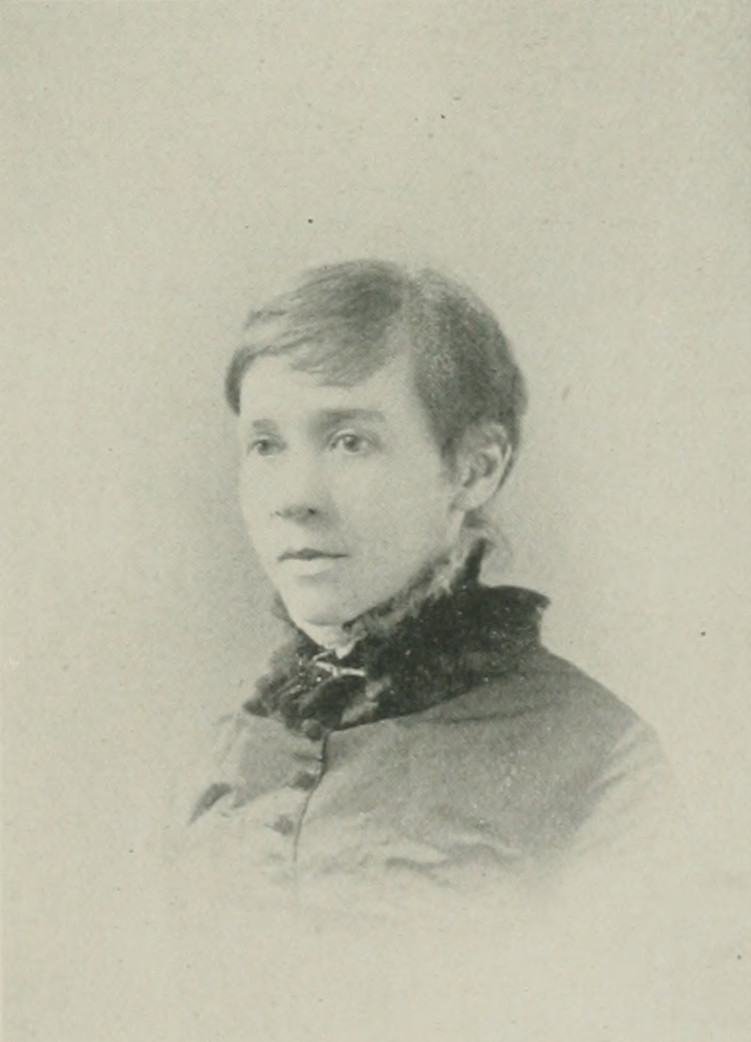
Eliza J. Nicholson, "A woman of the century"

When she was nine years old, she moved to her aunt Jane's house in the vicinity of today's Picayune, Mississippi. Her uncle Leonard Kimball managed a plantation, a store, and a toll bridge there. She was sent to the Amite Female Seminary in Liberty, Mississippi, graduating in 1859, where she earned (or gave herself) the title of the "wildest girl in school".

Rivers' first romance was with a young man she had met while at the seminary, but this was suppressed by the headmaster and her uncle. During the American Civil War (1861–1865) she may have fallen in love with a soldier, since such a romance was described in a group of poems she wrote in 1866 for the New Orleans Times.

== Career ==
After the war, she submitted her work to newspapers and magazines under the pseudonym "Pearl Rivers". Her poems appeared in the New Orleans literary sheet The South, as well as the New York Home Journal and the New York Ledger. On 17 October 1866, the New Orleans newspaper The Daily Picayune published her poem "A Little Bunch of Roses", the first of her works known to have appeared in that paper. From 1867 onward, all of her published work appeared in that newspaper.

During a 1868 visit to her grandfather in New Orleans, Rivers met Alva M. Holbrook, a co-owner of The Daily Picayune. He invited her to become literary editor of the newspaper, a position she accepted. In May 1872, she married Holbrook, who was divorced and thirty-four years her senior. In a letter to a former partner, she wrote that Holbrook "never did, and never will" love her. Approximately one month after the marriage, Holbrook's former wife returned from New York and confronted Rivers with a pistol and a bottle of rum. Legal proceedings followed and continued for an extended period.

Holbrook died in 1876 while insolvent, with debts amounting to $80,000. Ownership of the newspaper passed to his widow, who continued its operation. Rivers later formed a relationship with the paper's business manager, George Nicholson, who was married at the time. Following the death of Nicholson's first wife, Nicholson and Rivers married in June 1878.

=== Picayune owner ===
George Nicholson acquired a 25 percent ownership stake in The Daily Picayune and served as its business manager. During his tenure, the newspaper reduced its outstanding debt and increased advertising revenue. Rivers oversaw a range of editorial and organisational changes that contributed to growth in circulation and positioned the paper among the leading journals in the southern United States. These changes included the addition of content focused on women, sports, children, poetry, and literary fiction. She also introduced a gossip column and hired Dorothy Dix, an early women's advice columnist. In 1881, she appointed Martha R. Field as the newspaper's first salaried female reporter. Writing under a pseudonym, Field produced the "Catherine Cole's Letter" column and contributed to a second feature, "Women's World and Work".

The introduction of a society column on 16 March 1879, titled the "Society Bee", generated criticism from some readers. One correspondent described it as "shabby", "shoddy", and "shameful" for naming women in a newspaper. By 1890, however, the column had become the largest section of the Sunday edition and was widely imitated by other publications.

The newspaper's visual presentation also changed during this period. Advertising was removed from standard column space and placed in boxed formats, first introduced in June 1882. Illustrations were uncommon before 1885, but by 1887 the paper regularly featured chalk plate drawings. The Weather Frog character appeared in cartoons beginning on 13 January 1894, and a political cartoon was published following Rivers' death on 18 April 1896. The paper increasingly adopted a family-oriented format, and between 1880 and 1890 its circulation more than tripled, alongside growth in size and influence.

Under Rivers' editorship, the newspaper opposed political corruption, expressed firm views on public works along the Mississippi River, supported railroad development, and advocated various political reforms. At the same time, its editorial positions reflected the views of much of its readership. The paper adopted a hostile stance toward the Negro Republican Party and published editorials in the 1890s supporting the disenfranchisement of Black voters, using language that characterised them as "unfit to vote, ignorant, shiftless, depraved and criminal-minded", and alleging their manipulation by a "ring" of white politicians. Reports of lynchings of Black individuals were typically brief and lacked critical commentary.

== Affiliations ==
Rivers became the first president of the National Woman's Press Association in 1884, and became the first honorary member of the New York Women's Press Club. In March 1886, the editor of the New York magazine Forest and Stream invited "Mr. E.J. Nicholson" to be vice-president of the Audubon Society. Two weeks later, the editor apologized for assuming Rivers was a man and ranking her with the "inferior sex".

A lover of animals, Rivers wrote editorials criticizing dog fighting and the beating of horses and mules. She was a driving force in launching the New Orleans Society for the Prevention of Cruelty to Animals in 1888.

== Personal life and death ==
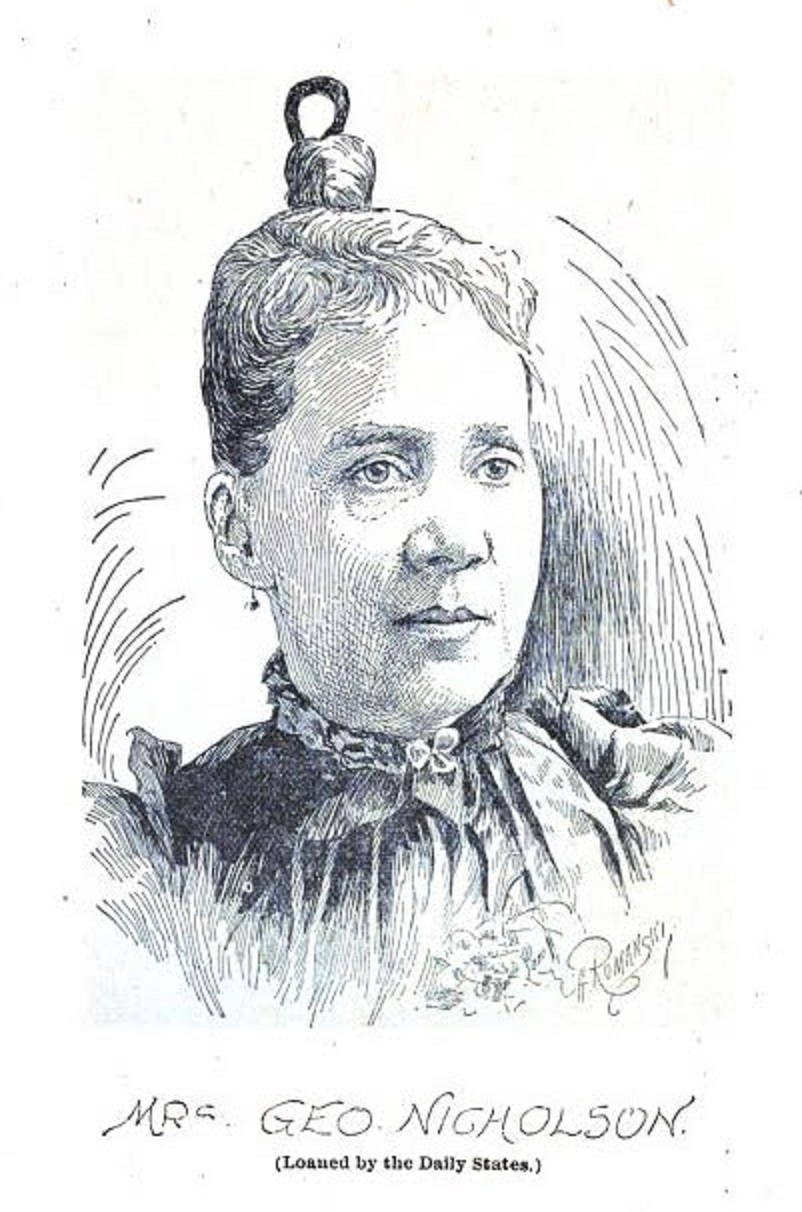
Eliza J. Nicholson, pen name Pearl Rivers, from Some Notables of New Orleans, 1896

George Nicholson died on 4 February 1896 from complications related to influenza. Eliza Nicholson died of the same illness on 15 February 1896, during a widespread epidemic in New Orleans. At the time of her death, the Daily Picayune had more than doubled its circulation during her tenure and had become a newspaper of national significance. She left two sons and was buried with Nicholson in Metairie Cemetery.

== Literary achievements ==
Rivers' early rhyming verse was mainly pastoral, with some poetry touching on love and heartbreak and, in retrospect, was not exceptional although it revealed a keen perception of nature. However, Dr. W.H. Holcomb, a scholarly critic at the time wrote of her book Lyrics that "She stands by this volume ahead of any other Southern poet, and no female writer in America, from Mrs. Sigourney to the Carey [sic] sisters, has evidenced more poetic genius".

An example of her early poetry, first published anonymously:

Whistling through the corn field,
Whistling a merry air,
My feet are deep in the pea-vines,
And tangles are in my hair.

Old folks say 'tis unlucky
For maidens to whistle; still,
Life is a rugged country,
And whistling helps uphill.

Talking of her early life in the poem Myself, she introduced the "gossip-loving bee," who gave its name to the Society Bee column:

With windows low and narrow too,
Where birds came peeping in
To wake me up at early morn
And oft I used to win

The Cherokees to climb the sill,
The gossip loving bee,
To come so near that he would pause
And buzz a word to me.

Her later blank verse works "Hagar" and "Leah", published in Cosmopolitan in 1893 and 1894, have more depth, giving a powerful sense of the bitterness and jealousy of her heroines.

Her further work, however, was in journalism. Through the use of prose she gave personal commentary on many of the issues of the day. Despite a lack of confidence in her abilities, she was a discerning writer.

== Selected works ==
- Pearl Rivers (2008) [1873]. Lyrics (2008 reprint ed.). BiblioBazaar, LLC. ISBN 0-554-56958-2.
