= Martha R. Field =

American journalist

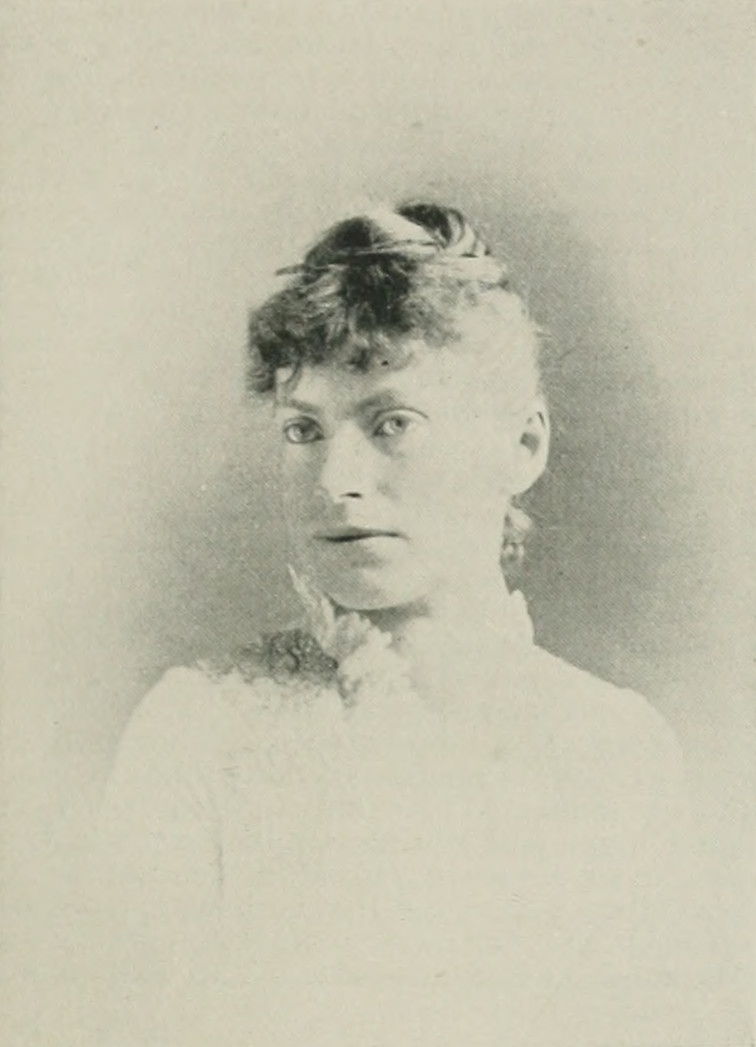
Martha R Field

Martha Reinhard Smallwood Field (May 24, 1854 – December 19, 1898), known as Mattie Field, was an American journalist. She usually wrote under the pen name Catherine Cole or Catharine Cole. She was one of the earliest professional women newspaper reporters in New Orleans, Louisiana. A champion of women's education and social justice, she also founded the city's first circulating library and helped found a number of other civic institutions.

== Early years and family ==
Martha Reinhard Smallwood, known as Mattie, was born in Lexington, Missouri to Emma (née Reinhard) Smallwood and W.M. Smallwood, a newspaper editor who moved his family to New Orleans, Louisiana in the 1860s when he took up a position as editor for The Times-Picayune. She published her first piece of writing in the New Orleans Republican at the age of 15.

== Journalism career ==
Upon leaving school, she went to work for the Republican before moving to San Francisco, California, where she became a journalist for the San Francisco Chronicle. In San Francisco, she married stockbroker Charles W. Field, with whom she had a daughter, Flora, (Flo Field) who later became a journalist and wrote the play A La Creole. Shortly thereafter, Field died. Mattie, now widowed, moved back to New Orleans. She moved in with her parents and worked with her father at the Times-Picayune. It was there that she first adopted the pen-name Catharine Cole. In 1881, Pearl Rivers, the owner of the Picayune hired her as a full-time reporter. She was the first woman to hold a staff position on the newspaper.

Field wrote a weekly column, "Catherine Cole's Letter", the topics of which ranged from literary news to personalities, short stories, and travel pieces. She also edited and sometimes wrote (anonymously) another weekly column, "Women's World and Work". Rivers sent Field to Europe several times to develop material for her columns.

Field became known as a champion of women's education and other issues affecting working women. In 1888, she wrote an exposé of the appalling conditions in the Insane Asylum of Louisiana (now known as the East Louisiana State Hospital). She also founded the first circulating library in New Orleans and helped found the New Orleans Training School for Nurses, the Women's Exchange, several local kindergartens, and the local branch of the Society for the Prevention of Cruelty to Animals.

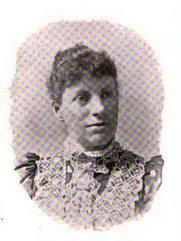
Martha R. Field (1894)

In 1892, Field embarked on a tour of Louisiana to report on the state's local attractions, receiving warm welcomes that attested to the wide reach of her vividly written columns. This tour resulted in a number of columns devoted to specific Louisiana parishes. In 1894, she suddenly left the Picayune for its main rival, the Times-Democrat. In 1897, a compilation of Field's work was published under the title Catherine Cole's Book.

== Death and legacy ==
In the 1890s, Field developed hand tremors, which led to a diagnosis of "paralysis agitans", now known as Parkinson's disease. In her final years, she was cared for by her daughter, continuing to write and later dictate her columns until the last few months of her life. Four months before she died, she was moved to a Chicago sanatorium, where she died in 1898. Her body was returned to New Orleans for burial.

Tulane University holds an archive of Field's newspaper articles along with photographs, scrapbooks, and other material. The archive includes biographical materials written by her daughter.

== Excerpt ==
The following is from Field's 1888 column on the Insane Asylum of Louisiana:

The method of incarcerating people in the insane asylum is apparently of the easiest. All that appears to be necessary is an order from some court. To this may or may not be appended the certificate of an examining physician. The average formula presented to the asylum for the admission of patients is exceedingly simple. In the usual technical phrases, the judge declares that one so-and-so, giving the name or nickname by which the person has been known, is to be held in the asylum.... If this is within the law, it is a terribly lax and wicked law that works directly in the interest of criminals who desire to get rid of persons without doing actual murder.
