= Cynthia Holmes Belcher =

American journalist (1827–1911)

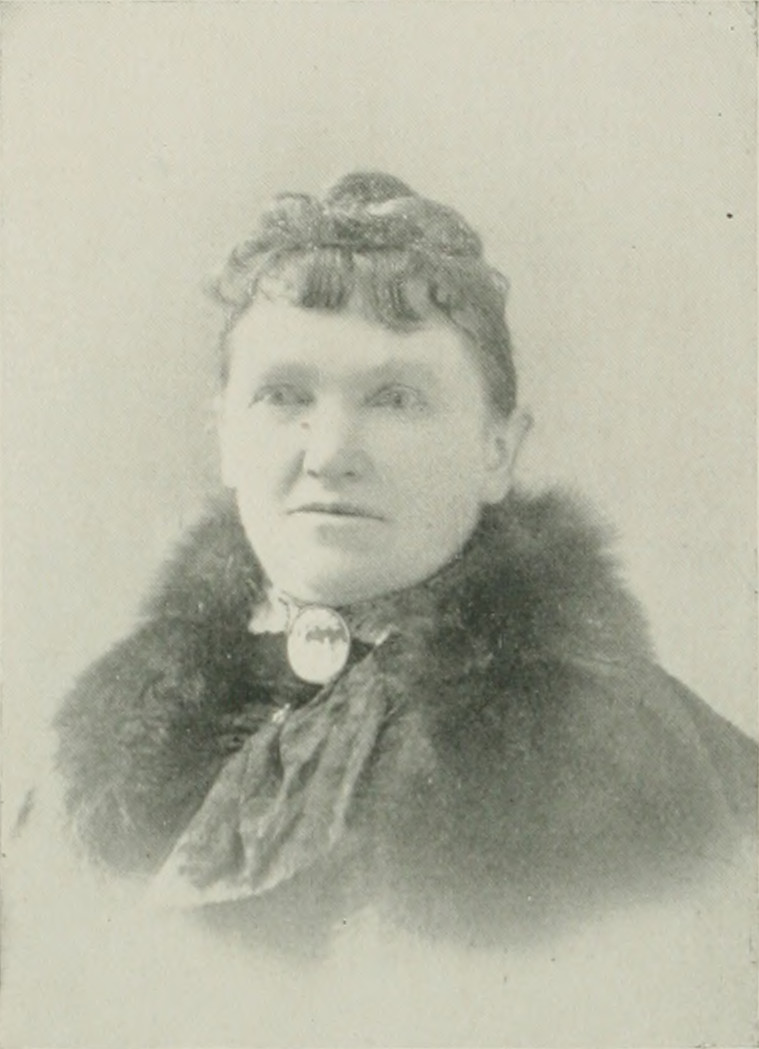
- Born: December 1, 1827
- Died: March 22, 1911 (aged 83)
- Education: New England Conservatory of Music
- Occupation: Journalist

Cynthia Holmes Belcher (December 1, 1827 – March 22, 1911) was an American journalist born in Lunenburg, Vermont.

== Early life ==
She was the daughter of the Hon. George E. and Mary Moore Holmes. Her father served as a member of the State Senate and as judge in Essex County. Holmes was educated in the academy in St. Johnsbury, Vermont. Her father removed her family of seven daughters from St. Johnsbury to Port Byron, Illinois, when she was eighteen years old.

At age 20, she was married to Nathaniel Belcher, a descendant of prominent New England people and one of the pioneers in the settlement of Illinois. He held various offices of trust and was a member of the Whig Party that nominated General Winfield Scott for the presidency, and was a prolific political writer.

They travelled extensively. In 1881, they visited Colorado, and in 1882 went to California, where they passed a pleasant year. Their tour included all parts of the Union. On one of their visits to Washington, D.C., they were received by President Franklin Pierce, and on a later occasion visited President Grant in the White House.

== Career ==
After the death of her husband and two children, Belcher returned to New England and settled in Boston where she developed her literary, artistic, and musical talents. She studied singing in the New England Conservatory of Music and gradually became known as a contributor to leading newspapers. She was a member of the New England Woman's Press Association.

In 1889, she visited Europe and contributed letters on her travels through the different countries, also describing the Paris Exposition. Besides her literary work, she has been identified with works of reform and with church and temperance work, the suffrage movement in particular receiving much thought and labor from her.
