= S. Fannie Gerry Wilder =

American author (1850–1923)

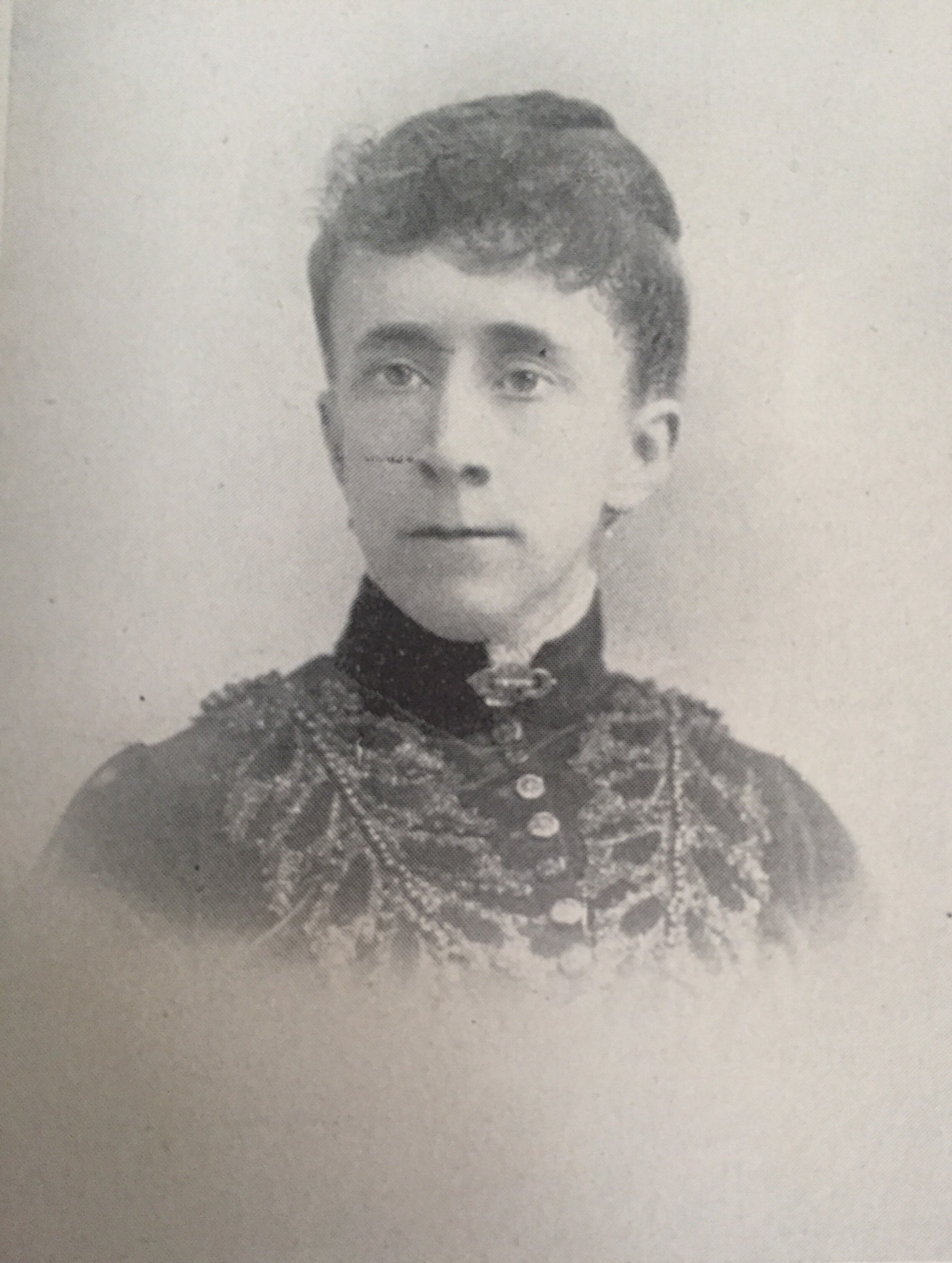
Portrait of Wilder from A Woman of the Century

Sarah Frances Gerry Wilder (September 4, 1850 – April 26, 1923) was an American writer.

== Early life and education ==
Sarah Frances Gerry was born in Standish, Maine, on September 4, 1850. She was the daughter of Rev. Edwin Jerome Gerry (1820–1885) and Sophia J. Goodwin (1827–1898). Her father was settled over the Unitarian parish in that town seven years, then going to New York, where he was connected with the Children's Aid Society for five years, and finally accepted a rail from the Benevolent Fraternity of Churches to settle in Boston as pastor of the Hanover Street Chapel, where he remained as minister for twenty-five years.

Gerry, although born in Maine, was essentially a Bostonian, as she was educated in the schools of that city and lived in the vicinity nearly all her life.

== Career ==
As S. Fannie Gerry grew to womanhood, her interest became naturally identified with her father's work, in assisting the poorer class among whom he labored. She was looked upon by the people of his parish as a sister, friend and helper.

She was very fond of history and literature in her school-days, taking a high rank in composition during that time. After the death of her father, her desire became so great to place his work and life before the public, that it might serve to inspire others, that she wrote, in 1887, his memoir, entitled The Story of a Useful Life: Edwin J. Gerry. 1820-1885.

Afterward she wrote for different papers and magazines, making a specialty of stories for children. Her love for the work increased every year, and in 1890 she published a book for young people, entitled Boston Girls at Home and Abroad. She then published another book for young people, historical in character, entitled Looking Westward: A Romance of 1620.

She was an active member of the New England Woman's Press Association, and was connected with various other societies. She was elected secretary of the Arlington, Massachusetts, branch of the Chautauqua Literary Social Circle for 1892.

== Personal life ==
On June 16, 1881, Sarah F. Gerry married Millard F. Wilder, a young business man of Arlington. They had one son, Edwin Gerry Wilder (February 29, 1884 – March 22, 1884), who died an infant.

She died on April 26, 1923, and is buried with her son and parents at Evergreen Cemetery, Leominster.
