= Emily Greene Wetherbee =

American poet

Emily Greene Wetherbee (January 6, 1839 - August 28, 1897) was an American poet, author, and educator. Today, she is best remembered by the elementary/middle school named after her, The Emily G. Wetherbee School in Lawrence, MA.

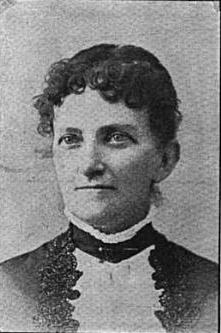
Emily Greene Wetherbee

== Biography ==
Wetherbee was born in Milford, N.H. in 1839. She was the youngest of 8 children born to parents Isaac and Sophia (née Greene). She spent her early years in Charlestown, MA in the neighborhood of Bunker Hill. At age twelve she moved to Lawrence, Massachusetts, where she graduated from Lawrence High School in 1856. She spent the rest of her life in Lawrence with the exception of some years she spent working in the Boston public schools.

== Writer ==
Wetherbee was intimately connected with the literary and social life of Lawrence. She was published in the Boston newspapers “Journal”, “Transcript” and “Globe” as well as in the New England “Journal of Education”, “The American Institute of Instruction”, “Good Housekeeping” and “The Lawrence American”. She wrote humor under the nom de plume “Maria Green”.

She spent ten years as the president of Old Residents’ Association, a group dedicated “to collect and preserve facts relating to the history of Lawrence; to encourage social intercourse, local enterprise, and intellectual and moral culture”. Additional positions included president of the Lawrence Women's Club, vice president of Lawrence High School Alumni Association, staff member of the Lawrence American, and a member of the New England Woman's Press Association.

== Educator ==
Wetherbee initially taught in the Oak Street School in Lawrence and later accepted a position in Bowdoin Grammar School in Boston. She remained in Boston for seven years, before returning to Lawrence in 1870 where she taught Latin and English Literature at for over 25 years. She was the teacher of renowned poet Robert Frost.

== Death ==
She died at the Lawrence General Hospital from peritonitis on August 28, 1897. Upon her death, her friends complied many of her poems and Writings in a memorial book. She was buried in the Bellevue Cemetery in the family plot of the Clarke family. The Emily G. Wetherbee School on Newtown Street in Lawrence, MA was named in her honor.
