= Charlotte Porter =

American poet, translator, and literary critic

Charlotte Endymion Porter
- Born: Helen Charlotte Porter; January 6, 1857; Towanda, Pennsylvania
- Died: January 16, 1942 (aged 85); Melrose, Massachusetts
- Education: Wells College
- Occupations: Writer, translator, editor
- Partner: Helen Archibald Clarke
- Relatives: Helen Tracy Lowe-Porter (niece)
- Writing career
- Pen name: Robert Iphys Everett

Charlotte Endymion Porter (January 6, 1857 – January 16, 1942) was an American poet, translator, and literary critic and the cofounder and coeditor of the journal Poet Lore. She was the editor or coeditor of editions of the complete works of William Shakespeare, Robert Browning, and Elizabeth Barrett Browning. She worked as a translator of major writers from around the world for Poet Lore. She was influential in shaping the American literary taste of her day.

== Education ==
Helen Charlotte Porter was born in Towanda, Pennsylvania, in 1857, one of three children of Henry Clinton Porter, a physician, and Elisa Eleanor (Betts) Porter. She later changed her name to Charlotte Endymion Porter, taking her middle name from a poem by John Keats. She attended Wells College in New York, graduating in 1875 and extending her studies in Shakespeare and French drama at the Sorbonne in Paris.

== Journal editor and founder ==
In 1883, having moved to Philadelphia, Pennsylvania, she became the editor of the journal Shakespeariana. Through her work with this journal, she met her life partner, the writer Helen Archibald Clarke (1860–1926), with whom she afterwards collaborated on many projects. Porter resigned from the journal in 1887 after a dispute over her plans for expansion, following which she became for a short time the editor of the journal Ethical Record.

In 1889, Porter and Clarke founded the quarterly journal Poet Lore in Philadelphia, later moving it to Boston. Its stated aim was to champion the "comparative study of literature" and the work of Shakespeare and Robert Browning. After the first few years, the journal's focus on writing about Shakespeare and Browning shifted to encompass a broader view of world literature. In keeping with its mission, the magazine published few American writers but many from around the world, often in translation. Poet Lore helped introduce American readers to the work of such early modern writers as Henrik Ibsen, August Strindberg, Gabriele D’Annunzio, Selma Lagerlöf, Gerhart Hauptmann, Maxim Gorky, Maurice Maeterlinck, Arthur Schnitzler, and Rabindranath Tagore. Many of these translations were by Porter, who developed a reputation as a good translator.

Porter and Clarke sold Poet Lore in 1903 but continued for many years as editors. Poet Lore is still in print, the oldest continuing poetry magazine in the United States.

== Authorship ==
In tandem with her work on the journals, Porter edited a 40-volume edition of Shakespeare and co-edited with Clarke editions of the British poets Robert Browning and Elizabeth Barrett Browning. Together with Clarke, she published Clever Tales (1897), a book of translations of European authors like Villiers de L'Isle Adam, Ludovic Halévy, Vsevolod Garshin, Jakub Arbes, and Strindberg. Along with her work on Poet Lore, these efforts are credited with helping to shape American literary taste of the day.

Porter was also a poet, publishing in magazines such as The Atlantic Monthly, The Century Magazine, and Ainslee's Magazine and producing a volume of poems entitled Lips of Music in 1910. She published some of her poems under the pseudonym 'Robert Iphys Everett', and some of her poems were set to music by Clarke, Margaret Ruthven Lang, and Mabel Hill.

Porter was a member and longtime vice-president (1903–1936) of the Boston Browning Society. The society sponsored Porter's 1902 stage adaptation of Robert Browning's tragedy Return of the Druses (which was published the following year). Porter was also a member of Julia Ward Howe's Boston Authors Club.

== Later life ==
Towards the end of her life, Porter lived on the Isle au Haut in Maine in the summers and the remainder of the year in Massachusetts. She died in 1942 in Melrose, Massachusetts.

Porter's niece, Helen Tracy Lowe-Porter, would follow in her footsteps and become a noted translator. Through her niece, Porter is the great-great-great-aunt of Boris Johnson, former prime minister of the UK.

== Books ==
As author

- Lips of Music. New York: Thos. Y. Crowell, 1910 (poems)
- Return of the Druses. New York: Crowell, 1903 (stage version of Robert Browning's tragedy)
- Shakespeare Studies: Macbeth. Cincinnati: American Book Company, 1901 (with Clarke)
- Shakespeare Study Programs: The Tragedies. Boston: RG Badger, 1914

As translator

- Clever Tales (1897, with Clarke)

As editor

- Browning, Robert. The Complete Works of Robert Browning. New York: Kelmscott Society and Thos. Y. Crowell, 1898 (with Clarke; 12 volumes)
- Browning, Elizabeth Barrett. Works: The Complete Works of Elizabeth Barrett Browning. New York: Thos. Y. Crowell, 1900 (with Clarke; 6 volumes)
- Shakespeare, William. First Folio Edition of Shakespeare. New York: Thos. Y. Crowell, 1903–13 (40 volumes)
