= Kate Tannatt Woods =

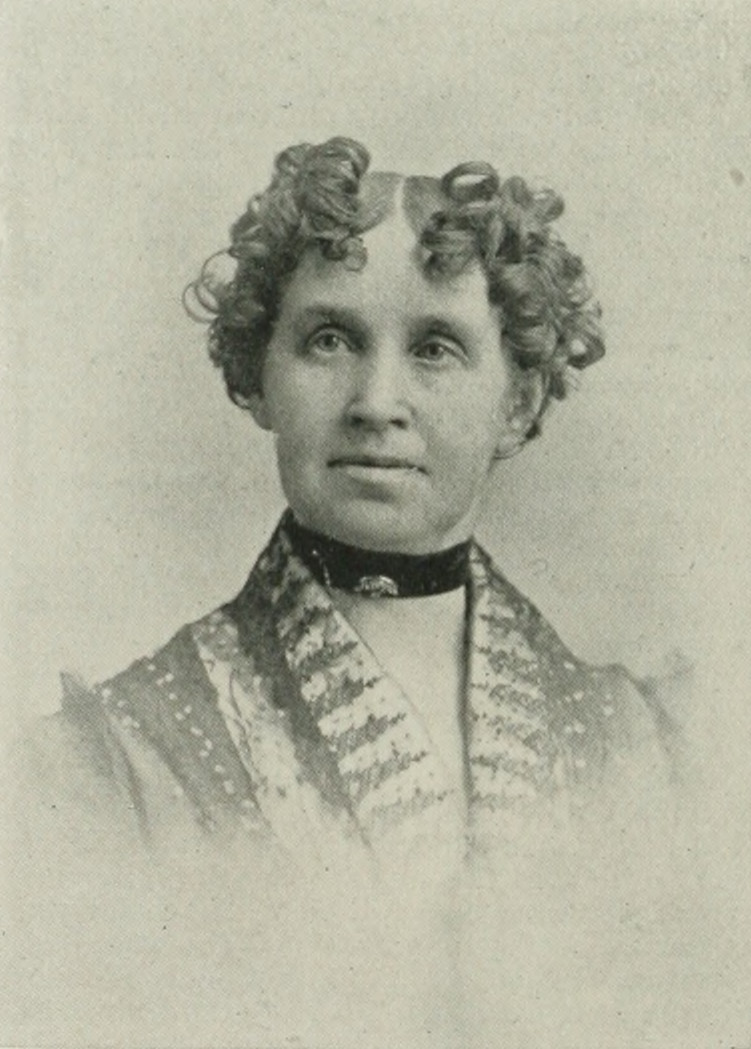
- "A Woman of the Century"
- Born: Kate Tannatt; December 29, 1838; Peekskill, New York
- Died: July 12, 1910 (aged 71); Buffalo, New York
- Spouse: George H. Woods
- Writing career
- Notable works: A Fair Maid of Marblehead; That Dreadful Boy

Kate Tannatt Woods (1838–1910) was an American author, editor, journalist, and clubwoman. She published a number of children's books and novels, and her poems, short stories, and articles were published widely in newspapers and magazines. She was the founder and first president of the Thought and Work Club of Salem, Massachusetts.

== Early life and education ==
Kate Tannatt was born in Peekskill, New York, on December 29, 1838, to James S. Tannatt, an editor, and Mary Gilmore Tannatt. She studied at the Peekskill Seminary but had to leave due to poor health, and continued her education with private tutors. After the death of her father, her family lived briefly in New Hampshire before moving to Salem, Massachusetts. Tannatt taught for a time in the local public schools.

Tannatt published her first written work at the age of ten. Much of her early work was published under the pseudonym "Kate True."

== Career ==
=== Writing ===
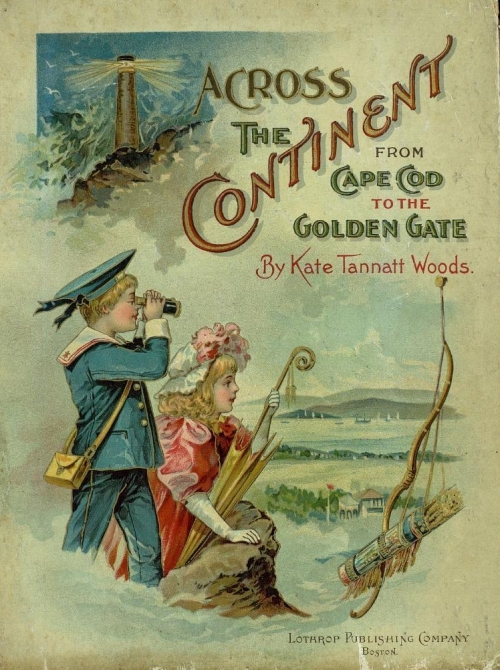
Cover of Across the Continent from Cape Cod to the Golden Gate by Kate Tannatt Woods, 1897

To help support her family, Tannatt Woods published children's books, novels, travelogues, poems, short stories, and nonfiction articles. Her work appeared in periodicals such as the Boston Globe, the Boston Herald, the Boston Transcript, and Harper's Bazaar, and she was an editor of the Ladies Home Journal. Her children's books include Six Little Rebels (1879), All Around a Rocking-Chair (1879), Dr. Dick (1881), Out and About (1882), The Duncans on Land and Sea (1883), Toots and His Friends (1883), and Twice Two (1883). Her novels include That Dreadful Boy (1886), The Minister's Secret (1888), Hester Hepworth (1889), A Fair Maid of Marblehead (1889), Hidden for Years (1895), and A Little New-England Maid (1895).

=== Women's club activities ===
In 1891, while living in Salem, she founded the Thought and Work Club and was elected its first president. The club's purpose was to encourage women "in all departments of literary work, to promote home study, and to secure literary and social advantages for its members." The club met twice a month at a tearoom on Lynde Street. In addition to literary activities, the club organized civics classes, which were addressed by city officials and state senators, and foreign-language classes. At its peak the club had over 300 members. Its motto was "Lofty thoughts and kindly deeds," and its emblem was a pansy, a symbol of thought. The women worked to improve local schoolrooms, clean the streetcars, and elect women to the school board. They successfully campaigned for a half-holiday for store clerks, and published a book of proverbs. Honorary members included Mary Livermore and Laura Ormiston Chant.

Tannatt Woods was also an officer of the General Federation of Women's Clubs, and a member of the New England Women's Club, the New England Woman's Press Association, the Unity Art Club of Boston, the Wintergreen Club, the Authors' Society of London, and the Moral Education Association of Boston. She was involved in the founding of the Salem Moral Education Association, later renamed the Woman's Friend Society, an organization which provided an employment bureau, a reading room, and a home for young women.

In 1893, when the Swami Vivekananda traveled to the United States to attend the Parliament of the World's Religions, Tannatt Woods hosted him in her home on North Street, Salem, which she called "Maple Rest." Once her children were grown, she frequently gave readings from her own work and lectures on historical subjects.

== Personal life and legacy ==
She married attorney George H. Woods of Minnesota, and moved with him to Minneapolis, where she had her first child and published some of her best-received poems and short stories. During the Civil War, her husband served as a first lieutenant in the First Minnesota Regiment under General Sherman. Tannatt joined him at the front, bringing her two small children with her, and volunteered as a nurse. Her husband was seriously injured in battle, leaving him partially disabled.

In addition to raising two children, Tannatt Woods cared for her husband's elderly parents. After her husband's death, she resettled in Salem. She died in Buffalo, New York, on July 12, 1910, at the home of her son Prince.

She is remembered in connection with the Thought and Work Club on the Salem Women's Heritage Trail.
