= Hugh Archibald Clarke =

Canadian composer, organist and music teacher

Hugh Archibald Clarke (August 15, 1839 – December 16, 1927) was a Canadian composer, organist, and music teacher.

== Early life ==
Hugh Archibald Clarke was born in Toronto, Ontario, Canada in 1839. Clarke was exposed to music at a very young age, this interest is edified by his father, James Paton Clarke, who was a Mus. Doc. of Oxford University. At the age of twelve, Clarke began to play the organ at his church.

After Clarke and his wife, Jane Searle, immigrant to Philadelphia, Pennsylvania, he volunteered as the organist at the Second Presbyterian Church for 22 years.

In Pennsylvania, Clarke established himself as an organist and teacher. In 1875, he was appointed professor of music at the University of Pennsylvania and remained an instructor there for 50 years. Eventually, he was named head of the School of Fine Arts in 1920. He also formed and led the university's Abt Male Chorus. His pupils included William W. Gilchrist, Preston Ware Orem, and Edward M. Zimmerman.

Clarke became known as one of the earliest specialists in music theory in North America, the other being John Knowles Paine who taught at Harvard University. Some of his known students include William W. Gilchrist, John Sylvanus Thompson, and Clarke's own daughter, the literary critic and composer Helen A. Clarke.

Clarke died in Philadelphia, Pennsylvania in 1927 at the age of 88.

== Works ==
Clarke wrote several books and musical pieces that are acknowledged worldwide. His most notable work, which earned him an honorary doctorate, is his 1886 composition to the Archanians by Aristophanes. Other well-known pieces are the music for the play Iphigenia in Tauris by Euripides, the cantata The Music of the Spheres, and the oratorio Jerusalem.

== Books ==
- Pronouncing Dictionary of Musical Terms
- A System of Harmony: Founded on Key Relationship, by Means of Which a Thorough Knowledge of the Rules That Govern the Combinations and Successions of Sounds May Be Easily Acquired with or without a Teacher
- Counterpoint Strict and Free; Double Counterpoint, Imitation, Fugue and Canon
- Harmony on the Inductive Method
- Melodies of Mood and Tense
- Harold
- The Scratch Club
- Highways and Byways of Music
- Music and the Comrade Arts
