= Mary Agnes Bishop =

American journalist, editor (1857–1934)

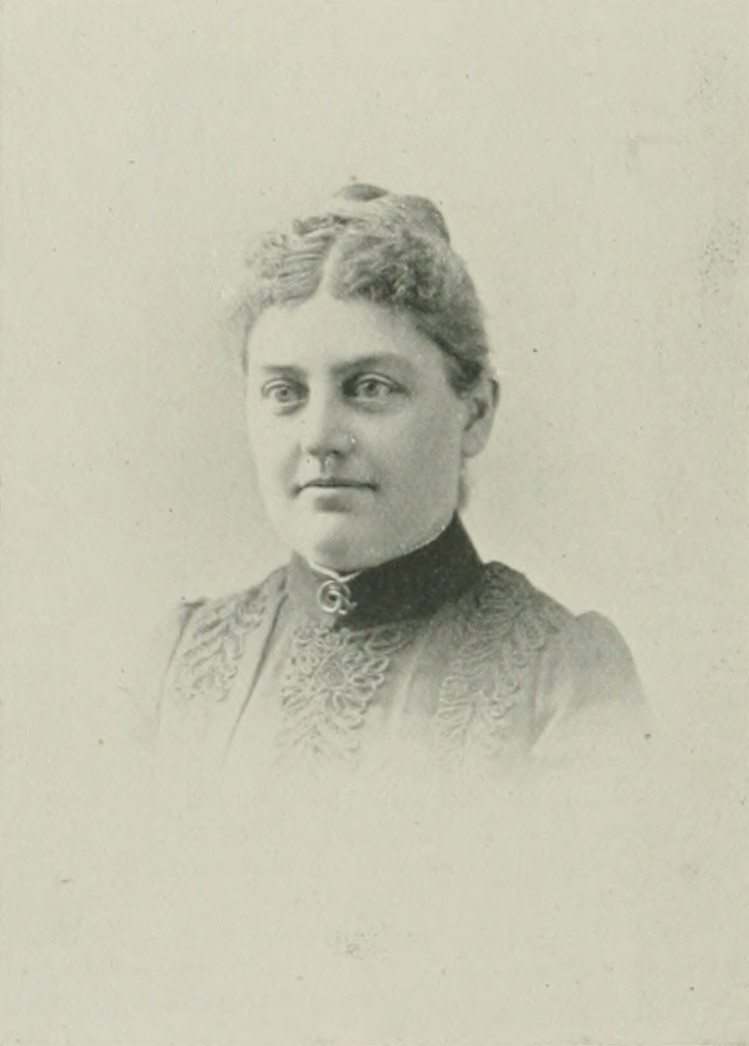
- "A Woman of the Century"
- Born: Mary Agnes Dalrymple; August 12, 1857; Springfield, Massachusetts, U.S.
- Died: June 14, 1934 (aged 76); Wollaston, Massachusetts, U.S.
- Occupations: journalist; newspaper editor; newspaper publisher
- Spouse: Frederick Herbert Bishop (m. 1889)
- Writing career
- Language: English

Mary Agnes Bishop (née Dalrymple; August 12, 1857 – June 14, 1934) was an American journalist, newspaper editor, and newspaper publisher. She was an accomplished linguist, and throughout her life, continued to study languages with various teachers.

== Early life and education ==
Mary Agnes Dalrymple was born in Springfield, Massachusetts on August 12, 1857. She was the only child of John Dalrymple and his wife, Frances Ann Hewitt. She was proud of her old Scotch ancestry and her ability to trace the family back from Scotland to France, where, early in the twelfth century, William de Darumpill obtained a papal dispensation to marry his first cousin, Anges Dalrymple, both of the Dalrymples of Lochinch, Stranraer, Scotland, a family whose head is the Earl of Stair. Her mother, Frances, was the daughter of Eli and Mary (Harwood) Hewitt, and a descendant of Peregrine White, son of William and Susan White, the Mayflower Pilgrims.

In local papers, her childhood poems were printed readily, but the reading of Horace Greeley's "Recollections of a Busy Life," in which he had some good advice for youthful writers, caused her to determine not to be tempted to allow her doggerel to be published. When she was less than two year old, her parents removed with her to Grafton, Massachusetts. Bishop was unusually precocious, and had learned to read when only four years old. Her talent for singing also developed early, and she was in constant demand as an entertainer.

She was instructed by private tutors. In 1865, she entered the graded school at Grafton, Massachusetts, and on leaving the high school in 1875 was the first girl to complete the classical course. At the age of sixteen years, while still a school girl, she became the local editor of the Grafton Herald.

== Career ==
=== Teacher ===
Although offered a scholarship at Wesleyan University, she decided to enter at once her chosen profession as a teacher, beginning the week following her graduation from high school. She taught in the public schools of Grafton and Sutton, Massachusetts for many years. During that time, she gave lectures quite frequently in the vicinity and often appeared in the home drama, making her greatest success as Lady Macbeth.

=== Writer ===
Her stories and poems were published by the Westborough Chronotype. She contributed botanical articles dealing with the flora of the section to the Worcester newspapers, and she was local correspondent for the Associated Press. As her writing became more widely known, her work appeared in The Youth's Companion, and other journals of nationwide circulation, never adopting a pen name, and rarely using her own name or initials.

=== Editor and publisher ===
In 1887, she was honored by the appointment as editor of the Massachusetts Ploughman (also known as The Massachusetts Plowman) of Boston (1840–1906), then considered the leading agricultural and farm authority. For several years, wrote for it fourteen columns of original matter each week, and selected contributed poems and stories for publication, beside doing other editorial work for its eight pages and reporting stenographically the farmers' meetings held under its auspices. The position offered her had never been taken by a woman, and, indeed, the work that she did was never attempted previously, for she had the charge of almost the entire journal from the first. A few months after she accepted the position, the proprietor died, and the entire paper was in her hands for six months. In the autumn, the paper was purchased by another owner, but the chief editorial work remained in her hands. The paper was enlarged from four to eight pages in the meantime and, as before, was published each week. Her best work for The Boston Globe was the history of Grafton, written on its 250th anniversary.

She was a member of the executive committee of the New England Woman's Press Association, of which she was one of the first members.

=== Affiliations ===
Always interested in equal suffrage, she registered with the first women voters. Another reform measure that interested her was the prohibition of the liquor traffic, and she was active as a member of the Women's Christian Temperance Union. During World War I, she was occupied with writing, knitting, and doing other work for the men in service, as a member of the Red Cross and the Hospital Aid Association. She was also a member of the District Nurse Association, the Day Nursery Association, Parents' and Teachers' Association, Women's City Club of Boston, Quincy Woman's Club, Wollaston Woman's Club, Professional Woman's Club, the Presidents' Club, the Washington American League of Penwomen, the New York Women's Press Club, and other organizations.

== Personal life ==
Her marriage to Frederick Herbert Bishop of Wollaston, Massachusetts, manager of the Universal Winding Company of Boston, took place at Grafton, September 21, 1889. Although she had no children of her own, she was a mother to Frederick's child by his first marriage, a son, Francis Herbert Bishop (b. 1886). Four additional other children were taken into the home: Grace Irene, Walter Howard Oliver, Miriam Nelson, and Virginia.

Bishop was interested in literature in general, and together with her husband, they engaged in literary pursuits. Their home was located on Wollaston Heights. After an illness of several weeks, she died at her home in Wollaston, June 14, 1934.
