= Poet Lore =

American literary magazine

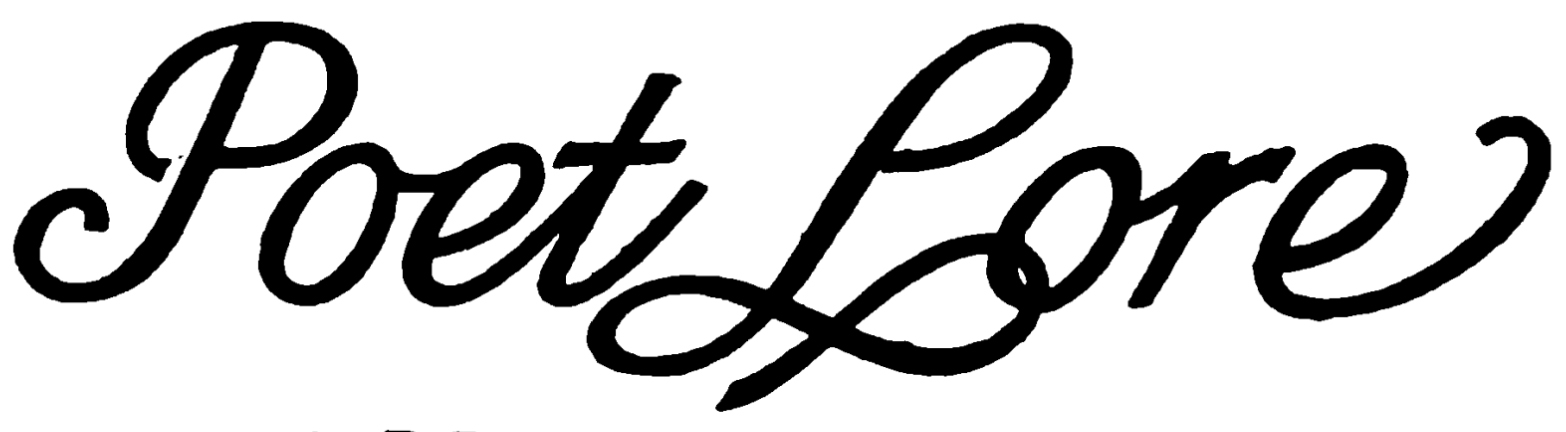
- Poet Lore logo from 1900
- Editors: Jody Bolz and E. Ethelbert Miller
- Reviews Editor: Martin Galvin
- Categories: Literary magazine
- Frequency: semi-annually
- Publisher: Writer's Center
- Founded: 1889
- Country: USA
- Based in: Bethesda, Maryland
- Language: English
- Website: www.poetlore.com
- ISSN: 0032-1966

Poet Lore is an English-language literary magazine based in Bethesda, Maryland.

Established in 1889 by Charlotte Porter and Helen Archibald Clarke, two progressive young Shakespeare scholars who believed in the evolutionary nature of literature, Poet Lore is the oldest continuously published poetry journal in the United States. Porter and Clarke, who were life partners as well as co-editors, launched the magazine as a forum on "Shakespeare, Browning, and the Comparative Study of Literature" but soon sought out the original work of living writers—featuring more drama than poetry at first, and moving beyond North America and Europe to publish in translation the work of writers from Asia, South America, and the Middle East. In its early decades, the magazine featured poetry by Rabindranath Tagore, Frederic Mistral, Rainier Maria Rilke, Stephane Mallarmé, and Paul Verlaine. The first translation of Chekhov's The Seagull appeared in its pages.

The magazine is currently published by the Writer's Center, a literary non-profit based near Washington, D.C. Its semi-annual issues include poetry by established and new writers, essays of interest to poets and readers, and reviews of new books of poetry.

== Contributors ==
In its first few decades, Poet Lore published the works of such renowned writers as Rabindranath Tagore, Rainer Maria Rilke, Paul Verlaine, Frederick Mistral, Stephane Mallarmé, Anton Chekhov, Maxim Gorky, Jose Echegaray, Hermann Hesse, Henrik Ibsen, August Strindberg, Emma Lazarus, and Sara Teasdale. Award-winning American poets whose early work (in some cases their first published poems) appeared in the pages of Poet Lore include Mary Oliver, Linda Pastan, Colette Inez, R. T. Smith, D. Nurkse, John Balaban, Carolyn Forché, Alice Fulton, Dana Gioia, Pablo Medina, Seán Mac Falls, Kim Addonizio, David Baker, Carl Phillips, Natasha Trethewey, Terrance Hayes, Dede Wilson, and Reginald Dwayne Betts.

== Bibliography ==
- Poet Lore. Vol. 4. Writer's Center. 1892.
