= Preston Ware Orem =

American composer and pianist (1865–1938)

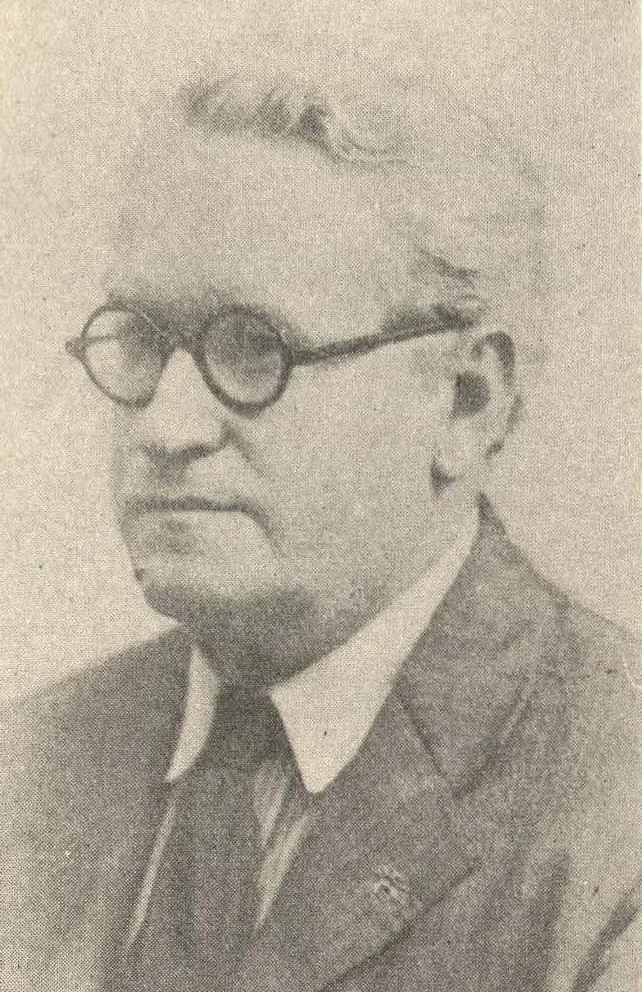

Preston Ware Orem (April 20, 1865 – December 20, 1938) was an American composer, pianist, and writer on music. He is frequently grouped with other composers as part of the Indianist movement in American music.

== Early life ==
Born in Philadelphia, Orem received his secondary education at the Eastburn Academy, and did his undergraduate work at the University of Pennsylvania, where he received his degree in music. He studied organ and music theory with Hugh Archibald Clarke, and was instructed in piano by Charles H. Jarvis.

== Career ==
From 1889 until 1895 he served as the organist of St. Paul's Procathedral in Los Angeles; after this he returned home, teaching for one year at the Philadelphia Conservatory. From 1896 until 1905 he taught at the Combs Conservatory of Music. In 1900 Orem began a long association with Theodore Presser, serving as a music critic and editor for the publisher while conducting the Presser Choral Society.

From 1901 until 1910 he again worked as an organist, this time at the Walnut Street Presbyterian Church. Orem also wrote theory books, including 1919's Harmony Book for Beginners, and compiled nine books of musical exercises. It is for these that he is chiefly remembered.

As a composer, Orem was less interested than many of his contemporaries in the Indianist movement; still, as it was in fashion, it seems to have held a certain fascination for him. He is numbered among its members mainly because of his American Indian Rhapsody, his most popular work. Originally written for piano, but later scored for full orchestra, it contains reference to the music of the Cheyenne, Kiowa, Sioux, Chippewa, Pueblo, and Cree tribes, and is based on themes recorded and suggested by Thurlow Lieurance. The Rhapsody has been described as

very much a period piece, stylistically conventional and eclectic, post-Romantic and neo-Lisztian in its mannerisms and pretentiousness, its plethora of trills, arpeggios, broken chords, and repeated octaves (often thunderous), and its bravura display of virtuosity, with indications ranging from molto maestoso to allegretto scherzando, from andante affetuoso to allegro con brio, from amabile to feroce (the savage!). It is probably the most far-out Indianist composition ever written.

Orem composed other works as well, including a piano quartet, a quintet, large numbers of songs, some works for piano, and numerous transcriptions and arrangements; among the latter is a movement from one of Johann Sebastian Bach's solo cello suites, arranged for organ. Orem died in Philadelphia in 1938.

A handful of Orem's piano works have been recorded by Naxos Records for release on the Marco Polo label, as part of a series documenting the work of Indianist composers. In addition, the piano version of the American Indian Rhapsody may be found on a New World Records release of American romantic piano music.

Orem was credited by the Clayton F. Summy Company in 1935 with co-authoring the Happy Birthday song.
