= Marion A. McBride =

American journalist and clubwoman

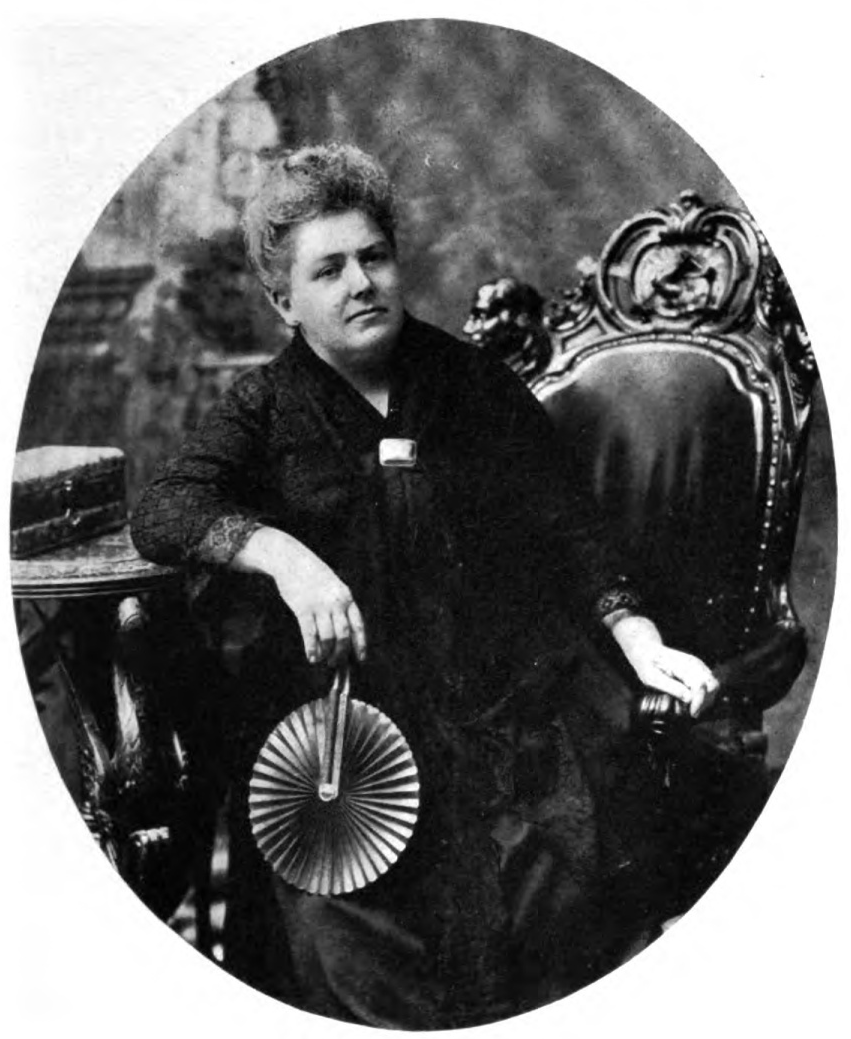
- Born: Marion A. Snow; January 5, 1850; Easthampton, Massachusetts
- Died: September 18, 1909 (aged 59); Arlington Heights, Massachusetts
- Resting place: Williamsburg, Massachusetts
- Occupations: Journalist and clubwoman
- Children: James D. McBride

Marion A. McBride, also spelled MacBride (January 5, 1850 – September 18, 1909), was an American journalist and clubwoman. She founded several women's press associations, most notably the New England Woman's Press Association. She wrote and lectured on domestic science, and was active in charitable causes and local politics. It was largely due to McBride's activism that the state of Massachusetts began hiring matrons for city police stations and built a separate facility for female inmates in Boston.

== Biography ==
Marion A. McBride (née Snow) was born on January 5, 1850, in Easthampton, Massachusetts, the only child of Joseph Preston Snow. She was educated in New York, but spent most of her life in the Boston area.

=== Journalism career ===
She began her career at the New-York Tribune before taking a job in 1880 as a special editorial writer for The Boston Post . She was a reporter and correspondent for the Boston Post from 1881 to 1885. After leaving the Post she worked as a freelance writer, contributing regularly to The Boston Globe, the New York Herald, the New Orleans Picayune, the Cleveland Plain Dealer, the Northampton Herald & Post, the Chicago Inter Ocean, and the St. Louis Chronicle. She headed a department of American Art, and wrote articles about domestic science for The Decorator and Furnisher, The New England Magazine, and other periodicals.

At the World Cotton Centennial in 1884, McBride was superintendent of the press for the woman's department. While she was there, working with women of the press from all over the country, she organized the National Woman's Press Association (NWPA). Within two years the NWPA had evolved into the International Woman's Press Association. The organization spawned several local chapters, including the Illinois Woman's Press Association, the Ohio Woman's Press Association, the Southern Woman's Press Association, and the New England Woman's Press Association (NEWPA). McBride initiated the founding of NEWPA in 1885. At the time, newspaper women were still a rarity; one 1887 Boston Globe headline referred to the women of NEWPA as "lady newspaper men."

=== Police matron bill ===
Her Boston Globe obituary suggests that she was best remembered in Boston for her work with "Mrs. Charpiot's home for intemperate women," and for her work on the police matron bill. Starting in November 1886, McBride led a campaign to hire matrons to work in Boston's police stations. By May 1887, the Massachusetts legislature had passed a bill to appoint police matrons in all Massachusetts cities, and establish a house of detention for women in Boston. Massachusetts was the first state to pass such a law.

=== Charitable and other activities ===
In the early 1880s, McBride organized the first Woman's Department at the annual New England Manufacturers' and Mechanics' Institute fair in Boston. She also headed the Woman's Department of the Massachusetts Charitable Mechanic Association. She was a national superintendent of the Woman's Christian Temperance Union, and served for many years as secretary of the Woman's Charity Club. She was a member of the National League of American Pen Women, the Rumford Historical Association, the Daughters of the American Revolution, the New England Helping Hand Society, and other civic and charitable organizations.

In 1888, McBride read a paper titled "Women in Journalism" at the International Council of Women in Washington, D.C.

She died at her home on Hillside Avenue in Arlington Heights, Massachusetts, on September 18, 1909. Her obituary cites "Paralysis" as the cause of death. She was survived by a son, James McBride, who worked as a naval architect at the Fore River Shipyard in Quincy. Among those who attended her funeral in Arlington Heights were members of the WCTU, NEWPA, DAR, and the Home for Intemperate Women. She was buried in the family lot in Williamsburg, Massachusetts.
