= Helen A. Clarke =

American literary critic, book editor, composer and lyricist

- Born: November 13, 1860; Philadelphia, Pennsylvania, U.S.
- Died: February 8, 1926 (aged 65); Boston, Massachusetts, U.S.
- Education: University of Pennsylvania
- Occupations: Literary critic; book editor; composer; lyricist
- Known for: Co-founding Poet Lore

Helen Archibald Clarke (November 13, 1860 – February 8, 1926) was an American literary critic, book editor, composer and lyricist, and the co-founder of the journal Poet Lore. She was influential in shaping the American literary taste of her day through her work on Poet Lore, through her work co-editing the complete works of the British poets Robert Browning and Elizabeth Barrett Browning, and through her books on writers such as Nathaniel Hawthorne and Henry Wadsworth Longfellow.

== Early life and education ==
Helen Archibald Clarke was born in 1860 in Philadelphia, Pennsylvania, to Jane Maria Searle and Hugh Archibald Clarke. Her father was a composer and music professor at the University of Pennsylvania, and Clarke showed early aptitude for music herself. At the time, the university did not admit women, but Clarke attended for two years as a special student, earning a certificate in music in 1883.

In the early 1880s, Clarke submitted an article on music in the work of William Shakespeare to the journal Shakespeariana, then under the editorship of Charlotte Endymion Porter (1857–1942). Clarke and Porter became life partners and collaborated on a number of literary projects during the remainder of Clarke's life.

== Poet Lore ==
In 1889, Clarke and Porter founded the quarterly journal Poet Lore in Philadelphia, later moving it to Boston. Its stated aim was to champion the "comparative study of literature" and the work of Shakespeare and Robert Browning. After the first few years, the journal's focus on writing about Shakespeare and Browning shifted to encompass a broader view of world literature. In keeping with its mission, the magazine published few American writers but many from around the world, often in translation. Poet Lore helped introduce American readers to the work of such early modern writers as Henrik Ibsen, August Strindberg, Gabriele D'Annunzio, Selma Lagerlöf, Gerhart Hauptmann, Maxim Gorky, Maurice Maeterlinck, Arthur Schnitzler, and Rabindranath Tagore.

Porter and Clarke sold Poet Lore in 1903 but continued for many years as editors. Poet Lore is still in print, the oldest continuing poetry magazine in the United States.

== Authorship ==
Clarke co-edited (with Porter) editions of the complete works of Robert Browning and Elizabeth Barrett Browning. She wrote several books about Browning and about American writers like Nathaniel Hawthorne and Henry Wadsworth Longfellow. Together with Porter, she published Clever Tales (1897), a book of translations of European authors like Villiers de L'Isle Adam, Ludovic Halévy, Vsevolod Garshin, Jakub Arbes, and Strindberg.

She also wrote cantatas and operettas for children, as well as the lyrics for Gethsemane, a choral rhapsody by the composer Gustav Strube. In 1899, her stage version of Robert Browning's Pippa Passes was produced in Boston.

Clarke was a member of several societies in the Boston area, including the Boston Browning Society and the Boston Authors Club, and part of the founding coalition of the American Music Society of Boston

Clarke died in Boston in 1926.

== Books ==
As author

- Apparitions (1892; songs)
- Study Programmes: Robert Browning (1900, with Porter)
- Shakespeare Studies: Macbeth (1901, with Porter)
- Browning's Italy (1907)
- Browning's England (1908)
- A Child's Guide to Mythology (1908)
- Longfellow's Country (1909)
- Hawthorne's Country (1910)
- The Poets' New England (1911)
- Browning and His Century (1912)
- Shakespeare Study Programs: The Comedies (1914, with Porter)

As translator

- Clever Tales (1897, with Porter)

As editor

- Browning, Robert. The Complete Works of Robert Browning. New York: Kelmscott Society and Thos. Y. Crowell, 1898 (with Porter; 12 volumes)
- Browning, Elizabeth Barrett. Works: The Complete Works of Elizabeth Barrett Browning. New York: Thos. Y. Crowell, 1900 (with Porter; 6 volumes)
