= National Woman's Press Association =

The National Woman's Press Association (1884-?), or NWPA, was an American professional association for women journalists.

== History ==
The NWPA was founded on May 13, 1884, at the World Cotton Centennial in New Orleans, Louisiana. Its aim was not only to be of practical assistance to newspaper writers, but ultimately, "to advance the interest of all professional, business, and working women of every grade."

The association was founded by Marion A. McBride, a journalist with The Boston Post who was serving as superintendent of the press for the Women's Department. McBride planned to model its organization on that of the Woman's Christian Temperance Union (W.C.T.U.), with every state in the union represented. The first president was Eliza Jane Nicholson, publisher of the New Orleans Picayune. Vice presidents were Lilla Stone Pavy of the Missouri Republican, Florence M. Adkinson of the Chicago Inter Ocean and the Indianapolis Sentinel, and Mary McMillen of the Anglo American. McBride was the first secretary. By 1885 the association had over 300 members.

Regional chapters included the Illinois Woman's Press Association (still in existence), the New England Woman's Press Association, the Missouri Woman's Press Association, the Indiana Woman's Press Association, the Ohio Woman's Press Association, and the Southern Woman's Press Association. NWPA became an international association in 1887.

== Notable people ==
- Florence M. Adkinson
- Ada Iddings Gale
- Marion A. McBride
- Mary McMillen
- Eliza Jane Nicholson
- Lilla Stone Pavy
- Mary Smith Lockwood

== See also ==
- National Federation of Press Women, est. 1937
