= Adelaide Cilley Waldron =

American author, editor, clubwoman (1843–1909)

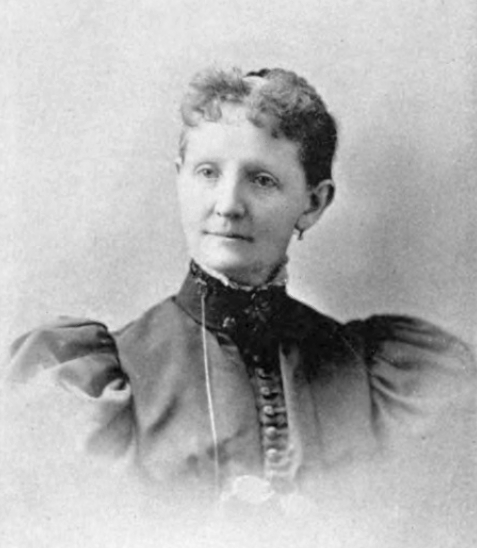
- Born: Adelaide Haines Cilley; February 23, 1843; Manchester, New Hampshire, U.S.
- Died: June 16, 1909 (aged 66); Farmington, New Hampshire, U.S.
- Occupations: author and editor
- Spouse(s): R. C Parker (m. 1862; died 1866) John Waldron (m. 1871)
- Relatives: Joseph Cilley (great-grandfather)
- Writing career
- Pen name: A. C. Waldron
- Genres: poems, hymns, sonnets, children's stories, essays, letters, articles

Adelaide Cilley Waldron (née, Cilley; pen name, A. C. Waldron; February 23, 1843 – June 16, 1909) was an American author and editor of the long nineteenth century. She wrote poems, hymns, sonnets, children's stories, essays, and letters for newspapers, as well as articles for educational and historical journals. Farmington was published in 1904. Waldron was an accomplished musician and a clubwoman. She was associated with the Daughters of the American Revolution (DAR), Woman's Christian Temperance Union (WCTU), New England Woman's Press Association (NEWPA), and other organizations.

== Early life and education ==
Adelaide Haines Cilley was born in Manchester, New Hampshire, February 23, 1843. She was the daughter of the Rev. Daniel Plumer Cilley and his wife, Adelaide Ayers (Haines) Cilley. In addition to the Plumers and Cilleys, Waldron's ancestors included the Frosts, Sherburnes, and Pepperells of colonial note, through her mother, a preceptress in the Parsonsfield, Maine, and Strafford Academies. Waldron had at least four siblings, including Charles, Emma, Daniel, and Joseph.

Removal during her childhood to Boston, Massachusetts, caused Waldron to be educated almost wholly in that city, through schools, private tutors, and her father's study full of books.

== Career ==
"I may find it provoking when seven out of ten of my weekly papers have the same serial, or short story, or extracts from special correspondence, but perhaps the family next door has only one weekly and no daily paper; surely the well-written articles bought by a good syndicate are better for my neighbor's instruction and amusement than would be the trash possibly served to him otherwise." -Adelaide Cilley Waldron, 1888

Since her first poem appeared, in Lippincott's Magazine, while she lived in North Carolina, her work was printed in many periodicals, from Harper's Magazine, Good Housekeeping, The Writer, The New England Magazine, Frank Leslie's Sunday Magazine, Outing, The Literary World, Demorest Monthly Magazine, Kate Field's Washington, The Youth's Companion, American Primary Teacher, and The Granite Monthly, to first-class daily papers, and by publishers of holiday books, as well as in A Collection of Poems by America's Younger Poets. Waldron, lacking the aggressiveness of many less gifted, was a woman of unusual abilities and versatile talent, writing well always, whether in verse for special occasion, a hymn, a strong sonnet, a story for children, letters for newspapers, or articles carefully compiled for educational and historical journals, including the Journal of Education (Boston: New England Publishing Company). As a writer, she never lowered her standard for popularity or pay.

For ten years, she served as organist to Richard Pinkham of the Congregational church.

== Personal life and death ==
She married R. C Parker, M. D., of Farmington, New Hampshire, May 1, 1862. He died December 31, 1866.

Her marriage to John Waldron, Esq., of Farmington, took place August 15, 1871. They had two daughters: Adelaide Cecil and Elizabeth Pearl.

Waldron was a charter member of the DAR, a state officer of the WCTU, and served as vice-president of the New Hampshire branch of the Sons of the Revolution. She belonged to the club of NHD, the NEWPA, and the Pascataqua Congregational Club. She was also a member of the Daughters of the Cincinnati, her great-grandfather, General Joseph Cilley, having been one of the founders of the Society of the Cincinnati in 1783. She was a donor to the library of the New England Historic Genealogical Society.

Waldron died in Farmington, June 16, 1909.

== Selected works ==
- Farmington, 1904
