= Lavinia S. Goodwin =

American author and educator

- Born: February 4, 1833; St. Johnsbury, Vermont, U.S.
- Died: 1911 (aged 77–78)
- Education: State Seminary, Derby, Vermont, U.S.
- Occupations: author; educator
- Spouse: E. W. Goodwin

Lavinia S. Goodwin (February 4, 1833 – 1911) was an American author and educator of the long nineteenth century. She was a charter member of the New England Woman's Press Association.

== Biography ==
Lavinia (sometimes spelled, "Lavina") Stella Tyler was born in St. Johnsbury, Vermont, February 4, 1833. Her parents were James P. and Philura (Crocker) Tyler. In King's Chapel Burying Ground, Boston, is the grave of an ancestor marked by a stone from a foreign quarry, dating back to the Colonial period and bearing the coat of arms of the English Tyler family.

She was educated in public and private schools and the State Seminary, Derby, Vermont.

From childhood, she was an earnest reader and an ambitious student, as well as a lover of nature and replete with physical activity. While very young, her habit of whispering "made-up" stories to herself on her nightly pillow furnished amusement to older listeners. From sensitiveness on the point, her earliest writings were either destroyed or sedulously concealed, until finally, some pieces of verse that accidentally fell under a friendly eye were forwarded to a city newspaper and published without her knowledge.

When between fourteen and fifteen years old, she taught a district school, and for a few years until her marriage, was alternately teacher and pupil. Circumstances developed Goodwin's literary talent in the direction of versatility rather than specialty.

Since an early marriage to E. W. Goodwin, she resided in Boston and was constantly connected with the press. She was a contributor to the Great Republic monthly in 1859. After having conducted departments for women and children, and become favorably known as a writer of stories, at the beginning of 1869, she was made associate editor of The Watchman (Boston), in especial charge of its family page. The affiliation was re-established after an interval of service on the Journal of Education. In 1887, when Georgia A. Peck, editor of the Boston Commonwealth left on vacation, she left Goodwin in charge of the publication.

A season in California and Mexico tested her ability as a correspondent, and she was employed in that capacity in the Philadelphia Centennial Exposition (1876) and in the Paris Exposition Universelle (1878), her published letters winning general admiration. She produced a number of serials, one for a leading London journal. The House We Live In was an 1893 children's serial for Our Little Men and Women focused on "our heads, hands and the rest of us" while not like studying physiology.

Goodwin's volumes included, Little Folks' Own (collection of stories and verse, which had a large sale); The Little Helper (biography); The mysterious Miner; Quicksands; The Light of Home; and Wings, Legs and Voices. Her books were published in the U.S. and England. Besides contributing much to various popular publications for young people, she gained recognition in art and general literature. As a writer of poetry she was represented in many anthologies. Goodwin was a charter member of the New England Woman's Press Association.

Lavinia Stella Goodwin died in 1911.

== Selected works ==
=== Books ===
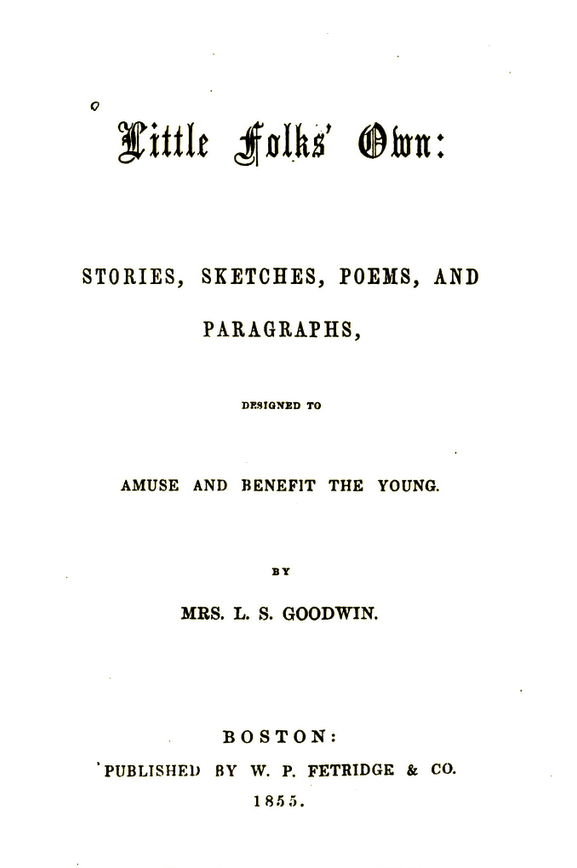
Little folks' own (1855)

- Little folks' own : stories, sketches, poems, and paragraphs, designed to amuse and benefit the young (1855)
- The Little Helper: a memoir of F.A. Caswell (with Florence Annie Caswell; 1867)
- The mysterious miner: or, The gold-diggers of California. : A story of the Atlantic and Pacific shores. (1864)
- The gambler's fate : or, The dove of sacrifice, a story of California (1864)
- Vultures; or, The secret of a birth. A story of Boston. (1866)
- Quicksands
- The Light of Home
- Wings, Legs and Voices

=== Serials ===
- The House We Live In

=== Articles ===
- "Ship Of The Desert" (Current, 1885)
- "Head-dresses Of A Century Ago" (1886)
- "The Ethics of Suicide" (The Boston Globe, 1888)

=== Short stories ===
- "An Odd Mistake" (Our Little Ones, 1891)
- "Better Than She Knew"

=== Poetry ===
- "A Corner in Art" (1885)
- "Sonnet at Pisa" (The Current, 1885)
- "A Boy's Call" (Wide Awake, 1893)
- "Tapping" (The Youth's Companion, 1898)
- "When It Is Finished" (The Youth's Companion, 1902)
