= Gustav Strube =

American classical composer

Gustav Strube (3 March 1867 – 2 February 1953) was a German-born conductor and composer. He was the founding conductor of the Baltimore Symphony Orchestra in 1916, and taught at the Peabody Conservatory. He wrote two operas, Ramona, which premiered in 1916, and The Captive, which premiered at the Lyric Theatre in Baltimore in February 1938. He was also a member of Baltimore's famous Saturday Night Club with H. L. Mencken.

Strube was born in the Harz Mountains of Ballenstadt in 1867 and came from a musically gifted family. By the age of 10, Strube was in his father's symphony, and at the age of 16 he entered the Leipzig Conservatory. Strube used to earn pocket money by making dance music for Saturday night dance parties. Upon graduation he entered the Gewandhaus Orchestra, and played under Johann Strauss, the younger, while teaching at the Mannheim Conservatory. In 1889 Strube and conductor Artur Nikisch immigrated to the United States to play in the Boston Symphony Orchestra, he said.

Strube played in the Boston Symphony Orchestra for 23 years, and eventually became concert maestro. Strube was one of the first conductors of the Boston Pops, formed because of the success of "march master" John Philip Sousa, according to the Boston Pops Homepage.

He was a National Patron of Delta Omicron, an international professional music fraternity.

Composition manuscripts, personal photographs, concert programs, and newspaper features are in the holdings of the Gustav Strube Collection at the Peabody Institute Archives in Baltimore, MD. http://musiclibrary.peabody.jhu.edu/content.php?pid=225964&sid=1871497

== Selected works ==
Opera

- Ramona (1916)
- The Captive (1938)

Orchestra

- Lorelei (symphonic poem)
- Narcissus and Echo (Malfilâtre) (symphonic poem)
- A Peace Overture (1945)
- Puck (1910, comedy overture)
- Sinfonietta (little symphony)
- Symphonic Prologue
- Symphony in B minor (1910)
- Eine Walpurgisnacht (symphonic poem)
- Gethsemane (symbolic rhapsody; lyrics by Helen A. Clarke)

Concertante

- Longing for viola and orchestra (1905); after the poem by William Lyman Johnson; dedicated to and premiered by Émile Férir with the Boston Symphony Orchestra
- Fantastic Dance for viola and orchestra (1906); dedicated to and premiered by Émile Férir with the Boston Symphony Orchestra
- Concerto in F♯ minor for violin and orchestra (1907)
- Concerto in B minor for violin and orchestra (1927)
- Concerto for violin and orchestra (1943)
- Élégie for cello and orchestra (1907)
- Romance in B♭ major for violin and orchestra (1903)

Chamber music

- Berceuse for viola and piano (1908)
- Elegy and Serenade for string quartet (with double bass ad libitum) or string orchestra, Op.9 (1902)
- Concertino in D major for violin and piano (1909)
- Legato, Tempo di Valse for piano (1902)
- Mirages, 6 Pieces for violin and piano (1914)
- Rêverie in A minor for violin and piano (1906)
- Sonata in E minor for violin and piano (1924)
- Sonata in D minor for viola and piano (1925)
- Sonatina for viola and Piano (1943)
- Ein Tanz (A Dance) in D minor for violin and piano (1906)
- Trio for violin, cello and piano (1928)
- Two Pictures for violin and piano (1924)
- Vier kleine Stimmungsbilder (Four Little Mood-Pictures) for violin and piano (1908)
1. Abendglocken (Sunset Chimes)
2. Mondscheinzauber (Magic Moonlight)
3. Ein Märchen (A Fairy Tale)
4. Morgen (Morning)
