= Helen M. Winslow =

American journalist

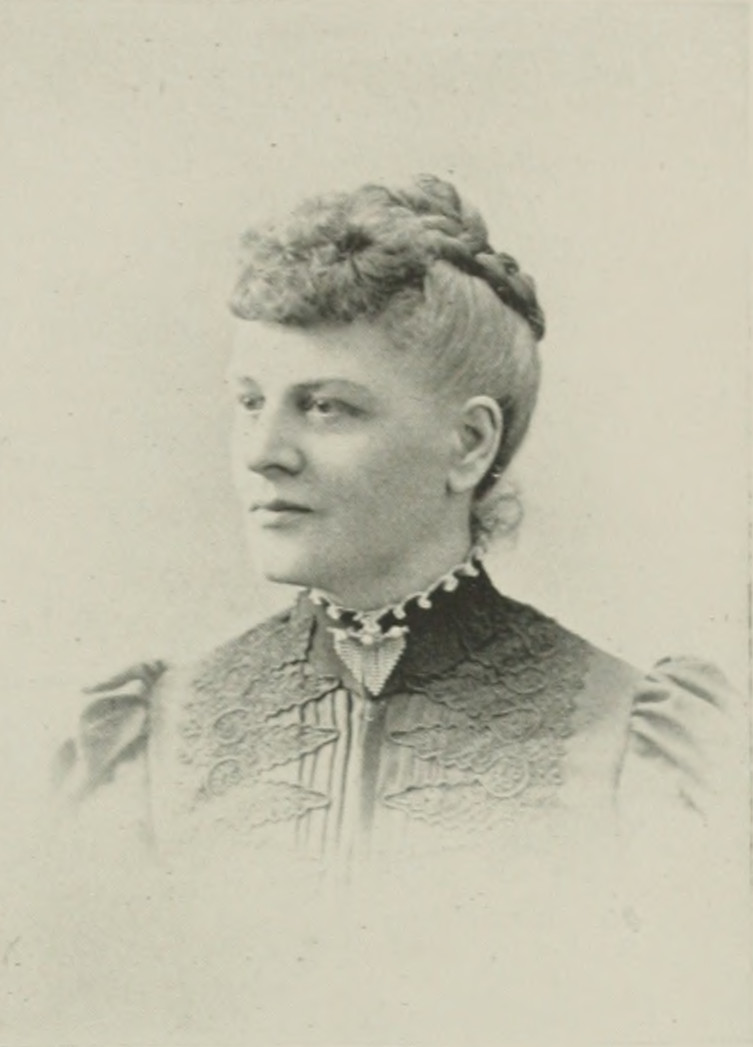
- Portrait photo from A Woman of the Century
- Born: April 13, 1851; Westfield, Vermont, U.S.
- Died: March 27, 1938 (aged 86); Shirley, Massachusetts, U.S.
- Resting place: Center Cemetery, Shirley, Massachusetts
- Occupations: editor, author, publisher, journalist
- Relatives: Edward Winslow
- Writing career
- Pen name: Aunt Philury
- Language: English

Helen M. Winslow (pen name, Aunt Philury; April 13, 1851 – March 27, 1938) was an American editor, author, publisher, and journalist. She began her work on Boston papers. Winslow served as dramatic editor on The Beacon, 1891–97; editor, Woman's Club Department, Boston Transcript, 1893–98; editor, Woman's Club Department of the Delineator, 1897, and again 1912; editor and publisher, The Club Woman, 1897-1904; and she was the publisher of the Official Register of Women's Clubs in America from 1897. She was the author of Salome Sheppard, Reformer. 1893; Concerning Cats, 1900; Concerning Polly, 1902; Literary Boston or To-day, 1902; The Woman of To-morrow, 1905; The President of Quex, 1906; Peggy at Spinster Farm, 1908; A Woman for Mayor, 1910; The Pleasuring of Susan Smith, 1912; and At the Sign of the Town Pump, 1913. She collaborated with Frances Willard in Occupations for Women, and with Marie Wright in Picturesque Mexico.

== Early life and education ==
Helen Maria Winslow was born in Westfield, Vermont, April 13, 1851. She was in the ninth generation of descent from Kenelm Winslow, a brother of Governor Edward Winslow, of the Plymouth Colony. Her great-grandmother Winslow was Abigail Adams. In her infancy, her family removed to Greenfield, Massachusetts, and afterwards to St. Albans, Vermont, where her father, Don Avery Winslow (1824–1902), was a leader in musical circles. He was a musical composer of note and a member of the first English opera company organized in the United States. The mother, Mary F. (Newton) Winslow (died 1882), was a scholar, a linguist and a poet. Winslow's siblings included, Edward W. (drowned in early youth), Mary A., Isabel N., and Harriet P. After the father's second marriage in 1886, Amanda became Winslow's stepmother.

Winslow was educated at the Vermont Academy and State Normal schools, with special studies in languages and literature in Boston.

== Career ==
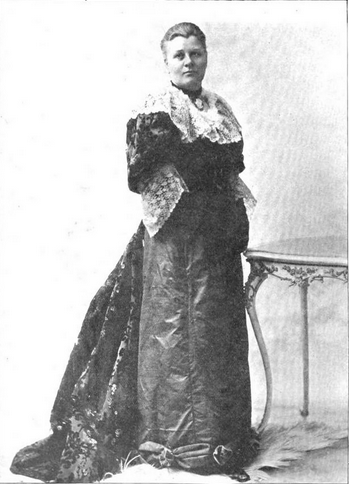
Helen M. Winslow (1897)

Winslow became a writer early in life, sometimes using the pen name, "Aunt Philury". She published her "Aunt Philury Papers" first, which was followed by the story, "Jack," both of which were well received. After her mother's death and her father's remarriage, Winslow went to Boston, living in the Roxbury District with her three sisters. Her first serial story, "The Shawsheen Mills," was published in the Yankee Blade. In 1886, she published "A Bohemian Chapter" as a serial in the Boston Beacon, a story telling of the struggles of a woman artist in Boston. In addition to traditional stories, Winslow also wrote poetry. Many of her poems were devoted to nature.

As a journalist, she served first on the Boston Transcript, and later, she became one of the regular staff of the Boston Advertiser, doing work at the same time for the Boston Saturday Evening Gazette. Besides doing work on almost every Boston daily, The Christian Union, Christian at Work, Interior, Drake's Magazine, Demorest's Magazine, the Arena, Journal of Education, Wide Awake, Youth's Companion, Cottage Hearth, and other periodicals were mediums through which she addressed the public. Her work covered a wide range.

Winslow served as commissioner from Massachusetts to the Cotton States and International Exposition of Atlanta, 1893; director of Board of Trustees of the Frances Willard Hospital, Bedford, Massachusetts; and State regent of the Massachusetts Daughters of the American Revolution, 1901–02. She served as treasurer of the New England Woman's Press Association, and was one of its six founders. She was also the ideator of the Boston Authors Club; and served as vice-president of the Press League.

Winslow lectured before many women's clubs and societies. She was a member of The National Society of the Colonial Dames of America, the Ex-Club of Boston, Pioneer Workers, the Lyceum Club of England, Professional Woman's Club, the Daughters of Vermont, Roxburghe Club, and the Altrurian Club.

== Personal life ==
In religion, she was a Congregationalist. Winslow died March 27, 1938, in Shirley, Massachusetts, and was buried in Center Cemetery in Shirley.

== Selected works ==
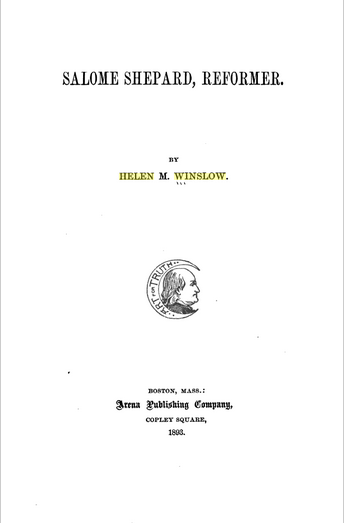
Salome Shepard: Reformer (1893)

- Salome Shepard, Reformer, 1893
- Concerning Cats, 1900
- Concerning Polly, 1902
- Literary Boston or To-day, 1902
- The Woman of To-morrow, 1905
- The President of Quex, 1906
- Peggy at Spinster Farm, 1908
- A Woman for Mayor, 1910
- The Pleasuring of Susan Smith, 1912
- At the Sign of the Town Pump, 1913
