= Sacred Heart Schools (Chicago) =

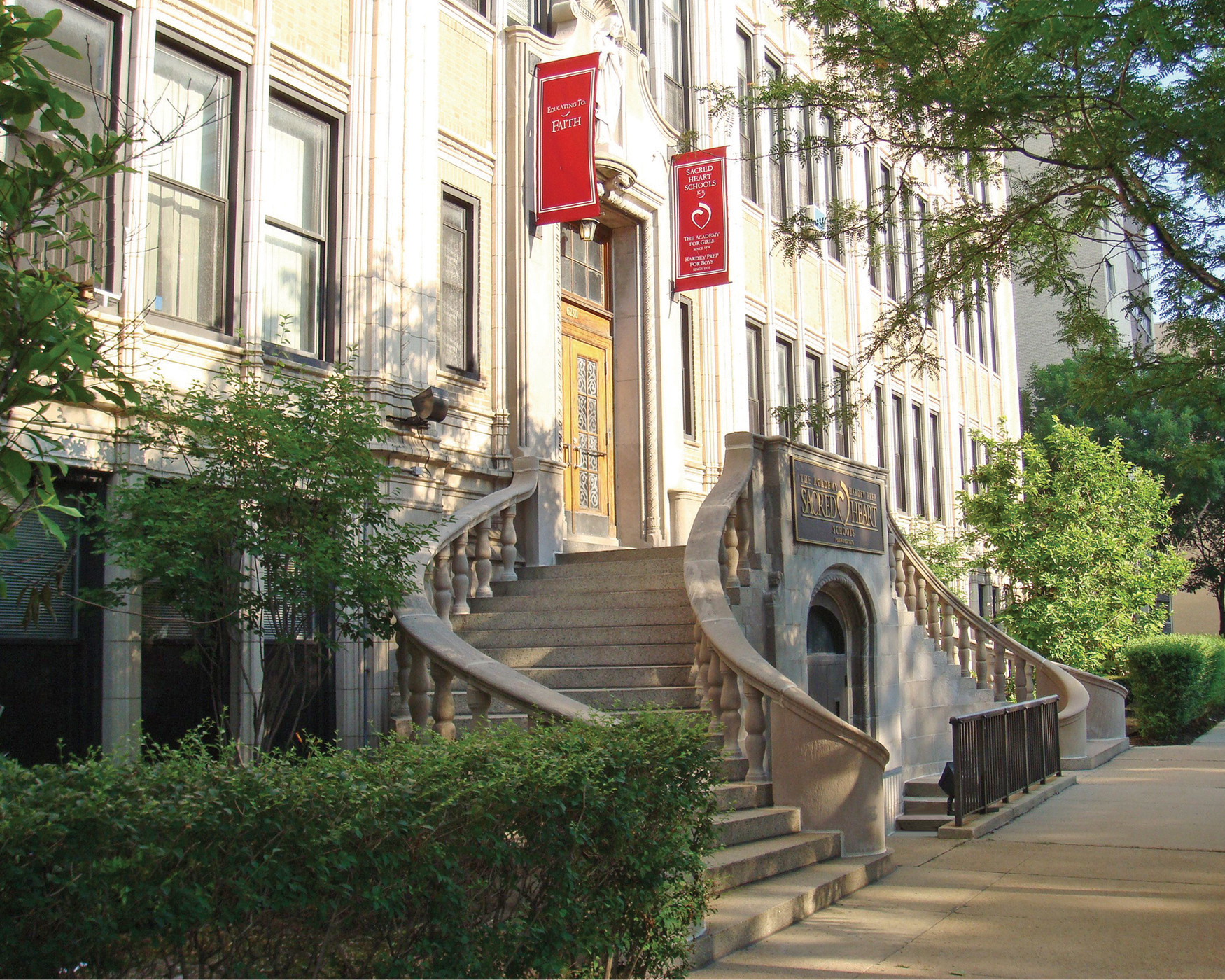

Location
- 6250 North Sheridan Road; Chicago, Illinois 60660; United States; 41°59′44.3″N 87°39′21.7″W

Information
- Other name: SHS
- Type: Independent school
- Religious affiliation: Roman Catholic
- Established: 1876; 150 years ago
- Founder: Society of the Sacred Heart
- Head of school: Meg Steele
- Grades: PK–8
- Song: Coeur de Jésus
- Team name: Academy: Wildcats; Hardey: Falcons
- Affiliation: National Association of Independent Schools
- Website: www.shschicago.org

Sacred Heart Schools is a PK–8 independent Catholic school in Chicago, Illinois, that admits students of all faiths. It was established in 1876 in the city and today is part of a global network of Sacred Heart schools.

== Athletics ==
Sacred Heart Schools offers a variety of sports in the fall, winter, and spring seasons. There are around 42 teams that compete throughout the year. Students can participate in various skill levels of golf, cross country, track and field, volleyball, flag football, and basketball.

The students play and compete against children from schools from the Chicago Archdiocese. Also offered is Biddy Basketball, a youth basketball program for students in grades K-3. It is an eight-week program.

The school's mascots are the Academy Wildcats and Hardey Falcons.

The athletic director of the school is Margot DiMuzio.

== Notable alumni ==
- Thomas Campbell, academic, educator and former politician
- Alexi Giannoulias, financier and politician
- Neil Hartigan, Illinois Democrat, served as Illinois Attorney General, the 40th Lieutenant Governor and a judge of the Illinois Appellate Court
- Brad Thor, thriller novelist
