= Boston Authors Club =

American literary organization

Boston Authors Club (sometimes Boston Authors' Club) is an American literary society founded in Boston, Massachusetts, in 1899.

In November 1899, Helen M. Winslow first evolved the idea of the Boston Authors Club. After talking with May Alden Ward and Mabel Loomis Todd, who urged her to carry out the project, she went to see Julia Ward Howe. "Go ahead!" said Howe. "Call some people together here, at my house, and we will form a club, and it will be a good one too." A meeting was held on November 24 at Howe's house, Ward, Winslow, Jacob Strauss, Hezekiah Butterworth, and Herbert Ward attending. It was voted to form the Boston Authors Club, and at a second meeting in December, the club was duly organized. In January 1900, the Authors' Club made its first public appearance in a meeting and dinner at Hotel Vendôme, Mrs. Howe presiding, Colonel Higginson (whom she described as her 'chief Vice') beside her.

The organization gives out the Julia Ward Howe Award.
