= Mary Elizabeth Blake =

American writer

Mary Elizabeth McGrath Blake (September 1, 1840 – February 26, 1907) was an Irish-American poet.

== Early years and education ==
Mary Elizabeth McGrath was born in Dungarvan, Ireland, and died in Boston, Massachusetts. The eldest daughter of Patrick McGrath, a stone mason, and Mary (Murphy) McGrath. In 1850, her family emigrated to the United States and settled in Quincy, Massachusetts. Her father was well-read and opened a successful marble works, thus, following her graduation from Quincy High School, was able to send his daughter to George Barrell Emerson's Private School in Boston from 1859 to 1861 and Academy of the Sacred Heart in Manhattanville, New York from 1861 to 1863 to study music and modern languages.

== Career ==
She worked as a schoolteacher prior to her June 1865 marriage to Dr. John G. Blake, a graduate of Harvard Medical School who had admired her published poems before they met in person. They had eleven children; of the six that survived into adulthood, five boys graduated from Harvard University and one daughter graduated from Radcliffe College.

She became widely published in such Boston publications as The Boston Gazette, The Boston Transcript, and The Boston Journal, the latter of which featured her popular series of "Rambling Talks". A devout Catholic, she was also frequently published in religious publications like Catholic World and The Congregationalist (a Protestant publication) and in such national publications as Scribner's. She wrote poetry to commemorate Boston memorials and events, including the deaths of abolitionist Wendell Phillips and Admiral David Dixon Porter, the Silver Jubilee of Archbishop John Joseph Williams, and the 150th anniversary of the Charitable Irish Society of Boston.

Her admirers included Theodore Roosevelt and Oliver Wendell Holmes, the latter of whom wrote of her "You are one of the birds that must sing."

An inveterate traveller, she created an image that a housewife must not stop to think of her responsibilities. "The stay-at-home weight will be so overwhelming in a proportion that she could not be propelled away by anything short of a catapult." Her first collection of poetry, Poems, was not published until 1882. Blake's first book was inspired by nature, but her biggest inspiration towards her poems was her family. Blake created several poems on the death of children that portray the times about childhood mortality. Her poems contemplate an attitude towards women's roles: Simple Story and What the Wife’s Heart Said desire women to be pleased while serving their husbands and families. Her poem The Ballad of Elizabeth Zane and Isabella of Castille (1890) conveys appreciation for spirited, independent women.

She later published the collections Verses along the Way (1890) and In the Harbour of Hope (1907) and two volumes of children's verse, The Merry Months All (1885) and Youth in Twelve Centuries (1886). She published three volumes of travel writing: On the Wing (1883), about her trip to the western United States, serialized in the Boston Journal; Mexico: Picturesque, Political, Progressive (1888), a collaboration with Margaret F. Sullivan; and A Summer Holiday in Europe (1890), three of her five trips to Europe were with her children.

Blake actively participated in the American Peace Society that influenced her work life and her poems. Her criticism of militarism, The Coming Reform: A Woman's Word (1887), was popular during the Spanish–American War.
