= Sibylla Bailey Crane =

American educator, musical composer and author

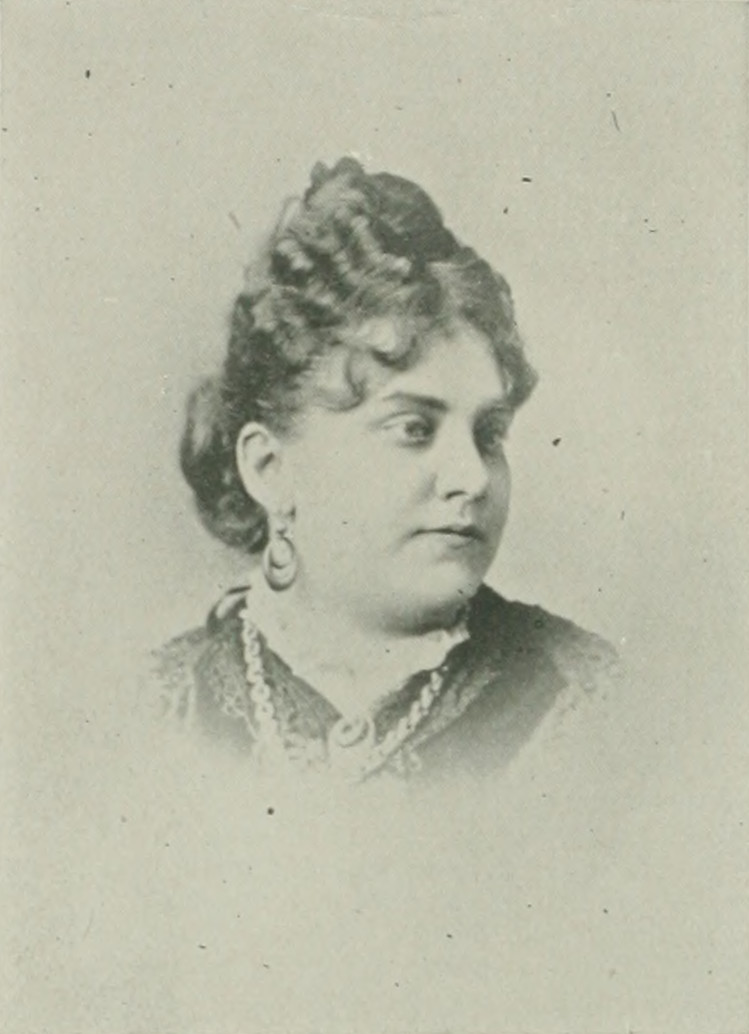
- "A Woman of the Century"
- Born: Sibylla Adelaide Bailey; July 30, 1851; East Boston, Massachusetts, U.S.
- Died: January 31, 1902 (aged 50); Boston
- Occupations: educator; composer; author
- Spouse: Oliver Crane (m. 1891; died 1896)
- Relatives: Joseph Bellamy
- Writing career
- Subject: music
- Notable work: Glimpses of the Old World

Sibylla Bailey Crane (née, Bailey; July 30, 1851 – January 31, 1902) was an American educator, musical composer, and author. Her benevolent work included that of the church, the educational institutions of Massachusetts, the general theological library, and the prisons and reformatory schools of the state. She was prominent in musical and social circles and in various patriotic and other organizations, and contributed liberally for the advancement of many worthy objects. Crane was the author of a volume entitled, Glimpses of the Old World.

== Early life and education ==
Sibylla Adelaide Bailey was born in East Boston, Massachusetts, July 30, 1851. She was the only child of Henry and Elizabeth (Bellamy) Bailey. Her father was a contractor and builder. His ancestors were residents of Scituate, Massachusetts. Her mother, a native of Kittery, Maine, was the daughter of John H. and Fanny (Keen) Bellamy and grand-daughter of John Bellamy, Jr., of Kittery, who married November 21, 1791, Tamsen, daughter of Samuel King and Mary (Orne) Haley. On the maternal side, she was a descendant of Rev. Dr. Joseph Bellamy, the theologian, and on the paternal side, from one of the Mayflower Pilgrims.

Crane was educated in the public schools of Boston. She acquired a thorough education and cultivated her talents in music, the languages and literature, to an unusual degree under the best instructors in the city.

== Career ==
For a number of years, she followed the profession of teacher in Boston. She also became an accomplished performer on the piano and a pleasing vocalist. Meanwhile, she continued her studies in music and languages, and in 1878, began to compose music for the poems of Henry Wadsworth Longfellow and John Greenleaf Whittier, attracting wide attention.

Crane was deeply interested in the work of the philanthropists of Boston. She was elected a director of the Women's Educational and Industrial Union, and an officer of the Beneficent Society whose members aided talented and needy students to pass the course of study in the New England Conservatory of Music. She was a worker in the church and was a member of the committee of the General Theological Library. Crane was a co-founder of the Castilian Club.

Her musical compositions were sung by her in the prisons and hospitals which she visited in her philanthropic work. Crane refused publicity for her voice except in the direction of duty to society or charity.

In 1879, she traveled in Europe, and on her return, published a book, entitled, Glimpses of the Old World (1881), which was favorably received because of its style and wealth of information on art and history. As an essayist, she evinced especial adaptation, having been called to read her articles throughout Massachusetts. Notably amongst the elaborate essays that Crane read before literary associations may be mentioned, "Cordova under the Moors in the Tenth Century" and "The History of Music from the early Egyptian down to the present time", which she illustrated with her voice, giving interpretations of native songs as heard by her in her extensive travels in Europe and the Orient.

== Affiliations ==
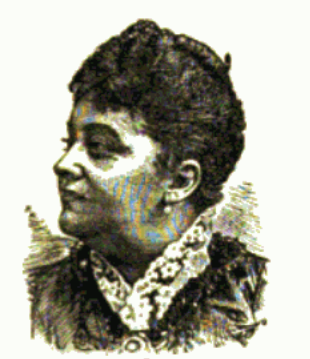
1897

She had superior executive ability, which made her a good presiding officer.

Crane was president of the Daughters of Massachusetts, vice-president of the Wednesday Morning Club, vice-president of the Cora Stuart Wheeler, and vice-regent of the Boston Tea Party Chapter, Daughters of the American Revolution. She was an Associate Member of the New England Woman's Press Association.

She was for several years treasurer of the New England Women's Club and a member of the Executive Council of the Boston Woman's Business League, also a director in the Woman's Club House Corporation, a member of the Woman's Charity Club, of the Moral Education Association, of the Women's Educational and Industrial Union, of the beneficent society connected with the New England Conservatory of the Cercle Francais de l'Alliance, and of the Society for the University Education of Women.

Crane was a director and treasurer of the Massachusetts Society for the University Education of Women. She was also a member of the Bostonian Society, the American Oriental Society, and the Boston Browning Society.

== Personal life and legacy ==
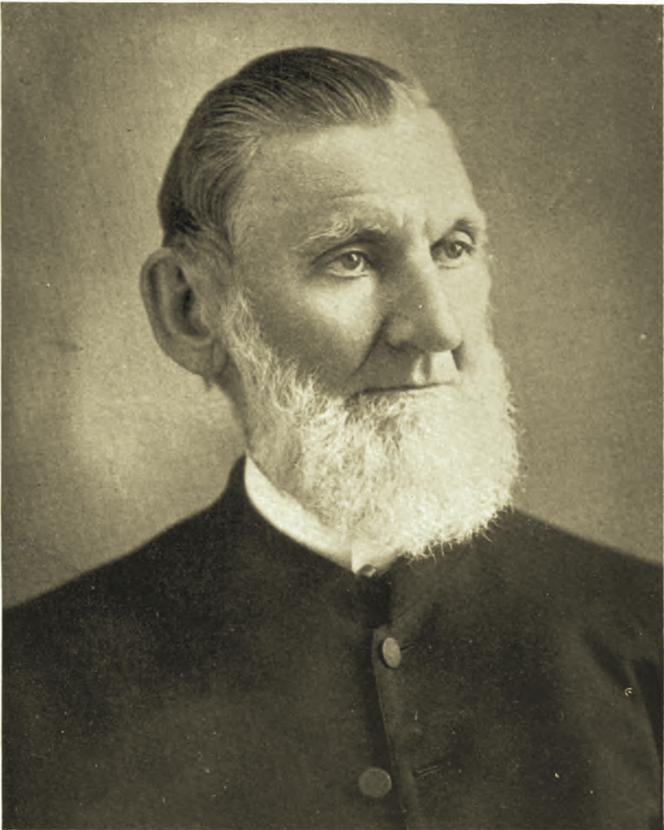
Oliver Crane

On September 1, 1891, she married in Boston, the Rev. Dr. Oliver Crane, a native of Montclair, New Jersey, and a graduate of Yale College, class of 1845. Dr. Crane had been a missionary in Turkey for some years in his early manhood, and later, pastor of various Presbyterian churches. Before marriage, Mrs. Crane had made a brief trip to Europe. After that event, she accompanied her husband in an extended foreign tour, travelling in the British Isles, on the Continent, and in the East, spending a winter in Cairo and visiting Syria, the scene of Dr. Crane's missionary labors many years before. A large number of photographs and other souvenirs attested the assiduity with which their labors as collectors were pursued, from the pyramids of Egypt to the Alhambra. On their return from abroad, they took up their residence in Boston. Here Dr. Crane died on November 29, 1896.

Sibylla Bailey Crane died in Boston, January 31, 1902. (Note: According to Herringshaw (1909), Crane died in 1900. According to Howe (1904), Crane died in February 1902.)

General Henry B. Carrington, of Hyde Park, Massachusetts, who was intimately acquainted with Mrs. Crane as the wife and afterward the widow of his classmate, the Rev. Crane, paid the following tribute to her memory:—

"I did not know her personally until shortly before their marriage, in the consummation of which my wife and myself greatly rejoiced. His literary and poetical tastes found in her congenial attributes the complement to his most ardent wishes. Living so near my home, they were like brother and sister to me. In his last illness the intimacy became more constant, until, as his last request, I promised to give to her the affection and care of a true brother as long as she should survive his departure. And then, in the examination of the literary and class material left by him, I shared with her the care and disposition of the same.

The Bailey Crane Fund at Boston University was established in 1906 from the estate of Elizabeth Bellamy Bailey under the clause which left US$5,000 to the university. At a meeting of the Board of Trustees, June 4, 1902, it was “Voted, that the bequest of Mrs. Elizabeth B. Bailey shall be known as the Bailey-Crane Scholarship Fund in memory of Mrs. Elizabeth B. Bailey and Mrs. Sibylla Bailey Crane. Voted, that until further action by the Trustees of Boston University, the income of the Bailey-Crane Fund shall be applied for the aid of worthy and needy young women in the School of Medicine selected by the Faculty of the same."

== Selected works ==
=== Books ===
- Glimpses of the Old World (1881)

=== Essays ===
- "Cordova under the Moors in the Tenth Century"
- "The History of Music from the early Egyptian down to the present time"
