= Woolson =

Woolson is a surname. Notable people with the surname include:

- Abba Goold Woolson (1838–1921), American writer
- Albert Woolson (1850–1956), the last surviving member of the Union Army, which fought in the American Civil War
- Constance Fenimore Woolson (1840–1894), American novelist and short story writer
- John Simson Woolson (1840–1899), United States federal judge
- Woolson Morse (1858–1897), American composer of musical theatre
