= Julia Knowlton Dyer =

American philanthropist (1829–1907)

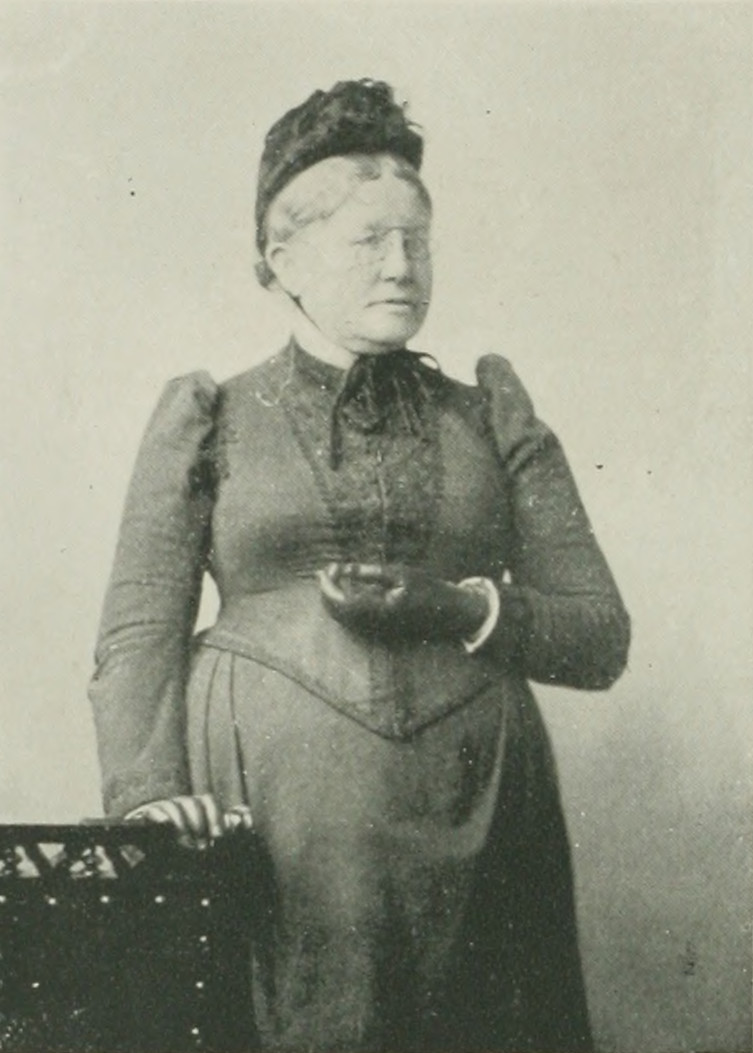
- "A Woman of the Century"
- Born: Julia Ann Knowlton; August 25, 1829; Deerfield, New Hampshire, U.S.
- Died: June 27, 1907 (aged 77); Dorchester, Boston, Massachusetts, U.S.
- Other names: Mrs. Micah Dyer, Jr.
- Occupation: philanthropist

Signature
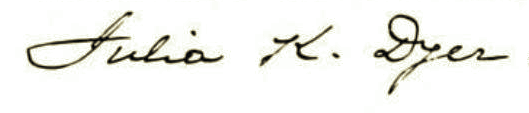

Julia Knowlton Dyer (née , Knowlton; better known as, Mrs. Micah Dyer, Jr.; August 25, 1829 – June 27, 1907) was an American philanthropist of the long nineteenth century. She was associated for over 40 years with nearly every large philanthropic work started in Boston. Her rare executive ability combined with an even temperament made her a natural leader of large bodies. Dyer was prominently connected with 24 associations, only one of which, the Castilian Club, was purely literary. She was president of the Soldiers' Home in Chelsea, Massachusetts, president and founder of the Woman's Charity Club, a member of the executive boards of the Home for Intemperate Women, the Helping Hand Association, and president of the local branch of the Woman's Christian Temperance Union (W.C.T.U.). For 26 years, she was a manager for the Home for Female Prisoners in Dedham, Massachusetts, and was a life member of The Bostonian Society. The Woman's Charity Club Hospital was started by Dyer, president of the Woman's Charity Club; originally located at 28 Chester Park, a few years later, a more commodious hospital was built on Boston's Parker Hill.

== Early life and education ==
Julia Ann Knowlton was born in Deerfield, New Hampshire, August 25, 1829. Her father was Joseph Knowlton, and her mother Susan Dearborn. Upon Bunker Hill Monument are inscribed the names of her mother's grandfather, Nathaniel Dearborn, and of her own grandfather, Thomas Knowlton. Julia Knowlton was one of six children. Her father served in the War of 1812, and his namesake, her brother, Joseph H. Knowlton, was a member of the secret expedition against Fort Beaufort, in the Civil War. The immigrant progenitor of the Knowlton family of New England was Captain William Knowlton, who died on the voyage from London to Nova Scotia, and whose sons a few years later settled at Ipswich, Massachusetts, the earliest to arrive there, it is said, being John in 1639. Julia had six siblings.

During her infancy, her parents removed to Concord, New Hampshire, and in 1839, they took up their residence in Manchester, New Hampshire, where for 20 years, her father was connected with the Land and Water Company, besides filling important positions of trust.

Up to the age of 14, her education was gained in private schools. She then went to the boarding-school of Miss Ela in Concord, New Hampshire, where she remained one year, after which she entered the New Hamilton Institute, known at that time as one of the best schools for girls in the country. At eighteen Miss Knowlton was graduated with the highest honors.

== Career ==
After graduation, Miss Knowlton taught a year in the high school in Manchester, New Hampshire, then under the principalship of Amos Hadley. She was a successful instructor in French, Latin, English literature, and higher mathematics. She prepared a large class of young men for college, in geometry.

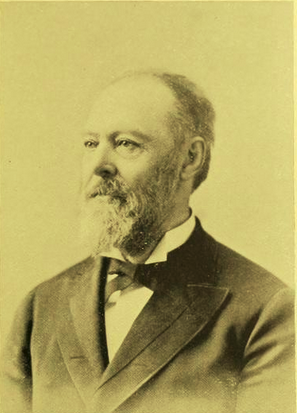
Micah Dyer, Jr.

While a teacher, Miss Knowlton met Micah Dyer, Jr., then a rising young lawyer of Boston. After a short engagement, they were married, May 1, 1851, and took up their residence in Boston. Family duties occupied all of Mrs. Dyer's time during the first ten years of her married life, but as their three children (two sons and a daughter) grew up, she found time for charitable work.

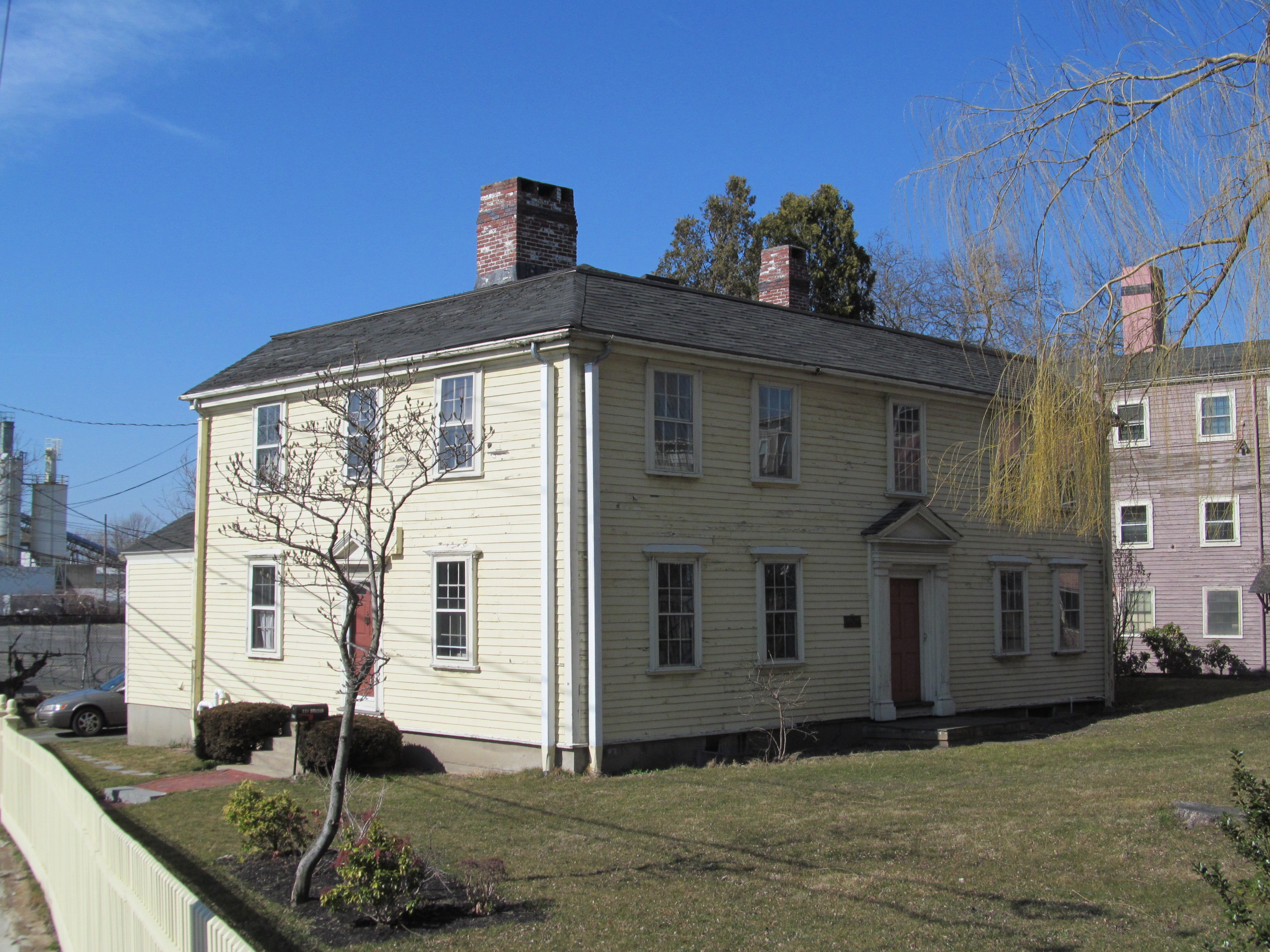
The Dyer's home in Dochester was previously the Clapp family home

In 1861, the couple purchased the old estate at Uphams Corner, in Boston's Dorchester neighborhood, which belonged to the Clapp family for a generation. The Captain Lemuel Clap House was situated on an elevation, and was surrounded by carefully kept lawns, with shade trees, many of which were more than 100 years old. The first tulip bulbs brought to the U.S. were planted in this garden.

During the Civil War (1861–65) she did what she could to alleviate the sufferings of the soldiers. She was known to have fired a shot in the war which didn't injure anyone but saved a man's life.

=== Public works ===
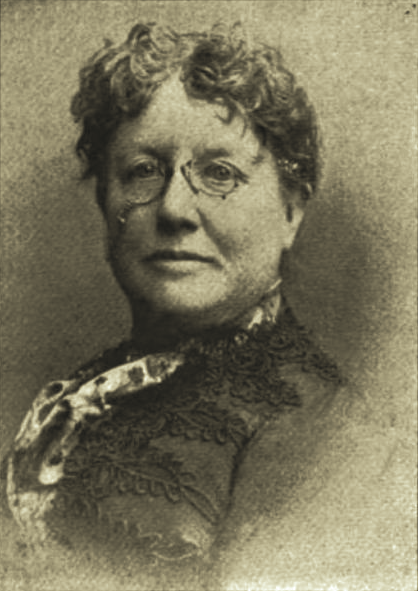
Dyer (The Granite Monthly, 1892)

The first public work of Dyer was on the Board of Management of the Dedham Home for Discharged Female Prisoners, to which she was appointed in 1864. For 28 years, she never failed, except during serious illness, to pay her monthly visit.

When the Ladies' Aid Society was formed to aid the Soldiers' Home in Chelsea, Massachusetts, Dyer was made its secretary, and the next year, 1882, its president, a position that she held for 10 years. Dyer's military ancestry fitted her well for this office. Under her guidance, the numbers rapidly increased, and thousands of dollars were raised to give comforts to the home. The society furnished rooms, provided a library as well as many smaller luxuries. A pastel portrait of the "right bower of the Soldiers' Home" (as the trustees called Mrs. Dyer), executed by Mrs. Sarah P. Billings of the Ladies Aid, hung in the chapel of the home, and one of the rooms was set apart and named for her.

During her presidency of the Ladies' Aid, she conducted several fairs, which netted a considerable amount of money. The Ladies' Aid table at the Soldiers' Carnival under her direction cleared nearly US$6,000. Later, a kettledrum for the same benefit netted US$4,000, and another fair for the Soldiers' Home netted US$10,000.

The Boston Educational and Industrial Union in 1885 asked Dyer to take charge of an entertainment for its benefit, and she arranged a Dickens Carnival, which brought in US$7,000. In 1888, Dyer was at the head of the Board of Managers of the fair held in the Boston Music Hall by which the sum of US$13,000 was raised in a single week for the benefit of The Home for Intemperate Women.

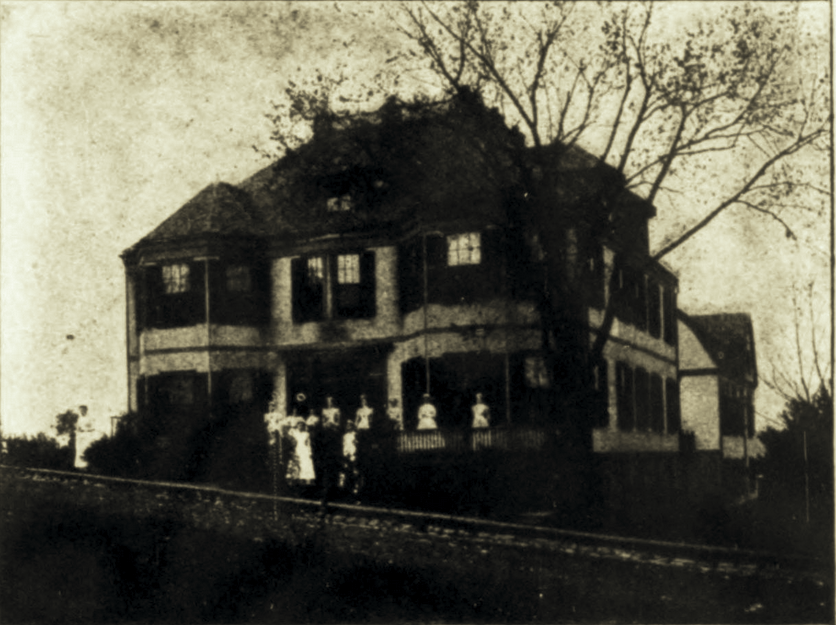
Woman's Charity Club Hospital (1899)

The Woman's Charity Club of Boston was the outgrowth of this fair. The committee of fifty women who had worked together under Dyer's guidance banded themselves together to raise money for any good object. Dyer conceived the idea of starting a free hospital for women without means in need of important surgical operations. A house at 38 Chester Park was bought, and the Woman's Charity Club Hospital started when the Woman's Charity Club had no money in its treasury. In 1892, the hospital was removed and englared at Parker Hill. The Legislature subsequently granted US$15,000, which cleared off its indebtedness. In 1904, the Woman's Charity Club numbered nearly 7,000 members, and the Woman's Charity Club Hospital was a monument of their good work. Dyer was the president from the first; the badge of the Woman's Charity Club was a circular pin surmounted with the head of the president in bronze. In the hall of the Woman's Charity Club Hospital was another lifelike portrait of Dyer, painted by the resident physician, Ida R. Brigham.

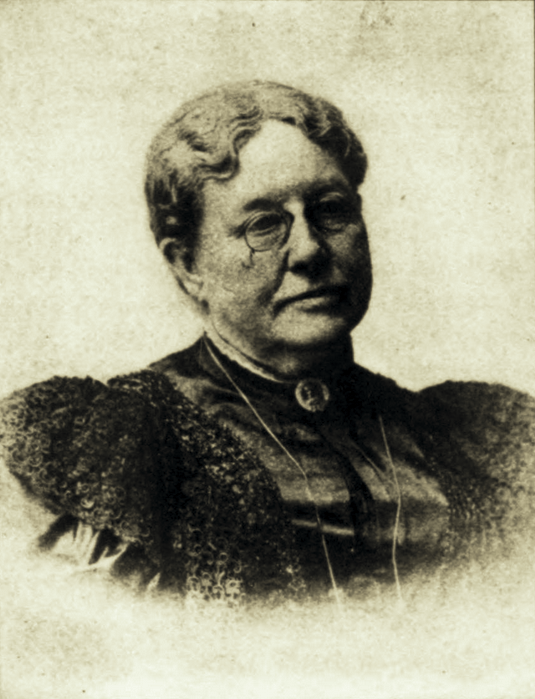
Dyer (Good Housekeeping, 1899)

Dyer was the organizer and president of the Wintergreen Club, to which only women aged 50 and older were eligible. Among its members were Julia Ward Howe, Mary Livermore, Maria Herrick Bray, Kate Tannatt Woods, and Mary Dana Hicks.

Another society which Dyer initiated was the "Take Heed", from the text, "Take heed that ye speak not evil of one another." She was also president of the W.C.T.U. of Uphams Corner, an office she filled for seven years, being its second president, resigning at one time, and accepting the office again in 1899. She was a member and one of the board of directors of the Castilian Club, and a life member of the Bostonian Society. Among other societies and clubs with which she was actively connected included the Moral Education Society, the National Prison Association, the Benefit Society for the University Education of Women, the Helping Hand Society, the Dorchester Woman's Club, and the Book Review Club of Dorchester, the last-named two being strictly literary clubs. It was estimated that approximately US$250,000 was raised for charities through her leadership. She was also vice-president of the Federation of Woman's Clubs (covering 172 clubs). Early inclined to literary work, for which the duties that came to her left little time, Dyer wrote mainly for her clubs many essays and poems.

== Personal life ==
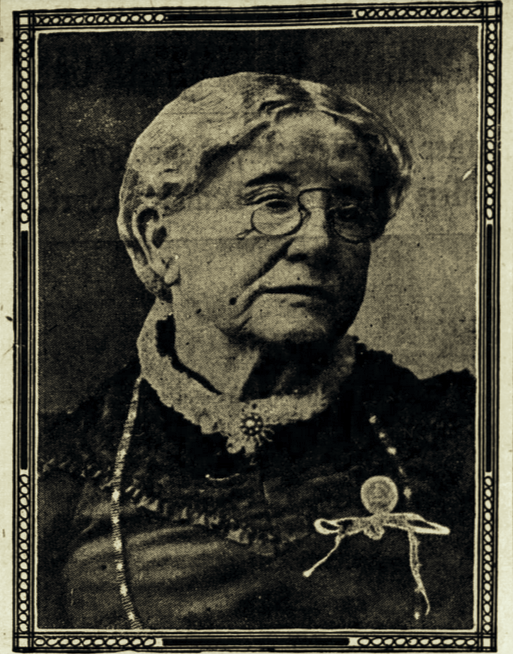
Dyer (The Boston Globe, 1907)

The couple had three children: a daughter who died young and two sons, Dr. Willard Knowlton Dyer, a physician, and Walter Richardson Dyer, who was associated with his father in the legal profession.

She was a member of the Methodist Church, but she attended regularly the services of her husband's choice, in the Church of the Unity, Boston, without comment, but without affecting her own faith.

For 18 years, Dyer passed her summers at the Isles of Shoals.

After her husband's death in 1898, she made her home with her son and his wife in Dorchester, having her own suite of rooms, where she continued to provide hospitality to others.

Julia Knowlton Dyer died of heart disease at her home in Dorchester, Boston, June 27, 1907. Burial was at Mount Auburn Cemetery.
