= Martha Perry Lowe =

American poet

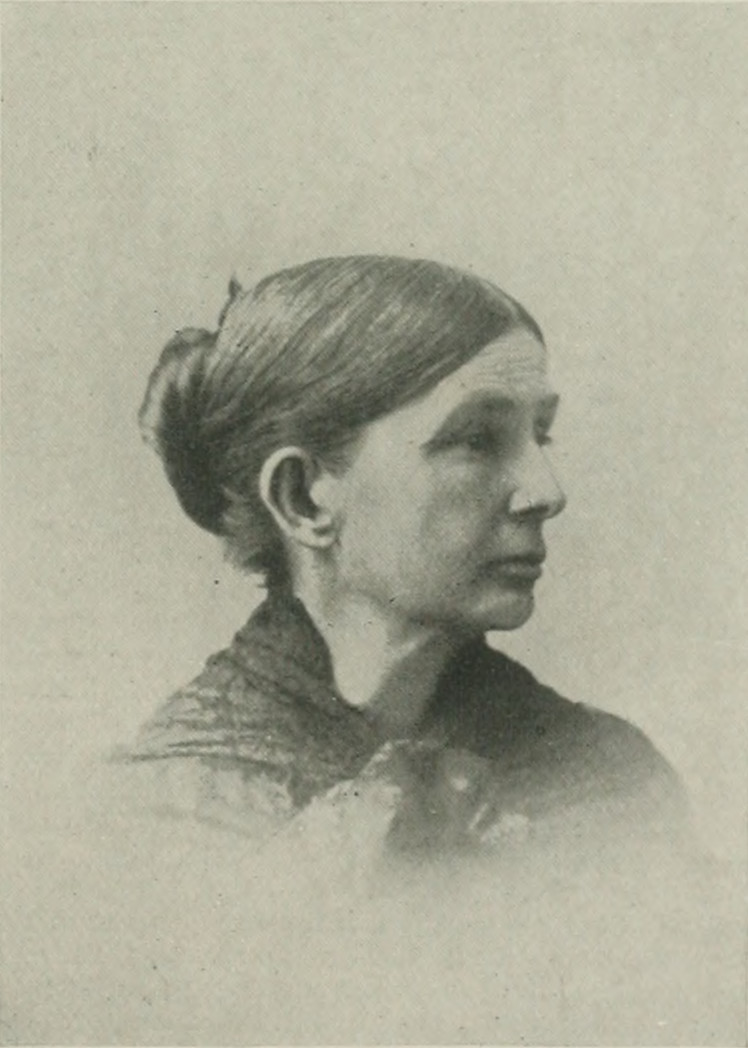
- Photo in A Woman of the Century
- Born: Martha Ann Perry; November 21, 1829; Keene, New Hampshire, U.S.
- Died: May 6, 1902 (aged 72); Somerville, Massachusetts, U.S.
- Education: Elizabeth Sedgwick's School for Young Ladies
- Occupations: writer, social activist, organizer
- Spouse: Charles Lowe (m. 1857)
- Writing career
- Genres: poetry, prose
- Notable works: The Olive and the Pine; Love in Spain; Memoir of Charles Lowe

Martha Perry Lowe (née, Perry; November 21, 1829 - May 6, 1902) was an American writer of poetry and prose, as well as a social activist and organizer. She supported women's rights, temperance, education, and Unitarian organizations. In 1871, from Europe, Lowe corresponded regularly for the Liberal Christian. In Somerville, she was connected with the Unitarian Review. She was the author of several books of prose and poetry; the most noted ones include The Olive and the Pine, Love in Spain, and a Memoir of Charles Lowe. She was interested in many public and private philanthropies, but her chief interests were in the public schools. She was among the first to advocate the teaching of cooking and sewing, and at her suggestion a sum of money was raised for that purpose. She was one of the founders of the Educational Union in Somerville, one of whose duties was a regular visitation of the schools by its members. She was a member of the Society of American Authors of New York, the Authors' Club of Boston, the Woman's Education Association, and the Unitarian Church Temperance Society, as well as an honorary member of the Castilian Club, of the Heptorean Club, of the Teachers' Annuity Guild, honorary president of the Woman Suffrage League, a director of the Massachusetts Suffrage Association, president of the Woman's Alliance of the First Unitarian Church, and a member of the Cambridge Branch of the Indian Association.

== Early life and education ==
Martha Ann Perry was born in Keene, New Hampshire, November 21, 1829. Her parents were Gen. Justus Perry and Hannah Wood. She was a descendant of William Wood, the supposed author of New England's Prospects, who left England and settled in Concord in 1638.

As a child, Lowe was rather heedless, enjoying more her life out of doors than plays or studies in the house. She loved her garden, the animals about the farm, and all out-of-door games and amusements.

Between the ages of 12 and 14, she lost her father and mother, an older sister, and a younger brother who had been her constant companion. Thereafter, Lowe, her sister Ellen, and her brother Horatio continued to live in the family with an aunt and cousin.

Perry attended the district school and the Keene Academy. At the age of 12, she and Martha were old enough to have a more advanced education, and they were sent to Elizabeth Sedgwick's 'School for Young Ladies' in Lenox, Massachusetts. The influence of this school was to them both a lasting benefit. On the return of the two sisters from Lenox, their pastor Rev. Abiel Abbott Livermore and his wife were invited to make the Perry family mansion their home. Lowe occupied her leisure with riding, driving, and singing. After a year at home, she went to Boston, to take piano lessons. Her first winter was spent with the family of Mrs. George Bond, one of the ladies of Boston society. Her second winter in Boston was devoted to lessons in singing, and she stayed in the home of Dr. and Mrs. Henry I. Bowditch.

In the meantime, the elder brother, Horatio, after graduating from Harvard College, had enlisted in the Mexican–American War, and served as aide-de-camp on the staff of General Shields. On his return from the war, he went with his sisters and the Livermores to the West Indies, where they spent a winter. When the party returned, Horatio received through President Zachary Taylor an appointment as Secretary of Legation to Spain. He accepted the position, and not long after married Carolina Coronado, poet-laureate of Spain. Horatio Perry continued to live abroad, and became distinguished in Spain. Lowe and her sister visited them, and while there, studied French, learned to speak Spanish, and attended many court balls and receptions, under the reign of Queen Isabella II. During that winter in Madrid, they also met many persons of distinction. They afterward traveled on the Continent and in England, returning finally to their old home in Keene.

== Career ==
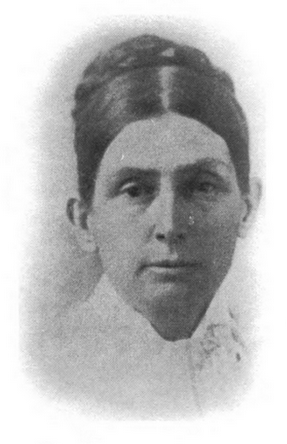
(undated)

=== Marriage and early writing ===
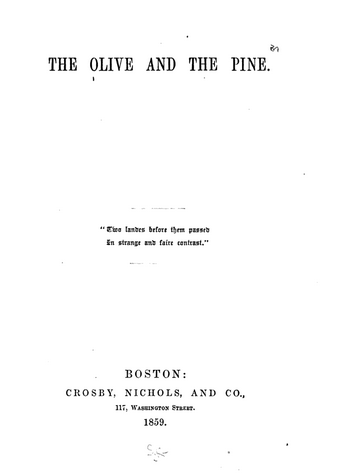
The Olive and the Pine

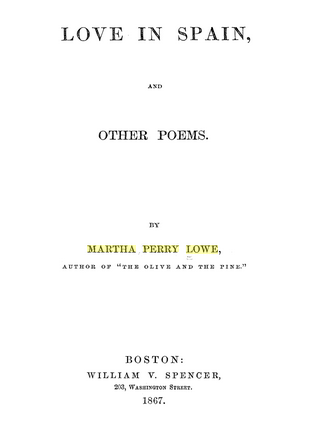
Love in Spain, and Other Poems

After her graduation, she spent a winter in the West Indies, and the following year was passed in Madrid with her brother, who was a member of the Spanish legation. After her time abroad, Lowe resolved to put into form a poetic souvenir of her travels. During this time, her sister Ellen married Dr. Edward B. Peirson of Salem, Massachusetts. While Lowe was visiting in this new home, she met the Rev. Charles Lowe, pastor of the North Church of that city. They were married in the autumn of 1857. After a trip in the Berkshires, they settled on the Pickman farm, which belonged to Dr. and Mrs. George B. Loring, and was situated about 1.5 miles (2.4 km) from Salem. Mr. Lowe at this time was obliged, on account of ill health, to resign his pastorate at the North Church. Their stay on the farm was of short duration, but they were able to secure a nearby cottage close to the water, which they called "Mill-side", where Mrs. Lowe completed her first book, The Olive and the Pine, or Spain and New England. The first part is devoted to Spain, and the latter to New England.

Mr. Lowe soon regained health and strength, after a year of rest and change, and accepted a call to the parish of the First Congregational Society in Somerville. In this city, the Lowes established their first home, building a pleasant house on one of the hills commanding a view of Cambridge and Boston; and here their two daughters, Mary Foote and Jeanie Wood, were born. Mrs. Lowe entered into church work; and she also, at the time of the American Civil War, published a second book, called Love in Spain, a dramatic poem. The book also contained poems on the Civil War and on miscellaneous subjects.

Mr. Lowe twice went South during the war as chaplain. He was chairman of the army committee of the Association, and gave his time and strength to the Freedmen's Aid Society and to the Sanitary Commission. On his return, failing health once more forced him to relinquish his charge at Somerville. He then became secretary of the American Unitarian Association, where his services were valuable during one of the critical periods in the history of the denomination. His ill health compelled him to retire from the secretaryship in 1871. Now that this work was finished, the Lowes, with their daughters, went abroad for nearly two years; spending their winters, on account of Mr. Lowe's health, in southern France, Italy, and Spain; returning to Switzerland and England during the summer months. On their return to Boston, Mr. Lowe started a religious magazine, The Unitarian Review, in the interest of his denomination, in which work Mrs. Lowe assisted him. Mr. Lowe's health declined rapidly during the winter and spring, and it seemed advisable to try the benefit of sea air for the invalid. In the month of June, he went with his family to Swampscott, Massachusetts, where, after an illness of two weeks, he died on June 20, 1874.

=== Widowhood and later works ===
After the death of her husband, Lowe prepared the Memoir of Charles Lowe, which was published in 1884, a book not only full of interesting incidents of her husband's life, but containing a vivid history of the liberal church of that period. She continued to live in the home in Somerville, devoting herself to the care and education of her daughters. As the years went by, she took a more active part in the work of her church, and in the different organizations to which she belonged in Somerville and Boston. She also continued to werite, contributing notes on "Things at Home and Abroad" in The Unitarian Review, "Gleanings of Foreign Thought" for the Transcript, writing summer sketches for the Woman's Journal, also many poems for different occasions, and memorial verses for the dead.

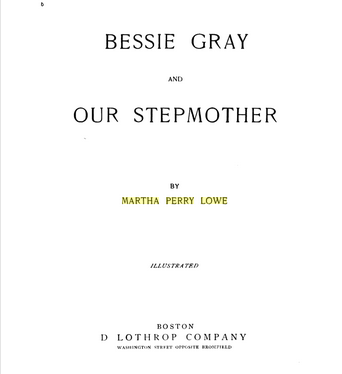
Bessie Gray; And, Our Stepmother

The Story of Chief Joseph was published in 1881, a metrical version of the eloquent speech of Chief Joseph, in order to awaken sympathy for the Native American cause. Bessie Grey was a small illustrated gift-book.(Lowe 1891, p. 1) Her last work was a volume of poems, many of which had been printed before, but rearranged and published in 1900, an Easter memorial tribute called The Immortals. She contributed often to the journals in her own town, and constantly contributed to newspapers and periodicals. Lowe was frequently invited to read poems on public occasions.

== Activism ==
=== Schools, clubs, and church ===
Lowe was one of the earliest members of the New England Women's Club, which she attended regularly for many years, often joining in the discussion at its meetings, or reading a poem at the club teas. She was a member of the Society of American Authors of New York, an honorary member of the Castilian Club of Boston, a member of the Women's Education Association of Boston, of the Authors' Club, the Educational and Industrial Union, and the Unitarian Church Temperance Society. She was a life member of the American Unitarian Association, and at one time the only woman on its board of directors. She was also a member of the Cambridge Branch of the Massachusetts Indian Association, and a director of the Massachusetts Suffrage Association.

In Somerville, she was a member of the Associated Charities, the Historical Society, honorary member of the Heptorean Club, honorary member of the Teachers' Annuity Guild, honorary president of the Suffrage League, and president of the Women's Alliance. She was interested in many private and public philanthropies, advocating the cause of Native Americans and Afro-Americans, and giving her sympathies to all in need, from blind children in South Boston to the famine sufferers in the East.

Lowe, with the aid of Mrs. Maria Theresa Hollander, formed the Woman's Educational Union in Somerville, in about 1878. This was one of the first organizations of women in the city. Its meetings were held once a month, for a number of years, and speakers from Boston and its vicinity were brought before these parlor audiences. Lowe continued to be the president of this society as long as it existed.

During a period of distress in the city of Somerville, Lowe established a bureau to give work to poor women. In this undertaking, ladies met every week during the winter months for a number of years, and the society existed until the need of it was greatly lessened by the formation of the Somerville Associated Charities.

Lowe enjoyed the work of her church, having among other duties taught a class of young women in the Sunday School for many years. At the time of the forming of the Women's National Alliance, the union that Lowe started became a branch, and with the assistance of many women in the parish, it grew to be a large and important organization. Lowe was president of this Alliance during its whole history.

=== Suffrage and temperance ===
Lowe always had an interest and active part in the cause of women's suffrage and the temperance movement. The Suffrage League grew out of the Educational Union, and Lowe was for some time its president, later becoming an honorary president. In 1881, as an ardent suffragist, at the time when Massachusetts first gave women the opportunity to vote on school affairs, she and others worked unceasingly to help the women of the city to avail themselves of this privilege; and it is largely through her labors that women were at last placed upon the School Board of Somerville.

She was most earnest also in promoting the cause of temperance, speaking often in its behalf before the Alliance in her own church. She felt deeply the general lack of interest which was shown in her denomination. Lowe was not a total abstainer, believing the use of alcohol in sickness often a necessity, but she admonished its use in daily life. She had great respect for the work of the Woman's Christian Temperance Union.

== Personal life ==
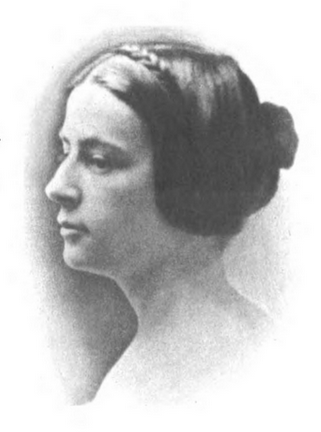
Photo in In Memoriam Martha Perry Lowe, 1829-1902 (1903)

During the last year of her life, her health, always delicate, became more frail, but she kept up her interest in all the former work of her life, in spite of times of discouragement, for she realized that her strength was gradually becoming less. She presided at several Alliance meetings, although her friends well-knew that she was not able to bear the strain; but even in times of great weariness she would have days of enjoyment. Not many months before, on a visit to Concord, Massachusetts, which always brought happiness to her, she took part in the music one evening, and sang to the young people about her. One of the happiest recollections, to those nearest her, was of the last Christmas family gathering, in her own home, when she joined in the simple games and dances with her grandchildren. The two married daughters resided near their mother in Somerville, Massachusetts.

== Death and legacy ==
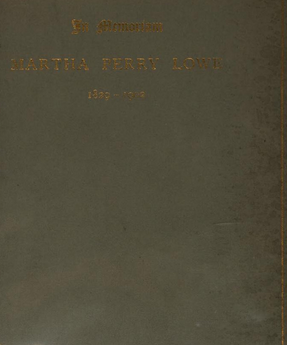
In Memoriam Martha Perry Lowe, 1829-1902

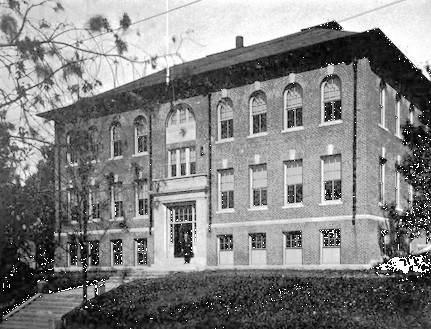
Martha Perry Lowe School in Somerville, Massachusetts

In April 1902, Lowe developed pneumonia, from which, although not of a very serious nature, she did not have the strength to rally. She died on May 6, 1902.

In Memoriam Martha Perry Lowe, 1829-1902 was published in 1903. In the same year, in recognition of her interest and efforts in behalf of the public schools, the School Committee voted to name the new building in West Somerville the Martha Perry Lowe School.

== Selected works ==
=== Books ===
- 1859, The Olive and the Pine
- 1891, Bessie Gray; And, Our Stepmother

=== Hymns ===
- Come, O children, come, and we will sing
- Great Maker, teach us how to hope in man
- Hallowed forever be that twilight hour
- How good it is in love and peace to dwell
- I see it ever there above my head
- Lord, send us forth among thy fields to work
- Sweetly now the day is closing
- Wake, church of freedom, wake
