= Oliver Crane (clergy) =

American Presbyterian clergyman, Oriental scholar and poet

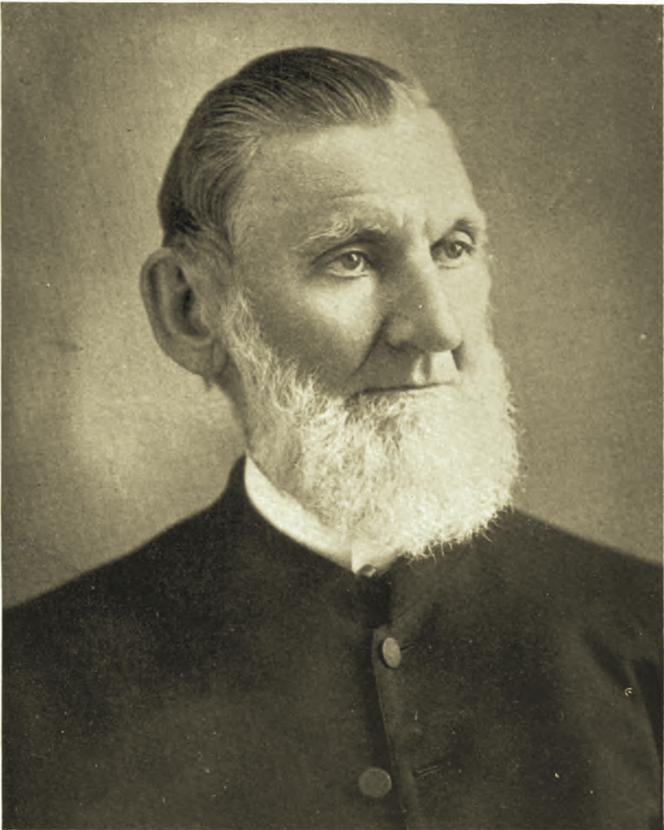
Oliver Crane

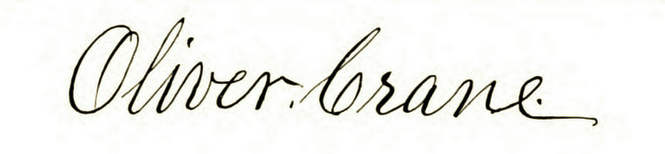

Rev. Oliver Crane, D.D., LL. D. (1822–1896) was a 19th-century American Presbyterian clergyman, Oriental scholar, and poet. His life was an active one, including extensive traveling in Turkey, Europe, Egypt and Palestine, assiduous investigating, and versatile writing. Crane was pastor of several churches in the U.S., but since 1870, he devoted his time largely to literary efforts. He was the author of Minto and Other Poems. translated Virgil's Aeneid literally into English dactylic hexameter.

Crane helped Montclair, New Jersey grow through his efforts in creating Clermont Avenue from Valley Road to Forest Street, and of Forest Street from Clermont Avenue to Walnut Street. He was one of the corporate members of the First Presbyterian Church in the town, and took an active part in all its interests.

== Early life and education ==
Oliver Crane was born in West Bloomfield, now Montclair, New Jersey, July 12, 1822. He was the son of Stephen Fordham and Matilda Howell (Smith) Crane.

His early education began in his native town with Gideon Wheeler as his instructor, in the school-house afterward used by the First Presbyterian Church. After preparing for college, he entered Yale University as a Sophomore, and graduated thence with honors in the class of 1845, and from Union Theological Seminary in 1848.

== Career ==
He was ordained in April 1848, and soon after appointed a missionary of the American Board of Commissioners for Foreign Missions to Turkey. He acquired the Turkish language and did efficient service during the next five years at Broosa, Aleppo, Aintab, and Trebizond. He returned to the U.S. the following year and became pastor of the Presbyterian Church in Huron, New York, and, in 1857, of that in Waverly, New York. Being reappointed missionary in the spring of 1860, he went back to Turkey and was assigned to Adrianople, but, in 1863, circumstances necessitated his return to the U.S.

In 1864, he was elected Professor of Biblical and Oriental Literature in Rutgers Female College, New York City, but declined, to accept a call from the Presbyterian Church of Carbondale, Pennsylvania, where he was installed as pastor.

In 1865–66, he was appointed by his presbytery to prepare a manual for the use of its churches, and in 1869, he had been elected moderator of the large Synod of New York and New Jersey.

In the spring of 1870, he resigned, and the following year, settled in Morristown, New Jersey, where he devoted himself largely to literary work, among other things aiding Gen. Henry B. Carrington, his college classmate, in the preparation of The Battles of the Revolution, which became a standard work.

In 1880, he was chosen Secretary of his college class, in which capacity he prepared an exlaustive biographical record of every member, a book which was a pioneer in this line of publication. In 1883, he issued a small volume of poems under the title of Minto and other Poems. In 1888, he published a hexametrical line-by-line version of Virgil's Æneid, the result of much critical labor, which was favorably received.

In 1886, he was elected a corporate member of the American Oriental Society, of which he became one of the senior members. He was a member of several historical societies, and by appointment of the Governor, a member of the Board of Examiners of the Scientific College of New Jersey. In 1886, he was elected a corporate member of the American Oriental Society, of which he became one of the senior members.

The degree of A.M., was conferred upon Crane by his alma mater; M.D., by the Eclectic Medical College of New York City, in 1866; D.D., by the University of Wooster, Ohio (now College of Wooster), in 1880; and LL.D., by the Westminster College, Fulton, Missouri, in 1888, the last being mainly in recognition of the scholarship evinced in his version of Virgil's Æneid.

== Personal life ==
In later life, he resided in Boston in comparative retirement, while still occupying his time in literary pursuits.

Crane married, September 5, 1848, Marion D. Turnbull, and had by her five children: Louina M., died young; Elizabeth M. (wife of Rev. John S. Gardner); Caroline H. (wife of Edward C. Lyon, Esq.); Oliver T. (married Gertrude N. Boyd); and Louina Mary (wife of Harry C. Crane). Marion Crane died July 23, 1890.

On September 1, 1891, he married Sibylla A. Bailey, of Boston. She was an educator, composer, and writer.

Crane died in 1896.
