= Harriet Winslow Sewall =

American poet

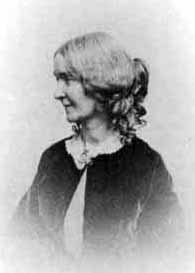
- Born: Harriet Winslow; June 20, 1819; Portland, Maine
- Died: April 19, 1889 (aged 69)
- Occupations: Poet, Editor
- Spouses: Charles List (m. 1848; died 1856) Samuel Edmund Sewall (m. 1857; died 1888)

Harriet Winslow Sewall (June 20, 1819 in Portland, Maine – April 19, 1889) was an American poet, and editor of the collected letters of Lydia Maria Child.

== Biography ==
Winslow was born in Portland, Maine, June 20, 1819 into a Quaker family, where she was educated at a boarding school in Providence, Rhode Island. She was, at least in her early years, interested in transcendentalism and animal magnetism; and arguably more practically engaged with contemporary anti-slave and women's rights movements.

She wrote poetry from an early age, and for many years; but apparently for her own satisfaction and without a view to publication. A number of her works were published, however, and has been republished in a number of collections of American poetry.

She married in 1848 Charles List, a journalist working on the Commonwealth newspaper. He soon became ill, relinquishing his job and placing the burden of support on Harriet, who was assisted by her relatively wealthy family. Charles died in 1856.

In 1857, she married her late sister's husband the lawyer and abolitionist Samuel Edmund Sewall and in 1861 her father died, providing her with a "moderate fortune" enabling her to pursue philanthropic interests. The couple divided their time between Melrose, Massachusetts and Boston, Massachusetts. They were both early members of the New England Women's Club, a Women's suffrage organisation.

In 1882, she arranged for publication the letters of her friend, the author Lydia Maria Child.

Mr. Sewall died in December 1888 at age 89. She died in the following April, being struck by a train whilst crossing the Boston and Albany Railroad.

A collection of her poems was published in November 1889.
