= Adelaide Avery Claflin =

American suffragist and Unitarian minister (1846–1931)

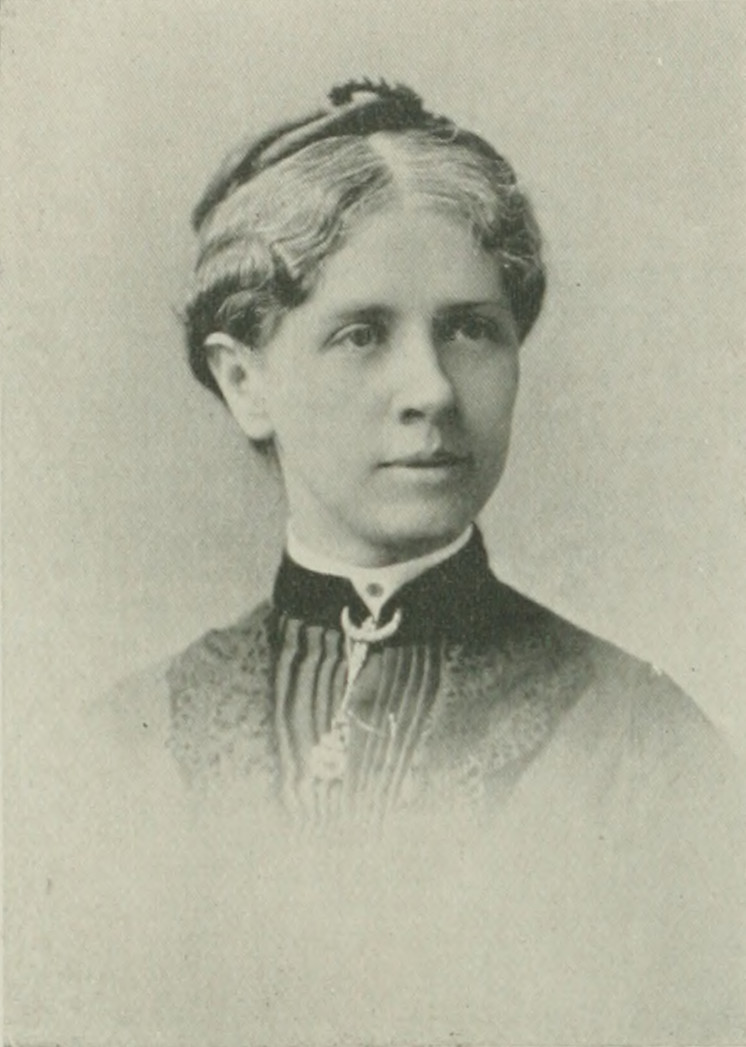
- "A Woman of the Century"
- Born: Narcissa Adelaide Avery; July 28, 1846; Boston, Massachusetts
- Died: May 31, 1931 (aged 84); Cambridge, Massachusetts
- Education: Meadville Theological School
- Occupations: Unitarian minister, Suffragist
- Spouse: Frederick Allan Claflin (m. 1870–1908) his death

Adelaide Avery Claflin (July 28, 1846 – May 31, 1931) was an American woman suffragist and ordained minister.

She became an ordained Unitarian minister at Meadville, Pennsylvania in 1897. She preached in Connecticut, Canada and the West. She was interested in liberal religion, natural science study, literary study and languages. She served on the School Board of Quincy, Massachusetts, 1884-87. She was interested in woman suffrage and education of women. Claflin was a member of the executive board of the Massachusetts Woman Suffrage Association. She was connected with the Boston Equal Suffrage Association. She lectured often on suffrage with Lucy Stone, Mary Livermore, and Julia Ward Howe. She campaigned in Rhode Island, 1886. Claflin was the author of occasional editorials and articles in Boston dailies, and a contributor to Woman's Journal. She was a director of the New England Women's Club, and served as president of Boston's Castilian Club.

== Early years and education ==
Narcissa Adelaide Avery was born in Boston, Massachusetts, July 28, 1846. She was a daughter of Alden Avery and Lucinda Miller (Brown) Avery, both natives of Maine, and both of English ancestry, although there is a little Scotch-Irish blood on the Miller side. Claflin was the second of four children. Her father, although an active business man, had much poetical and religious feeling. He was a prominent member of the Methodist Church, and, on account of his eloquence, was often in earlier life advised to become a minister. Her mother, of a practical, common-sense temperament, had much appreciation of nature and of scientific fact, and a gift for witty and concise expression of thought. So from both parents Claflin derived the ability to speak with clearness and epigrammatic force.

She was a graduate of the Boston Girls' High School, 1862; did private study with Harvard University professors, 1864–65; and graduated from Meadville Theological School, 1896. Although in childhood attending the Methodist Church with their parents, both her sister and Claflin early adopted the Unitarian faith, and joined the church of Rev. James Freeman Clarke.

== Career ==
A year or two later after completing her education, she became a teacher in the Winthrop school.

She married Frederick Allan Claflin (died March 14, 1908), of Boston, November 23, 1870. They resided for many years in Quincy, Massachusetts, and had a son and three daughters. In 1883, Claflin began to speak in public as an advocate of woman suffrage. In 1884, she was elected a member of the Quincy school committee, and served three years in that position, being the first woman who held office in that town. Although she was too busy with family life to take a very active part in public life, she wrote for the Boston papers. She also lectured, and occasionally went on short lecturing tours outside of New England. Best known as a woman suffragist, she wrote and spoke on various other topics.

She died in Cambridge, Massachusetts, May 31, 1931.
