= Rebecca Richardson Joslin =

American writer, lecturer, benefactor and clubwoman

- Born: March 20, 1846; Boston, Massachusetts, U.S.
- Died: August 30, 1934 (aged 88); Boston
- Education: Massachusetts Institute of Technology; New England Conservatory of Music; School of the Museum of Fine Arts, Boston
- Occupations: writer; lecturer; benefactor; clubwoman
- Organizations: Daughters of the American Revolution; Castilian Club
- Notable work: Chasing Eclipses: The Total Solar Eclipses of 1905, 1914, 1925

Rebecca Richardson Joslin (March 20, 1846 – August 30, 1934) was an American writer, lecturer, benefactor, and clubwoman. Joslin's education and affiliations were centered in Boston, Massachusetts. She published one book and many essays, lectured on a wide range of topics, and traveled in the U.S. and abroad. Her will provided for several charitable bequests.

== Early life and education ==
Rebecca Richardson Joslin was born in Boston, March 20, 1846. She was the daughter of Gilman and Mary A. (Cline) Joslin. Rebecca had two siblings, William Burt Joslin (1842–1918) and Gilman Joslin Jr. (1850–1872). Of old Colonial ancestry, she was a descendant of Thomas Joslin (Josselyn) who settled in Hingham, Massachusetts, in 1635; of Thomas Richardson, Charlestown, Massachusetts, in 1635; also of Captain John Joslin Jr., after whom a chapter of the Daughters of the American Revolution (D.A.R.) is named.

She was educated in Boston public grammar and high schools; special student at Massachusetts Institute of Technology (M.I.T.); student at New England Conservatory of Music; and at the School of the Museum of Fine Arts, Boston. Joslin graduated from Posse Gymnasium (both Normal and Medical courses) with diploma, 1894.

== Career ==
Joslin served as secretary (1897–98) and as president (1901–12) of the Castilian Club of Boston, a club devoted to the study of Spain. The Castilian Club Essays, illustrated and bound into volumes, were deposited in the Boston Public Library. She was the author of several essays including: "Essays on Early Years of Charles V. in Spain"; "War of the Comuneros"; "Philip of Anjou and the Archduke Charles", "Rival Claimants to the Spanish Throne"; "Queen Marie of Savoy, and the Princess des Ursins" (the Camarera Mayor); "French Influence in Spain"; "Moratin the Elder"; "The Club of the Fonda de San Sebastian"; "Iriarte and His Fables"; "Italian Literature in the Time of Charles III. of Spain"; "Moratin the Younger and Other Spanish Writers of His Period"; and "Spanish Generals of the Peninsular War". She wrote numerous brochures on subjects pertaining to Spain. She lectured on various topics, some of which included, "The Coronation Durbar at Delhi, 1911"; "Delhi and Its Rulers"; "William Tell and His Home"; "The Coat of Arms of the U.S."; "Beacon Hill, Boston, in Colonial Days"; "The House of Parliament on the Thames"; and "England in Her Hour of Stress". Chasing Eclipses: The Total Solar Eclipses of 1905, 1914, 1925 (Walton Advertising and Printing Company) was published in England in 1929, and reprinted in Boston, 1931.

She was a charter member of the D.A.R. John Hancock Chapter, vice-regent for eight years, and regent 1908–10; member, American Society of Colonial Families, and member, Daughters of Massachusetts.

She served as president of the Posse Alumni Association, and was a member of the M.I.T. Women's Association, and the Massachusetts Society for University Education of Women.

She was also a member of the Copley Society of Boston, American Folklore Society, Free Religlous Association, Author's League, Women's Municipal League, Hahnemann Association, National Geographic Society, Appalachian Mountain Club, Lyceum (London), New England Women's Club, Twentieth Century Club, Parliamentary Law Club, and the Women's City Club.

Joslin traveled very extensively in the U.S. and abroad. She was a guest of the British Government at the Coronation Durbar at Delhi, India, December 1911.

== Personal life ==
Joslin resided at various addresses on Boston's Charles Street.

In religion, she affiliated with the Unitarian church. Her past-time activities included gymnastics, boating, painting, the theatre, the opera, and foreign travel.

== Death and legacy ==
Rebecca Richardson Joslin died at the Phillips House, Massachusetts General Hospital, Boston, August 30, 1934.

Her will contained US$15,000 in public bequests including M.I.T., the Museum of Fine Arts Boston, and the School of Drawing and Painting at the Museum of Fine Arts. The Rebecca Richardson Joslin Fund is credited for the donation of the Tang dynasty era, 680–81 A.D., "Guardian Lion" (唐龍門浮雕石獅子) of Luoyang, Henan Province, China, to the Museum of Fine Arts, Boston. The Rebecca R. Joslin Traveling Scholarship at the Museum of Fine Arts, Boston is named in her honor.

== Selected works ==
=== Books ===
- Chasing Eclipses: The Total Solar Eclipses of 1905, 1914, 1925, 1929

=== Essays ===
- "Essays on Early Years of Charles V. in Spain"
- "War of the Comuneros"
- "Philip of Anjou and the Archduke Charles"
- "Rival Claimants to the Spanish Throne"
- "Queen Marie of Savoy, and the Princess des Ursins"
- "French Influence in Spain"
- "Moratin the Elder"
- "The Club of the Fonda de San Sebastian"
- "Iriarte and His Fables"
- "Italian Literature in the Time of Charles III. of Spain"
- "Moratin the Younger and Other Spanish Writers of His Period"
- "Spanish Generals of the Peninsular War"
