= Castilian Club =

Castilian Club was an American women's study club. It was founded in Boston, Massachusetts, February 8, 1888, by Abba Goold Woolson after a visit to Spain. Sibylla Bailey Crane was a co-founder. According to the Certificates of Corporations Organized Under the General Laws of Massachusetts, the legal date of organization was April 6, 1898 while April 27, 1898 was the date of charter.

== History ==
The club numbered thirteen at the outset and flourished thereafter, being regarded as one of the most desirable clubs of Boston. Its limited membership of 125 was always full. Men were allowed to sit on the Board of Directors, and there were always a few in the membership; still, it was essentially a woman's club and so considered. The object, as stated in the constitution, was "to acquire knowledge concerning Spain -- its geography, history, literature, language, arts, and social conditions." Meetings were held on alternate Wednesdays. In 1888, the subject of study was the reign of Philip III of Spain, with papers to occupy three-quarters of an hour by members only.

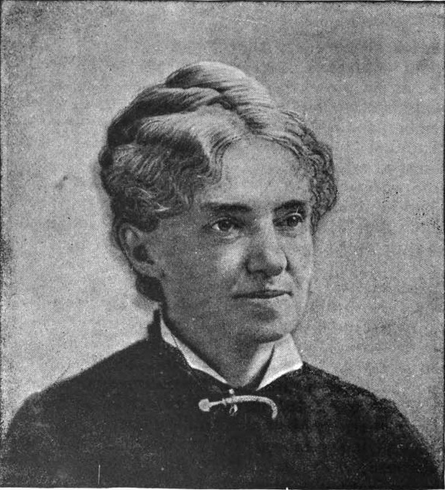
Abba Goold Woolson

The club owed much of its success to its first president, Woolson, who was devoted to its interests. The annual meeting was held the first Wednesday in February. The club celebrated Queen Isabella's birthday, April 22d, by a 'Spanish dinner".

The Castilian Club was not a member of any federation. Other women's study clubs of the era included the Ruskin Art Club of Los Angeles, California, the Mustard Seed of Brunswick, Maine (a Chautauqua course), and Over-the-Teacups of Indianapolis, Indiana (literary and social club).

== Notable people ==
- Adelaide Avery Claflin
- Sibylla Bailey Crane
- Julia Knowlton Dyer
- Rebecca Richardson Joslin
- Martha Perry Lowe
- Cora Stuart Wheeler
- Abba Goold Woolson
