= Sarah Stoddard Eddy =

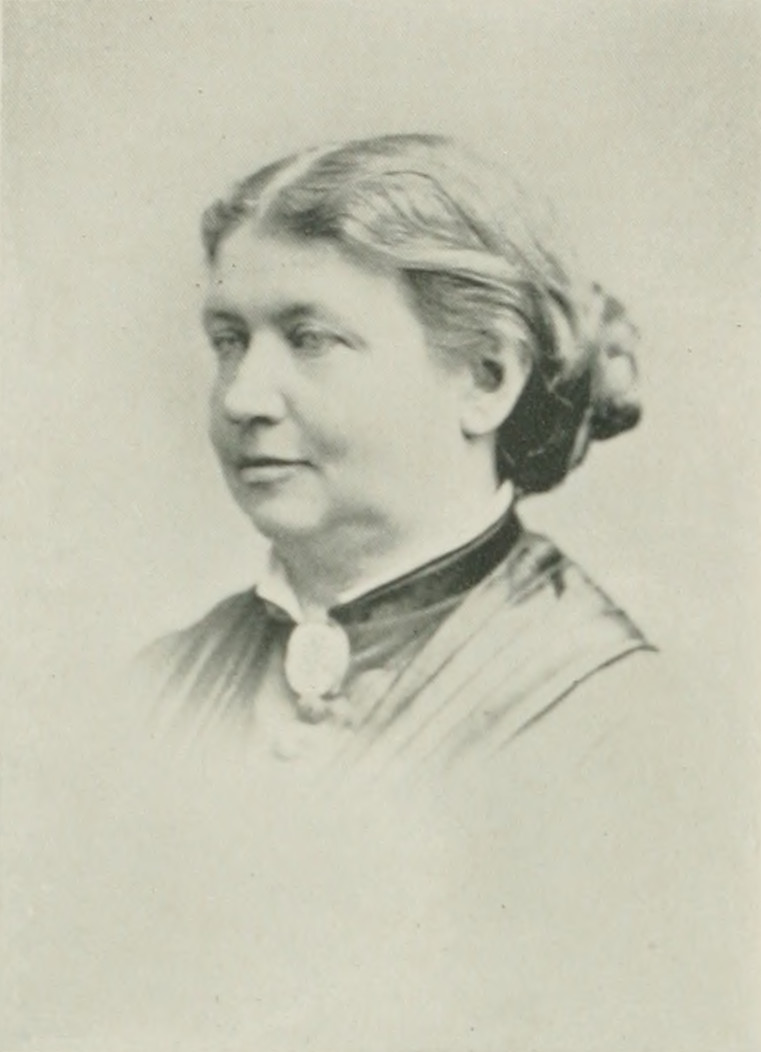
- "A Woman of the Century"
- Born: Sarah Stoddard; February 24, 1831; Hudson, New York, USA
- Died: February 24, 1904; Cambridge, Massachusetts, USA
- Occupations: social reformer; clubwoman
- Spouse: Richard Eddy (m. 1852))
- Children: 5

Sarah Stoddard Eddy (February 24, 1831 – February 24, 1904) was an American social reformer and clubwoman.

== Early life and education ==
Sarah Stoddard was born in Hudson, New York, February 24, 1831. Her grandfather, Ashbel Stoddard, was among the first settlers of Hudson, who went from Nantucket and Providence, Rhode Island, and were mostly of Quaker descent. He came of a severely orthodox family. Congregational ministers were numerous on both his father's and on his mother's side, but he had become more liberal. He established a printing office, bookstore and bindery in the central part of the new city and on April 7, 1785, issued the first number of the Hudson Weekly Gazette. That was the pioneer newspaper of the Hudson valley and the oldest in the State. In 1824, he sold that political newspaper and published the Rural Repository, a literary weekly which had a wide circulation. To the editing of that paper and to the printing establishment the father of Sarah, William Bowles Stoddard, an only son, succeeded. Familiarity bred a reverence for books with a great love for them and a desire for their constant companionship. The mother of Mrs. Eddy was of a Holland Dutch family. She had literary taste and skill. Sarah's siblings included Eliza, Ashbel, Catharine, William, John, Samuel, George, Martha, and Evelyn.

Sarah was educated in private schools in Hudson and in Clinton, New York. Her preference was for literary studies, the languages and composition.

== Career ==
In March, 1852, she married Rev. Richard Eddy (1828-1906), (Note: At some point, the couple must have divorced because in 1898, Rev. Eddy married secondly, Lucy E. Proctor.) a Universalist clergyman of Rome, New York. After living in Rome two years, she removed to Buffalo, New York, then to Philadelphia, Pennsylvania, and then to Canton, New York, where she lived until the beginning of the Civil War. Rev. Eddy was appointed chaplain of the 60th New York State Volunteers and, having gone to the front with his regiment, Mrs. Eddy with her children went to live in Baltimore, Maryland, early in January, 1862, that her husband might more frequently see his family, and that she might find some way to be of service. She assisted in forming the aid associations in Baltimore and spent her days in the camps and the hospitals near the city.

At the close of the war, Rev. Eddy became pastor of the First Universalist Church in Philadelphia, and. after living in that city for five years, she lived in Franklin, Gloucester, College Hill, Brookline and Melrose, Massachusetts. The Eddy's had five children, Frederick William (b. 1853), Martha Maria (b. 1856), Richard Henry (b. 1858), Benjamin Franklin (b. 1860), and Sarah Mabel (b. 1867).

In the early 1890s, she was a resident of Boston. Eddy was a member of the New England Women's Club, of the Women's Educational and Industrial Union, and of the National Woman Suffrage Association of Massachusetts. She represented the latter as a delegate to Washington, D.C. Eddy organized several clubs in towns where she lived, and presided over them for a time. She encouraged women everywhere to band themselves together for study and mutual help. In literary matters, she did only fugitive work, though she was a member of several purely literary clubs.

== Death ==
Sarah Stoddard Eddy died in Cambridge, Massachusetts, February 24, 1904.
