= Amos Hadley =

American politician

Amos Hadley (May 14, 1825 – May 1908) worked in the newspaper business, served as a state representative, was New Hampshire superintendent of public instruction, and founded the historical commission in Concord, New Hampshire, that published an official history of the city. He published a book on Walter Harriman. He served as a state representative from Bow, New Hampshire, in 1850 and 1851. He served as state superintendent of public education.

He graduated from Dartmouth College. He was in a society there.

He published a history of Dunbarton, New Hampshire, with two addresses before the Dunbarton Lyceum. In 1863 he was state printer. In 1865 he published the Quartermaster General's report.

In 1903 he was one of the incorporators of the Historical Commission of Concord.

== Work ==
- Life of Walter Harriman: with selections from his speeches and writings Houghton, Mifflin and Company (1888)
