= Cora Stuart Wheeler =

American journalist

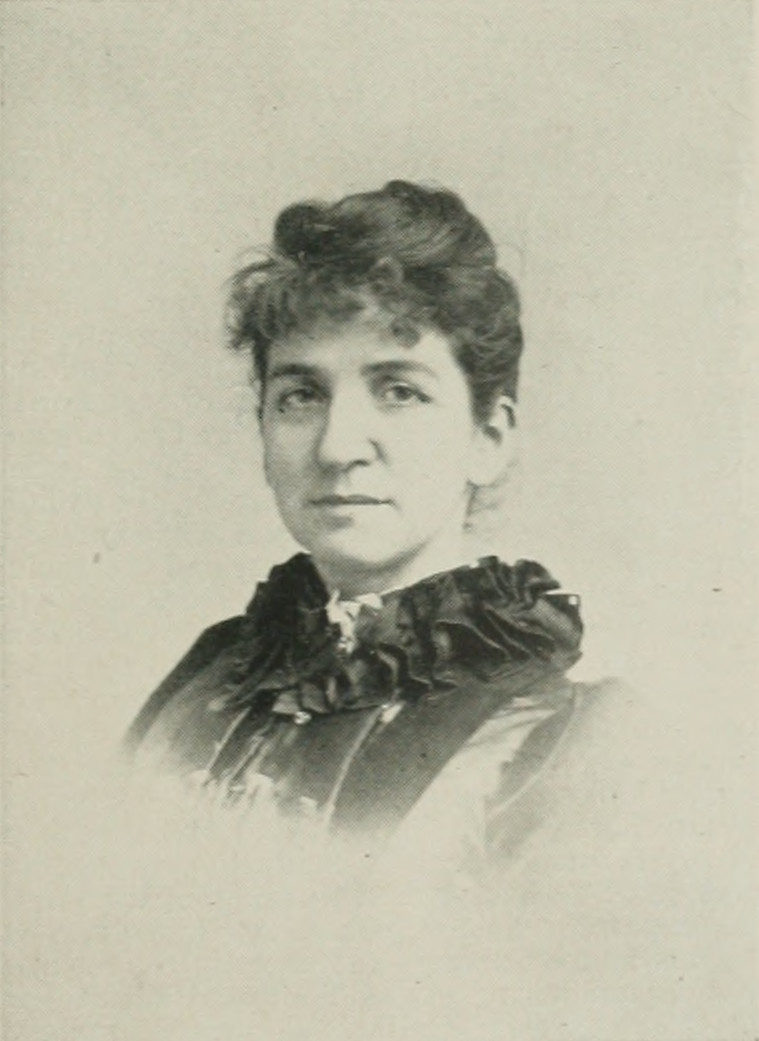
- Photo in A Woman of the Century
- Born: September 6, 1852; Rockford, Illinois, U.S.
- Died: March 10, 1897 (aged 44); Newton, Massachusetts, U.S.
- Occupations: poet; author
- Spouse: Alfred Jonathan Harwi
- Children: 3
- Writing career
- Pen name: "Trebor Ohl"

Cora Stuart Wheeler (pen name, Trebor Ohl; September 6, 1852 – March 10, 1897) was a 19th-century American poet and author. She was one of the most successful short-story writers of the day. It was during the civil war, as a girl in her father's committee-room at the Capitol, during President Lincoln's time, that ideas were formed which developed into her verse of later years. Wheeler, a well-known literary worker and journalist in her day, wrote verse, bits of humor, biographies, and racy, thrilling stories. She gave instructive, entertaining lectures, through which ran good-natured wit and purpose.

== Early life and education ==
Cora Stuart Wheeler was born in Rockford, Illinois, September 6, 1852. Her father was Buel Goodsell Wheeler (1815-1906). Her mother, Mrs. Harriet L. Norton, from whom her poetic talent was inherited, died when Cora was two years old. Both her parents were of New England birth, her mother of Scotch ancestry.

She was placed in school in the Emmitsburg, Maryland, convent, and later, in the Convent of the Visitation Nuns in Georgetown, Washington, D.C., where she passed the last years of the civil war. During the last year of the war, and, with a group of convent girls, she witnessed from a balcony the closing review of the Grand Army, whose ranks contained four of her brothers. She was with her father in Ford's Theatre, in Washington, D.C., when President Lincoln was shot. She was then sent to Howland College, Springport, New York, a school conducted under Quaker patronage.

== Career ==
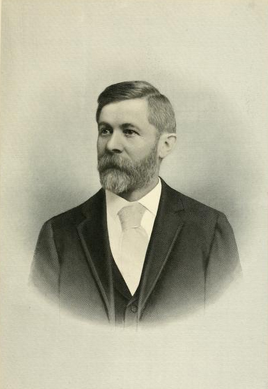
Alfred Jonathan Harwi (1916)

Eighteen months after leaving that college, she married Alfred Jonathan Harwi, a Moravian. Three children were born to them, one of whom, a daughter, Edith, survived. With Cora's father, Mr. Harwi subsequently was in the hardware and implement business in Missouri. She lived among the Moravians two years, and then moved to the Southwest.

Business failings in 1882, while in Connecticut, required her to find employment. She began to give readings, and later wrote for the Hartford Courant in the office of Charles Dudley Warner. In the summer of 1883, she wrote her first story, "Twixt cup and Lip", and its prompt acceptance by the Chicago Tribune as a prize story gave her impetus to become a writer. In that year, under the pen name "Trebor Ohl" she contributed regular articles to The Cleveland Leader, the Kansas City Journal, as well as the Detroit Post, Detroit Tribune and the Detroit Free Press. She next took up biography, and wrote brief lives of prominent women. For one year, she served as art critic on the Boston Evening Transcript.

In November, 1885, with six other women, she co-founded the New England Woman's Press Association. She was then, in addition to all other work, furnishing specials to the Boston Daily Advertiser and The Boston Record, as well as The Providence Journal. In 1886, she wrote a series of social, dramatic and literary sketches for a Chicago syndicate, the A. N. Kellogg Company, and short stories, sketches and specials for The Hartford Times, The Boston Globe, the New York Herald, and other papers, which at once found favor. She edited the Yankee Blade at that time, and furnished largely the humor for the "Portfolio" of the American Magazine.

She also became notable as a household writer. Those of her biographical sketches which appeared in the Daughters of America were to be collected for publication in book form, as were her short stories, "The Fardel's Christmas," "The Bings' Baby," "The White Arrow" and others. For six years, she wrote under her own name. Her best work, if not her most voluminous, was her poetry; but she showed a wide range of talent in all departments of prose, and preferred it. She published, from time to time, lyrics and verse in Harper's Magazine, The Century Magazine, Ladies' Home Journal , The Youth's Companion, Wide-Awake, and other literary publications.

She lectured in Boston, Hartford and New York on "Authors Whom I Have Known," "Moravians As I Lived Among Them," "Cervantes," "Legends and Superstitions" and "Fallacies of Family Life." The lectures and recitations included music.

In 1895, she was in charge of the Massachusetts building at the Cotton States and International Exposition in Atlanta.

== Personal life and death ==
Since 1882, she made her permanent home with her father and daughter in Boston, Massachusetts where she held salons. She was also a member of the Ladies' Aid Society and the Castilian Club.

Wheeler died at the Newton Hospital, in Newton, Massachusetts, March 10, 1897.
