= Abba Goold Woolson =

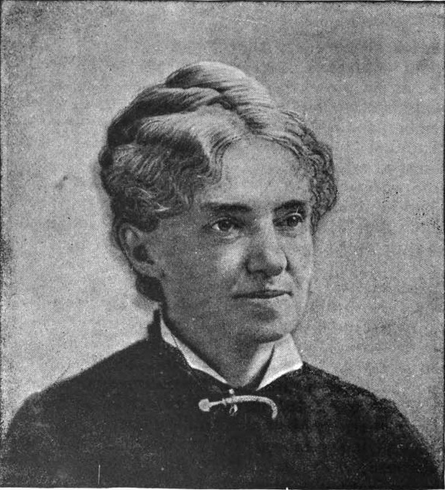
- Born: Abba Louisa Goold; April 30, 1838; Windham, Maine, US
- Died: February 6, 1921 (aged 82)
- Occupations: teacher; author; poet
- Spouse: Moses Woolson (m. 1856)

Abba Goold Woolson (née, Goold; April 30, 1838 – February 6, 1921) was a 19th-century American teacher, author, and poet from Maine. She published several volumes, including: Women in American Society (1873); Dress Reform (1874); Browsing Among Books (1881); and George Eliot and Her Heroines (1887). Woolson taught and lectured on various topics.

== Early life and education ==
Abba Louisa Goold was born in Windham, Maine, April 30, 1838, at the old homestead at Windham, 10 miles (16 km) from Portland, Maine. The second of seven children, she was the daughter of Hon. William Goold, who was recognized in Portland as an authority on matters which concern its local history. He served for years as an active member, and as corresponding secretary, of the Maine Historical Society. He was the author of several leading papers, and of a large volume entitled Portland in the Past, published in that city in 1886. For two years, he represented the Portland district in the State Legislature as senator, with a previous service of two years as representative.

Her family lived in Windham for four generations, her great-grandfather, Benjamin Goold —a native of Kittery, Maine— having moved there from Portland (then Falmouth) in 1774. He served as town treasurer; his son Nathan was justice of the peace and represented the town in the Massachusetts Legislature, when Maine was a province of that state, and was made captain of the military company raised in Gorham and Windham for service in the War of 1812. The family had a private burial ground on a nearby ridge bearing the name of "Happy Hill". Several generations of Goolds are buried there.

Woolson's education was received in the several grades of the Portland public schools, and she graduated from the Girls' High School in 1856, as valedictorian of her class.

== Career ==
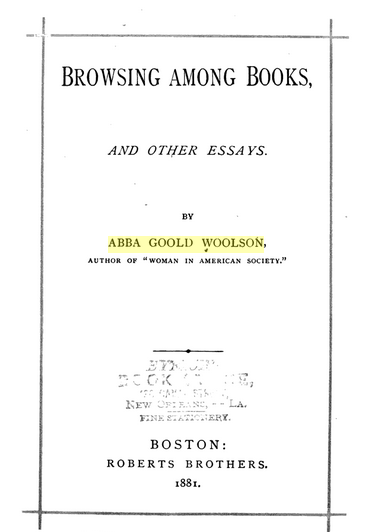
"Browsing Among Books: And Other Essays", by Abba Goold Woolson

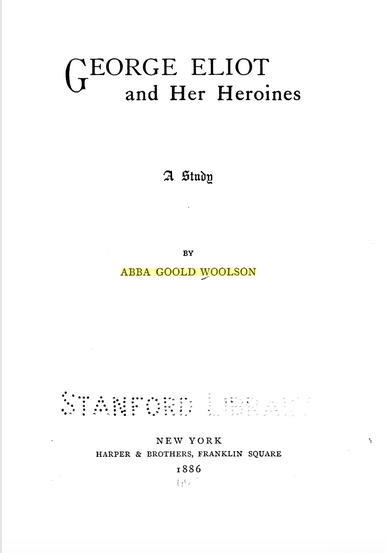
George Eliot and Her Heroines: A Study

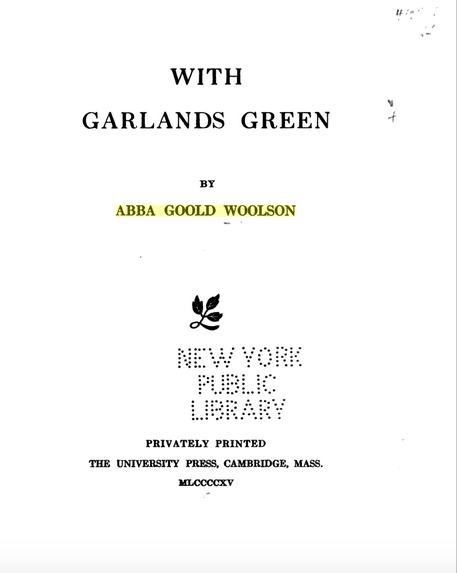
With garlands green

In 1856, she married the principal of her high school, Moses Woolson, who held this position in Portland for 13 years. In 1862, he was elected as principal of the Woodward High School, of Cincinnati, Ohio, and there the Woolsons resided until 1865. When, at the close of the American Civil War, Mr. Woolson was invited to take charge of the high school of his native city, Concord, New Hampshire, they returned to New England. A call to a mastership in the high school of Boston, drew them to that city in 1868, and there they lived for about six years, returning to Concord in 1873, for another residence in that city, this time of 13 years. From October 1887, they lived in Boston again.

For brief periods, Woolson taught her favorite subjects, acting for some months, while in Cincinnati, as Professor of Belles Lettres at the Mount Auburn Young Ladies' Institute; in Haverhill, Massachusetts, as lady principal of the high school; and as assistant in the Concord High School, where, with her husband, she taught for a while the higher mathematics and Latin. Her time was largely given to connected courses of lectures before literary societies on "English Literature in Connection with English History", on the historical plays of Shakespeare, and matters of Spanish history, scenery, and life.

In 1871, she interviewed Brigham Young in Utah for The Boston Journal. She also contributed an essay to The Boston Journal, "The Present Aspect of the Byron Case," and soon afterwards began to publish her work in volumes. In 1874, she edited "Dress-Reform", a series of lectures by women physicians of Boston on "Dress as It Affects the Health of Women". Woolson published several other volumes, including: Women in American Society (1873); Browsing Among Books (1881); and George Eliot and Her Heroines (1887).

Woolson is also remembered as a poet. When Portland, Maine celebrated its centennial in 1886, Woolson was unanimously chosen to fill the position of poet, reading a long ode on that occasion. In Concord, she delivered poems at the opening of the Board of Trade Building, of the Chapel of the Second Congregational Society, and of the Fowler Literary Building.

== Selected works ==
- 1873, Woman in American society
- 1874, Dress-reform; a series of lectures delivered in Boston, on dress as it affects the health of women
- 188?, The kindergarten, what is it?
- 1881, Browsing among books, and other essays
- 1886, George Eliot and Her Heroines
- 1886, Centennial poem. Delivered at Portland, July 6, 1886
- 1889, Exercises at the dedication of the Fowler Library Building, Concord, New Hampshire, October 18, 1888
- 1915, With garlands green

== Personal life ==
In Boston, Woolson was a member of several literary and benevolent associations, and was especially active in the Castilian Club, having served as president. In 1883–1884, she traveled for 13 months, spending a summer in Ireland, Wales, Scotland and England, also visiting Austria, Hungary, Southern Italy, Spain, and Morocco. In previous years, she had traveled to the Pacific Coast and Yosemite Valley. Woolson died in 1921.
