= New England Women's Club =

The New England Women's Club (est. May 1868) of Boston, Massachusetts, was one of the two earliest women's clubs in the United States, having been founded a couple of months after Sorosis in New York City.

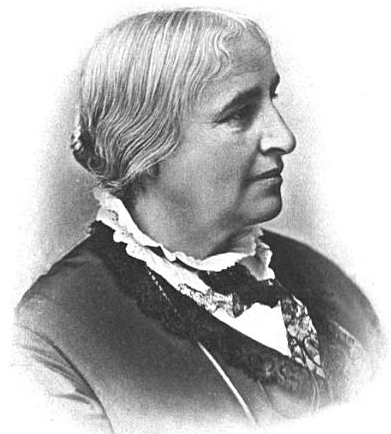
Portrait of Ednah Cheney, one of the club's founders

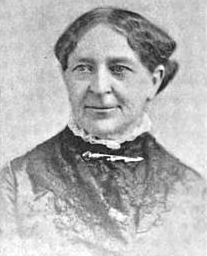
Portrait of Caroline Severance, one of the club's founders

== History ==
Harriet Hanson Robinson, founder of the National Woman Suffrage Association of Massachusetts, and suffragist Caroline Severance worked with Julia Ward Howe to organize the club.

In 1868, "club rooms were first secured in ... the rear of the popular Tremont House. On May 30, 1868, the first meeting to introduce the New England Woman's Club to the public was held in Chickering Hall." The club incorporated in 1887; Sarah H. Bradford, Ednah Dow Littlehale Cheney, Lucy Goddard, Abby W. May, L. M. Peabody, Harriet M. Pittman, Harriet Winslow Sewall, and Kate Gannett Wells served as signatories. By 1893, some 340 members belonged to the club. Publisher and activist Josephine St. Pierre Ruffin was the first African-American woman to join the organization, when she joined in the mid-1890s.

Although the club was run by and for women, men were allowed to join. A few men had attended the initial meeting, including Ralph Waldo Emerson, James Freeman Clarke, Octavius Brooks Frothingham, Thomas Wentworth Higginson, and Amos Bronson Alcott. Of these, Emerson, Clarke, and Higginson all became members.

At this time, in Boston, there existed a few other clubs for women, including "the Saturday Morning Club, the Brains Club and the Young Ladies Club, the members of which are in general high-toned persons, interested in intellectual and philanthropic matters." The goal of the New England Women's Club was to "provide a suitable place of meeting in Boston for the convenience of its members, and to promote social enjoyment and general improvement." Committees oversaw club activities with regard to "Art and Literature," "Discussions," "Education," and "Work." "Monday Teas" were held every week. In its first year, club members set about organizing a horticultural school.

Lectures occurred frequently, given by both club members and invited speakers. Among the many lecturers in the club's first decades were: Louis Agassiz, Amos Bronson Alcott, George Thorndike Angell, Richard Henry Dana Jr., Ralph Waldo Emerson, Annie Adams Fields, James T. Fields, William Lloyd Garrison, Edward Everett Hale, Thomas Wentworth Higginson, Oliver Wendell Holmes Sr., Henry James, and Mary Tyler Peabody Mann.

== Buildings ==
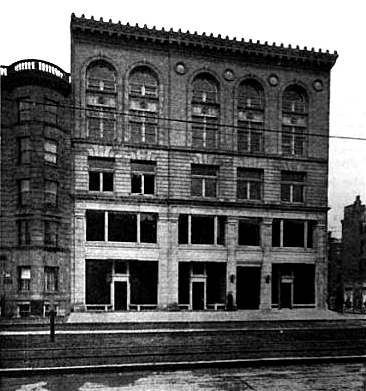
New Century Building, Huntington Ave., Boston; club headquarters, ca. 1903

Around 1903, the club moved its headquarters from Park Street to the newly constructed New Century Building on Huntington Avenue, designed by architect Josephine Wright Chapman. In 1909, the club moved into the newly constructed Chauncy Hall Building at 585 Boylston Street, and it was there as late as 1922.

== Notable members ==
- Ednah Dow Littlehale Cheney
- Adelaide Avery Claflin
- Sarah Stoddard Eddy
- Julia Ward Howe
- Harriet Ann Jacobs
- Rebecca Richardson Joslin
- Mary Livermore
- Lucretia Mott
- Elizabeth Palmer Peabody
- Harriet Hanson Robinson
- Josephine St. Pierre Ruffin
- Caroline Severance
- Harriet Winslow Sewall
- Lucy Stone
- May Alden Ward
- Kate Gannett Wells
