= List of Illinois suffragists =

This is a list of Illinois suffragists, suffrage groups and others associated with the cause of women's suffrage in Illinois.

== Groups ==
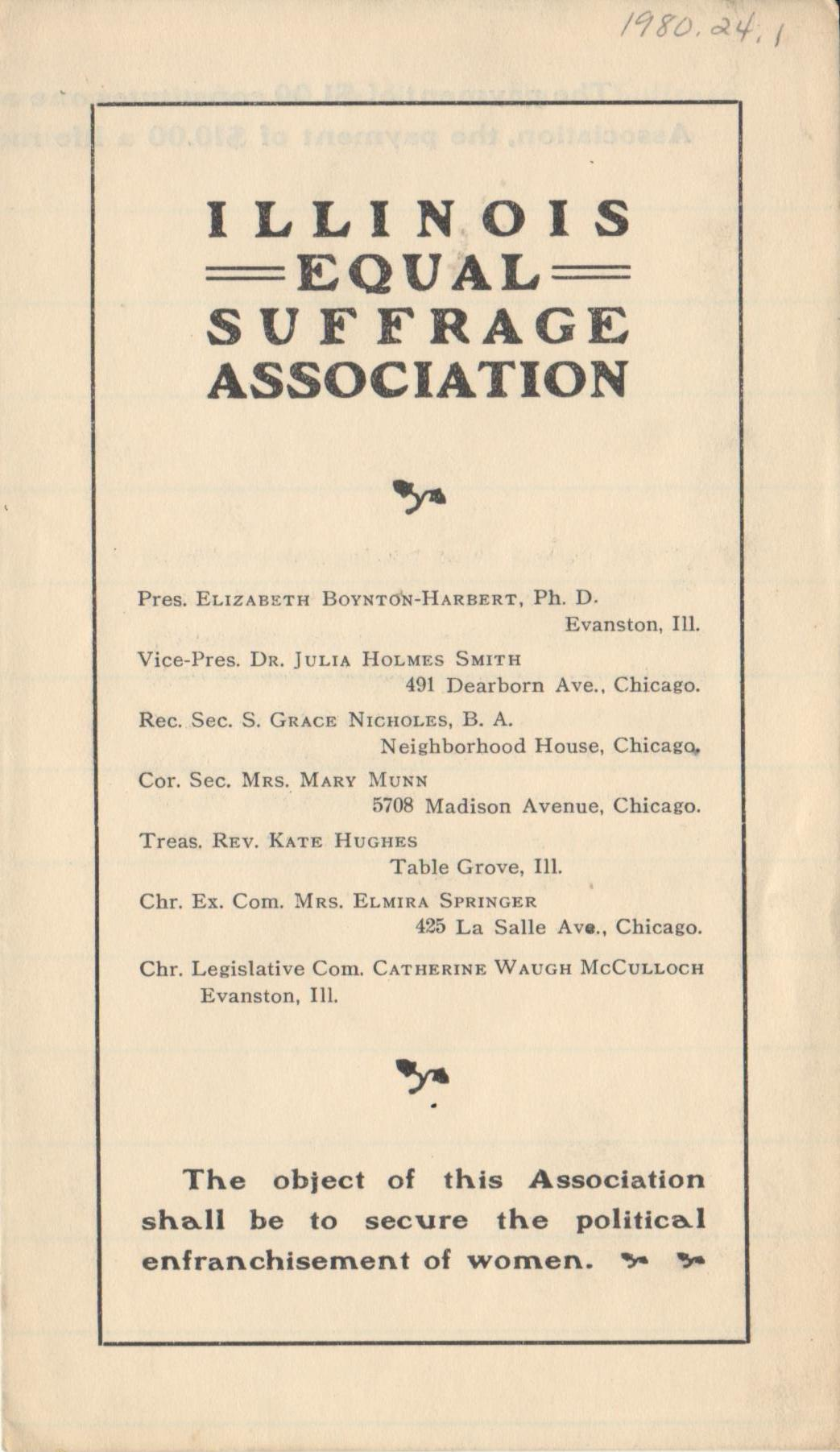
Illinois Equal Suffrage Association pamphlet, 1903

- Alpha Suffrage Club, formed in 1913.
- Chicago Equal Suffrage Association, formerly the North Side Branch of IESA, created in 1910.
- Chicago Political Equality League, formed in 1894.
- Chicago Teachers' Federation.
- Chicago Woman's Club.
- Cook County Woman's Suffrage Society.
- Decatur Women's Suffrage Club, formed in 1888.
- Democratic Club of Chicago, formed in 1900.
- Earlville Suffrage Association, formed in 1855.
- Ella Flagg Young Club.
- Illinois Equal Franchise Society.
- Illinois Federation of Colored Women's Clubs.
- Illinois Federation of Women's Clubs.
- Illinois Woman Suffrage Association (IWSA), formed in 1869, later renamed Illinois Equal Suffrage Association (IESA).
- Men's Equal Suffrage League, formed in 1909.
- Naperville Equal Suffrage Club, created in 1888.
- National Woman's Party.
- The Ossoli Club, formed in Highland Park, Illinois, in 1894.
- Sorosis.
- Springfield Suffrage Association.
- Women's Christian Temperance Union (WCTU) of Illinois.
- Women's Trade Union League (WTUL).

== Suffragists ==
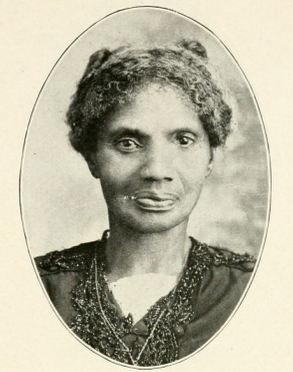
Susan E. Allen Cannon of Galeburg, Illinois, in 1922

- Sadie Lewis Adams (Chicago).
- Jane Addams.
- Mary A. Ahrens (Chicago).
- Royal Allen.
- Susan E. Allen Cannon (Galesburg).
- Naomi Talbert Anderson (Chicago).
- Susan Look Avery (Chicago).
- Rosa Miller Avery (1830–1894) – American abolitionist, political reformer, suffragist, writer. (Chicago).
- Eugenia M. Bacon.
- Laura Beasley (Chicago).
- Ella G. Berry (Chicago).
- Kizziah J. Bills (Chicago).
- Anna Blount (Oak Park).
- Elizabeth K. Booth (Glencoe).
- Louise DeKoven Bowen (Chicago).
- Myra Colby Bradwell.
- Sophonisba Breckinridge (Chicago).
- Virginia Brooks (Chicago).
- Adella Maxwell Brown (Peoria).
- Laura Robinson Campbell (East St. Louis)
- Agnes Chase.
- Mary C. Clarke (Chicago).
- George E. Cole (Chicago).
- Lydia Avery Coonley-Ward (Chicago).
- Prudence Crandall.
- Caroline Bartlett Crane (Chicago).
- Gertrude Crocker (Hinsdale).
- Ruth Crocker (Hinsdale).
- Susan Lawrence Dana (Sangamon County).
- Cornelia De Bey (Chicago).
- Margaret Dobyne.
- Kate N. Doggett (Chicago).
- Elvira Downey (Clinton).
- Ida Darling Engelke (Chicago).
- Elizabeth Hawley Everett (Highland Park).
- Lucy H. Ewing (Chicago).
- Janet Kellogg Fairbank (Chicago).
- Samuel Fallows (Chicago).
- Clara M. Farson (St. Charles).
- Henry B. Favill (Chicago).
- Lucy Flower.
- Antoinette Funk (Chicago).
- Sophie Gibb (Decatur).
- Catherine Goggin (Chicago).
- Harriet Grim (Chicago).
- Emily M. Gross.
- Alonzo Jackson Grover (Earlville).
- Elizabeth Boynton Harbert (Evanston).
- Margaret Haley (Chicago).
- Effie Henderson (Bloomington).
- Mary Emma Holmes (Chicago)
- Carrie S. Cook Horton (Chicago).
- Kate Hughes (Table Grove).
- Alta Hulett.
- Adelaide Johnson.
- Carrie Ashton Johnson (Rockford).
- Mary Jane Richardson Jones (Chicago).
- Jenkin Lloyd Jones (Chicago).
- Lillian G. Kohlhamer (Chicago).
- Florence E. Kollock (Chicago).
- Mary H. Krout (Chicago).
- Maydie Spaulding Lee (Springfield).
- Lena Morrow Lewis (Chicago).
- Mary Livermore.
- Elizabeth F. Long (Barry).
- Judith Weil Loewenthal (Chicago).
- Andrew MacLeish (Chicago).
- Anna A. Maley.
- Ellen A. Martin (Lombard).
- Mary Mather (Sangamon County).
- Catharine Waugh McCulloch (Evanston).
- J. Howard Moore (Chicago).
- Mary Foulke Morrisson (Chicago).
- Henry Neil (Chicago).
- Agnes Nestor (Chicago).
- Anna E. Nicholes (Chicago).
- S. Grace Nicholes (Chicago).
- Maude Gregg Palmer (Springfield).
- Fannie H. Rastall.
- Harriet Reed (Springfield).
- Susan Hoxie Richardson (Earlville).
- Mabel Sippy (Chicago).
- Julia Holmes Smith.
- Eva Munson Smith.
- Elmira E. Springer.
- Belle Squire (Chicago).
- Ida Staggall.
- Helen Ekin Starrett (Chicago).
- Ella S. Stewart.
- Mary Thomas.
- Anna Willard Timmeus (Chicago).
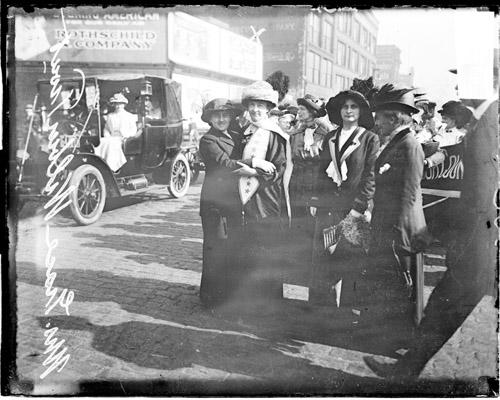
  Grace Wilbur Trout (marked with x) after her return from Springfield and the campaign for women's votes, June 14, 1913
- Helen Todd (Chicago).
- Grace Wilbur Trout (Oak Park).
- Elsie Unterman (Chicago).
- Mary L. Walker.
- Clara Barck Welles (Chicago).
- Ida B. Wells (Chicago).
- Frances Willard.
- Fannie Barrier Williams (Chicago).
- Jennie Willing (Rockford).

=== Politicians supporting women's suffrage ===
- Martin B. Bailey.
- Charles Bogardus.
- James Bradwell.
- Charles H. Carmon (Forrest).
- Orrin N. Carter.
- Miles B. Castle.
- Albert C. Clark.
- Michael H. Cleary.
- William A. Compton.
- Reuben W. Coon.
- John M. Curran.
- Edward C. Curtis.
- George W. Curtis.
- Samuel A. Ettelson.
- Isaiah T. Greenacre.
- George W. Harris.
- Logan Hay.
- Hugh S. Magill.
- Walter Clyde Jones.
- Kent E. Keller.
- Walter I. Manny.
- Medill McCormick.
- Willard McEwen.
- Thomas J. McMillan.
- Fayette S. Munro (Highland Park).
- Barratt O'Hara.
- W. Duff Piercy.
- Murray F. Tuley.
- Richards S. Tuthill.
- Emil N. Zolla (Chicago).

== Places ==
- Leland Hotel (Springfield).
- Pick-Congress Hotel (Chicago).

== Publications ==
- The Agitator, created in 1869.

== Suffragists campaigning in Illinois ==
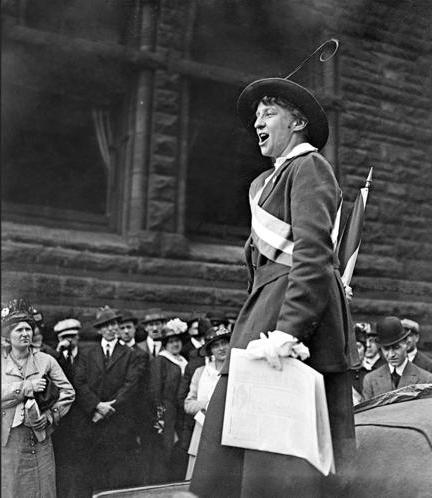
Mabel Vernon speaks on the corner of E. Van Buren St and South Michigan Ave in Chicago on June 16, 1916

- Susan B. Anthony.
- Henry B. Blackwell.
- Celia Burleigh.
- Carrie Chapman Catt.
- Miriam M. Cole.
- Phoebe Couzins.
- Emma Smith DeVoe.
- Margaret Foley.
- Helen M. Gougar.
- Mary Garrett Hay.
- Isabella Beecher Hooker.
- Julia Ward Howe.
- Elizabeth A. Kingsbury.
- Emmeline Pankhurst.
- Lilly Peckham.
- Mary Whitney Phelps.
- Parker Pillsbury.
- Anna Howard Shaw.
- Ethel Snowden.
- Elizabeth Cady Stanton.
- Lucy Stone.
- Mabel Vernon.
- Zerelda G. Wallace.

== Anti-suffragists ==
=== Groups ===
- Illinois Association Opposed to the Extension of Suffrage to Women, formed in 1897.

=== People ===
- Anton J. Cermak (Chicago).
- Caroline Fairfield Corbin (Chicago).
- Levy Mayer (Chicago).
- Emma Susan Gillett Oglesby (Elkhart).
- S. M. Nickerson
- J. C. Fairfield
- Geo. W. Smith
- Ralph N. Isham
- A. T. Galt
- WM. Eliot Furness
- Francis Lackner
- Mary Pomeroy Green

== See also ==
- Timeline of women's suffrage in Illinois
- Women's suffrage in Illinois
- Women's suffrage in states of the United States
- Women's suffrage in the United States
