= Women's suffrage in Illinois =

History of women's right to vote in the state

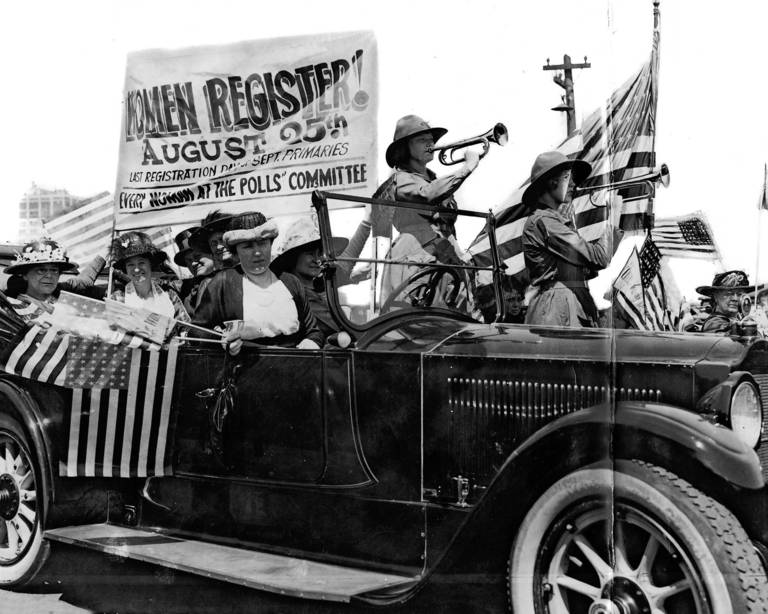
League of Women Voters members parade in Chicago in August 1920

Women's suffrage began in Illinois began in the mid-1850s. The first women's suffrage group was formed in Earlville, Illinois, by the cousin of Susan B. Anthony, Susan Hoxie Richardson. After the Civil War, former abolitionist Mary Livermore organized the Illinois Woman Suffrage Association (IWSA), which would later be renamed the Illinois Equal Suffrage Association (IESA). Frances Willard and other suffragists in the IESA worked to lobby various government entities for women's suffrage. In the 1870s, women were allowed to serve on school boards and were elected to that office. The first women to vote in Illinois were 15 women in Lombard, Illinois, led by Ellen A. Martin, who found a loophole in the law in 1891. Women were eventually allowed to vote for school offices in the 1890s. Women in Chicago and throughout Illinois fought for the right to vote based on the idea of no taxation without representation. They also continued to expand their efforts throughout the state. In 1913, women in Illinois were successful in gaining partial suffrage. They became the first women east of the Mississippi River to have the right to vote in presidential elections. Suffragists then worked to register women to vote. Both African-American and white suffragists registered women in huge numbers. In Chicago alone 200,000 women were registered to vote. After gaining partial suffrage, women in Illinois kept working towards full suffrage. The state became the first to ratify the Nineteenth Amendment, passing the ratification on June 10, 1919. The League of Women Voters (LWV) was announced in Chicago on February 14, 1920.

== Early efforts ==
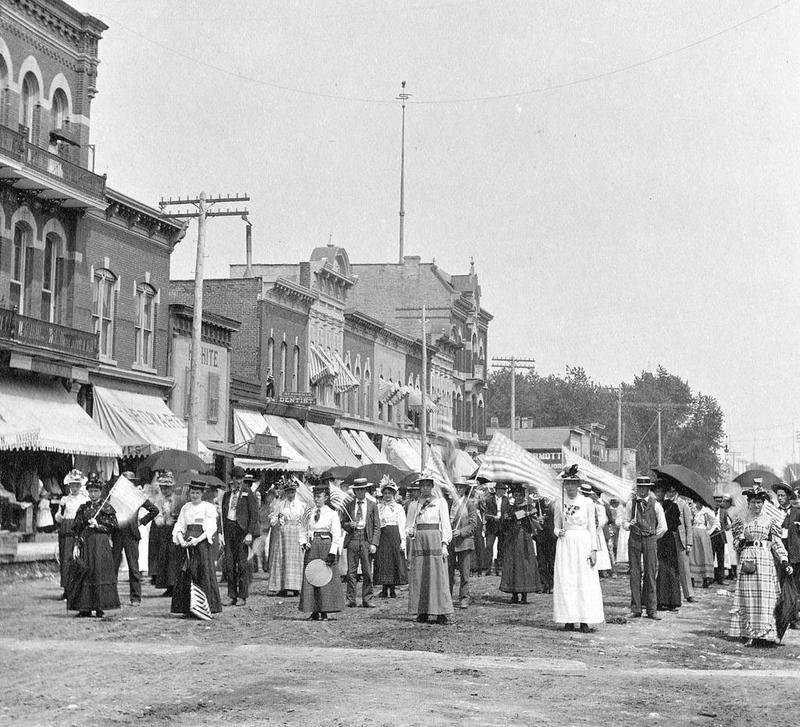
Suffragists march in Decoration Day parade in DeKalb in 1892

The first women's suffrage group in Illinois was created by Susan B. Anthony's cousin, Susan Hoxie Richardson. Richardson created the Earlville Suffrage Association in 1855. Richardson had heard the women's suffrage speech given by lawyer and editor of the Earlville Transcript, Alonzo Jackson Grover, earlier that year. Grover's paper often published articles on the abolition movement and women's suffrage. Grover's wife, Octavia Grover, became the secretary of the Earlville Suffrage Association.

When the Civil War broke out, women in Illinois helped to provide supplies to soldiers and hospitals. Working with the war effort convinced abolitionist, Mary Livermore, that women needed to have the right to vote in order to enact political reform.

Livermore organized the first women's suffrage convention in Illinois. It took place in Chicago at Library Hall in February in 1869. Susan B. Anthony and Elizabeth Cady Stanton spoke at the convention. Mary Whitney Phelps of St. Louis, Missouri, also spoke during the convention. Naomi Talbert Anderson spoke about the need to include African-American women in the conversation about women's suffrage. During this convention, the Illinois Woman Suffrage Association (IWSA) was created.

At the same time as Livermore's group was meeting, another suffrage convention was being held by Sorosis in Chicago. The Chicago Tribune made fun of the situation and implied that the women weren't able to properly plan conventions. Mrs. D. L. Waterman of Sorosis replied to the Tribune, explaining how the conventions had happened at the same time and provided letters between herself and Livermore.

After the convention, Livermore started a suffrage newspaper called The Agitator. The first issue came out on March 13, 1869. The newspaper featured articles about women's rights and empowerment. After Livermore moved to Boston with her family in 1870, she merged The Agitator with the Woman's Journal.

IWSA held their annual convention in the capital of Illinois, Springfield in February 1870. Frances Willard and other members of IWSA lobbied the Illinois Constitutional Convention being held there for women's suffrage. Other women later petitioned against women's suffrage, presenting petitions from around the state. In the end, only adult males, including Black men, were only enfranchised. Willard had been involved with the Women's Christian Temperance Union (WCTU), first joining in 1874. She became the second president of WCTU and encouraged the group to support women's suffrage.

Suffragists in Illinois began to lobby for a change in the law, instead of a state constitutional amendment. Women's rights activists and politicians like Alta Hulett, Myra Colby Bradwell and Judge James Bradwell worked to improve the lives and political standing of women in the state. Judge Bradwell served as a president of IWSA and Myra Bradwell was a secretary in 1871. Judge Bradwell helped pass a rule allowing women to serve on school boards. The next year saw ten women elected as County Superintendents of schools. In 1879, Willard brought a petition to the General Assembly requesting that women have the right to vote on alcohol-related issues.

Sophie Gibbs, a Universalist Minister, created the Decatur Women's Suffrage Club on July 30, 1888. Around one hundred women in Decatur, Illinois came together to work towards women's suffrage.

IWSA changed their name to the Illinois Equal Suffrage Association (IESA) in 1890. However, the group is sometimes still referred to by the old name. Catharine Waugh McCulloch becomes the legislative superintendent of IESA and begins lobbying the Illinois General Assembly for women's suffrage legislation.

In 1891, IESA persuaded politicians to introduce a women's suffrage amendment in the state legislature. George W. Curtis introduced a bill in the House and Charles Bogardus worked on the Senate version. The bill for the amendment didn't pass, but it helped make the later passage of a school suffrage bill easier. The school suffrage bill was written by the WCTU and was introduced in the state Senate by Thomas C. MacMillan where it easily passed. The bill also passed by a large majority in the House. The school suffrage bill was confusing and led to four different Supreme Court of Illinois decisions to determine the scope of the law. In some situations, women were not given ballots at voting places or even ballot-boxes and had to provide their own. In the end, it was decided that women could only vote on school offices created by the state legislature.

Also in 1891, Ellen A. Martin found a loophole in the city charter of Lombard, Illinois that could allow her and other women to legally vote. The charter stated that "all citizens" could vote and did not specify gender. Martin, a lawyer, demanded her right to vote on April 6, 1891. Fourteen other women who lived in Lombard also wished to vote. After appealing to judges, the votes were tabulated and became the first 15 votes cast by women in Illinois.

== Further growth ==
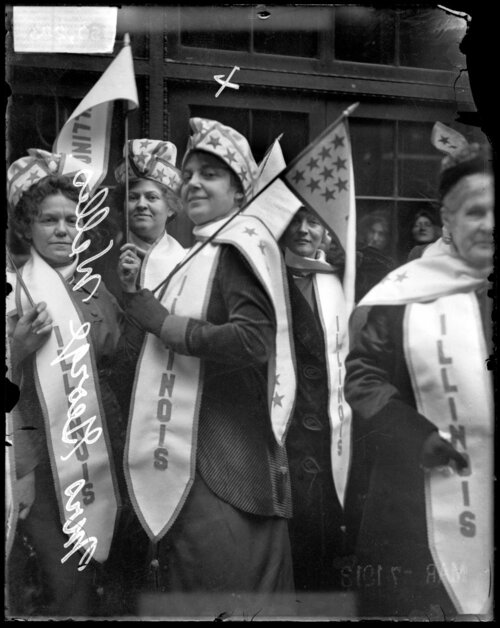
Clara Welles in Chicago, preparing to leave for the Suffrage March in Washington, D.C., March 1913

IESA worked to publicize the issue of women paying taxes without representation in 1901. The group published and distributed a leaflet called "Suffrage for Women Taxpayers." Members of the Chicago Teachers' Federation, under the leadership of Margaret Haley and Catherine Goggin, helped raise awareness for women's suffrage. In the next years, suffragists worked to get the History of Woman Suffrage in library collections. Suffragists also managed to get more women's clubs in the state interested in women's suffrage. The Illinois Federation of Women's Clubs (IFWC) started to endorse municipal suffrage bills. Further outreach to colleges and other venues to organize suffrage groups was done by Alice Henry and Elmira E. Springer. Springer donated $1,000 to use for prizes in the annual "inter-collegiate oratorical suffrage contest."

In 1906, Chicago held a Charter Convention to revise their municipal charter. Members of the convention were men, but women worked to influence the changes in the convention. Women of all classes and social status in the city worked together to help advocate for city improvements. They also tried to get women's suffrage included, but were unsuccessful. Nevertheless, IESA sent delegates from women's clubs to Springfield to support the passage of the bill in 1909. While the bill didn't pass, the networks developed in the creation of the bill had long-lasting effects on women's influence in political areas in Chicago.

In October 1909, IESA held its annual convention. At the convention, the first Men's Equal Suffrage League was formed. Grace Wilbur Trout worked with prominent men in Chicago as the newly elected president of the Chicago Political Equality League in 1910. Not only did she lobby, but she also got new ideas from working with the politicians, and started a women's suffrage auto tour in July 1910. They were able to get the Winton Motor Company of Oak Park to donate cars and a chauffeur. Trout publicized the tours with newspapers who sent journalists by train and trolley to cover the speeches in sixteen different cities. Along with Trout, Anna E. Blount, Catherine Waugh McCulloch, and others toured the cities in a "suffrage by relay" plan. The suffragists visited Aurora, Belvidere, DeKalb, Elgin, Evanston, Geneva, Gray Lake, Highland Park, Lake Forest, McHenry, Marengo, Naperville, Waukengan, Wheaton, and Woodstock. Trout also worked to create local suffrage clubs in each state senator's district.

In October 1910, IESA held their convention in Elgin, Illinois. Some members of IESA under the direction of McCulloch, went to Springfield in order to lobby the General Assembly. One thing Trout discovered while visiting the IESA members in Springfield, was that there was still hostility to women's suffrage. McCulloch passed the job onto Elizabeth K. Booth in 1911. Trout and Booth came up with an educational plan that was quiet and would not draw a large opposition. They also created a card-catalog database with information about the views and personal lives of all of the members of the General Assembly. The database gave them the information they needed to more effectively lobby the legislators. Trout wanted to identify legislators who may be friendly to women's suffrage. Also in 1911, the Chicago Political Equality League outgrew its headquarters in the Chicago Woman's Club and moved to the Fine Arts Building.

In January 1913, the Alpha Suffrage Club, the first Black suffrage organization in Illinois, was formed. Alice Paul and Lucy Burns were organizing the Woman Suffrage Procession in Washington, D.C. Trout served as the leader of the 83 Illinois suffragists participating in the Woman Suffrage Procession on March 3, 1913. Trout's group practiced drilling and had "cap and baldric" uniforms designed by Clara Barck Welles. The Illinois delegation asked parade organizers if African-American marchers were welcome. When they didn't receive an answer, Ida B. Wells came with the other suffragists. Wells represented the Alpha Suffrage Club. When the suffragists rehearsed the parade, organizers ordered the Black marchers to segregate. They wanted Wells to walk at the end of the procession. A "sometimes heated and emotional debate" took place, with some Illinois suffragists threatening not to march if Wells could not march. Wells said, "If the Illinois women do not take a stand now in this great democratic parade then the colored women are lost." Trout tried to intercede so that she could march with the other Illinois women, but was rebuffed. Alice Paul, the leader of the Procession, did not see the importance of integrating and she was worried about offending white Southerners. While the suffragists were trying to decide what to do, Wells disappeared. When the march started, Wells joined the white Illinois suffragists and marched alongside Virginia Brooks, and Belle Squire . Illinois was one of four states whose suffragists marched as "integrated units."

== Partial Suffrage ==
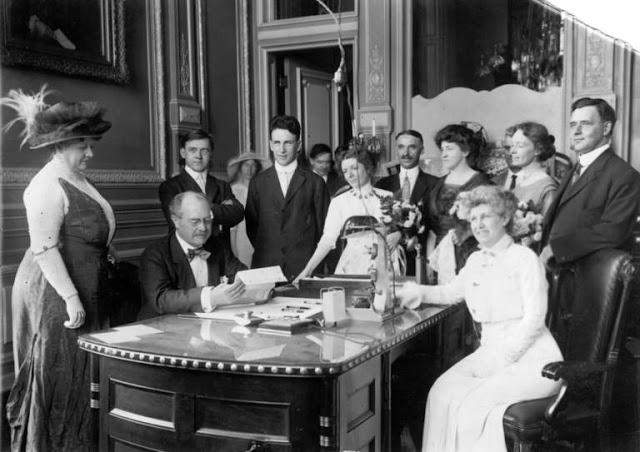
Governor Edward F. Dunne signs the Suffrage Bill in Illinois, June 26, 1913. Mrs. Dunne is to the left and Speaker William B. McKinley is to the right. Suffragists standing are Grace Wilbur Trout, Elizabeth Booth, and Antoinette Funk. Seated is Margaret Haley.

The 1913 session of the General Assembly opened with a several weeks' long struggle for the role of Speaker of the House. Booth spent the time learning to recognize each legislator in the Assembly. Eventually, William B. McKinley (Illinois state legislator) was elected as Speaker. Members of the Progressive Party wanted to bring forth a women's suffrage bill, but Trout and Booth convinced them that it would be better if IESA sponsor a bill in order to keep the issue independent of political party. McCulloch used her own, more specific draft of a women's suffrage bill. McKinley helped the suffragists by giving the bill to a committee that would report favorably on the bill. He also warned Trout that if there was no public support for the bill, he would not bring it up for a final vote. Trout called on her network of suffragists and McKinley received an average of one phone call in support of women's suffrage every fifteen minutes when he was in Chicago. He was called both at the office and at home. On his return to Springfield, there was a pile of telegrams and letters waiting for him. Women in different parts of the state were organized by Trout to call their own local legislators. Trout consulted with Governor Edward Fitzsimmons Dunne on the suffrage bill on March 10. Dunne promised to support the bill provisionally. Starting on April 7, Trout went to Springfield every week to stay in touch with legislators. She started to regularly attend sessions of the legislature. The Chicago press, and eventually the Springfield press, was supportive of the women's suffrage effort. Suffragists used the articles printed in the news and placed them on the desks of legislators.

The bill was introduced to the Senate first and passed on May 7. On May 13, Antoinette Funk came to Springfield to help with the suffrage effort. The House voted on the bill on June 11. During this vote, Trout waited at the door and encouraged legislators favorable to the bill to stay for the vote while she also prevented anti-suffragists from illegally entering. The House doorkeeper was against women's suffrage so Trout's presence there was important. The bill passed with a wild outburst of applause. Anti-suffragists immediately began to lobby Governor Dunne to veto the bill as soon as it passed the house. Mrs. Medill McCormick went to Chicago to get lawyers' legal opinions on the bill to show it was constitutional. On June 13, the suffragists held a celebratory banquet at the Leland Hotel. The bill was signed on June 26. Women in Illinois were now able to vote for presidential electors and any local office not named by the state constitution. Illinois became the first state to the east of the Mississippi River to give women the right to vote for the President. Unfortunately, the fight to give Illinois women the vote had depleted the funds of suffragists.

On July 1, 1913, a car parade took place on Michigan Boulevard. Suffragists in Illinois now had to raise awareness about voting and how to vote. William Randolph Hearst offered the suffragists a chance to publish a suffrage edition of the Chicago Examiner at no cost to any of their organization. The paper, produced by the suffragists with Antoinette Funk as managing editor, helped raise $15,000 and filled their depleted bank accounts. Suffragists also raised money through a "Self-Denial Fund." Suffragists were asked to give up items such as a favorite food or "pretty laces" on National Self-Denial Day, August 15, 1914, and put the money they would have spent on the items towards the suffrage fund.

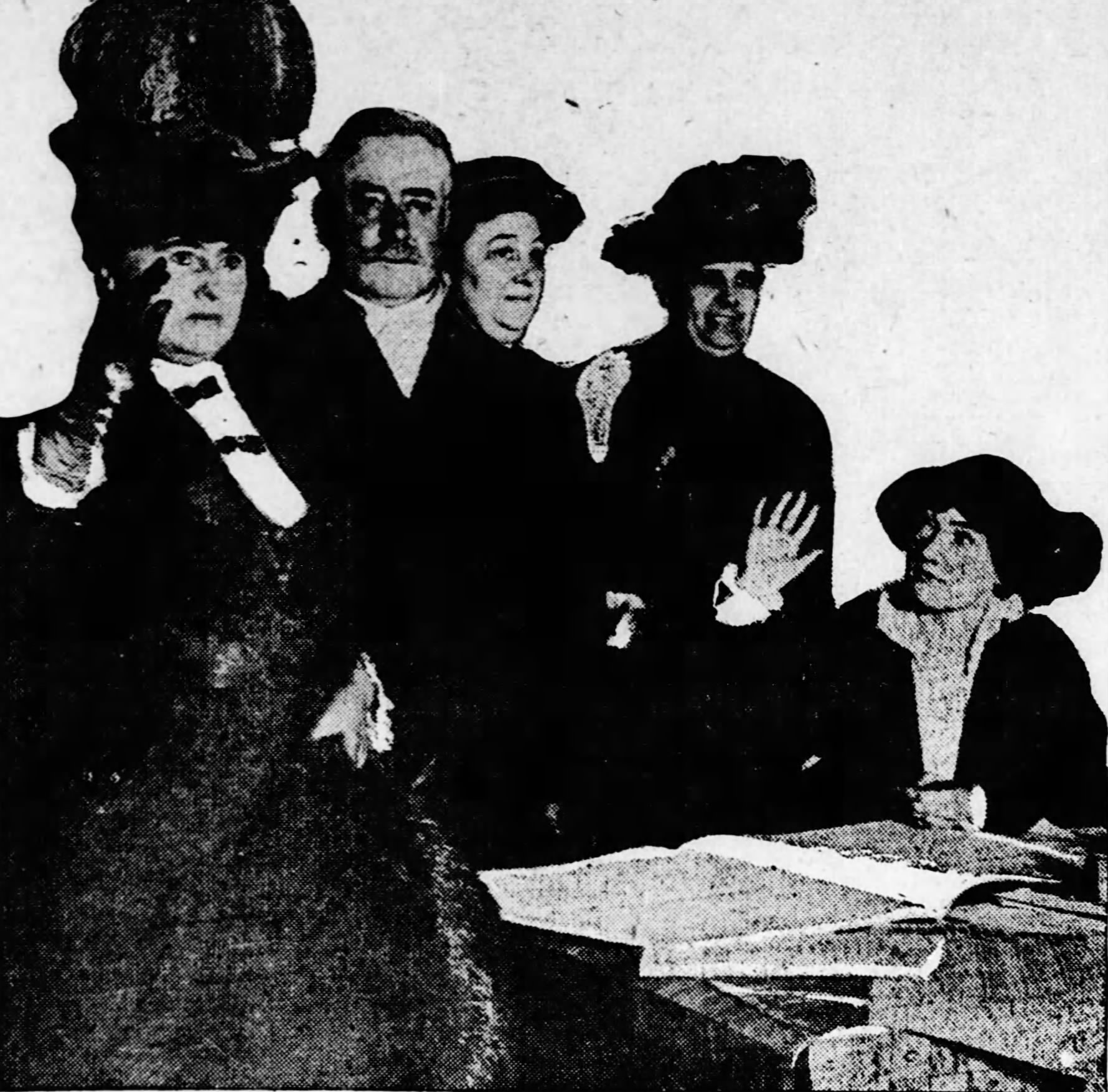
Registration of women voters in Chicago on February 3, 1914. Among those photographed are Edith Ogden Harrison (far left) and her husband, Chicago Mayor Carter Harrison IV (second from left)

Anti-suffragists and liquor interests continued to attack the constitutionality of the new law. A case was brought that went before the Supreme Court of Illinois. Money was raised to help fight the case on behalf of the suffragists. While the case was being decided, suffragists wanted to show that women truly wanted to vote. They needed to register women to vote before the next election in April 1914.

Anti-suffragists said that "not 25,000 women will register in Chicago." Suffragists in Illinois saw the importance of beating that number. Mrs. Edward L. Stewart and Judith Weil Lowenthal worked with women's clubs in Chicago to get women to register to vote. The Alpha Suffrage Club canvassed Chicago neighborhoods in get out the vote campaigns in Black neighborhoods and even reached out to female prisoners about voting. Through the work of suffragists and clubwomen, more than 200,000 women were registered to vote in Chicago alone.

== Work continues and ratification ==
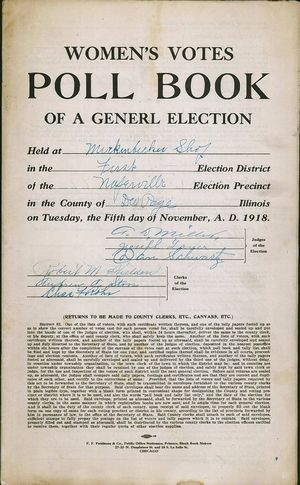
Illinois Women's Votes Poll Book, November 5, 1918

Chicago held a large suffrage parade on May 2, 1914, where around 15,000 women marched down Michigan Boulevard. Governor Dunne and the mayor of Chicago, Carter Harrison IV participated in the parade. Nearly a thousand suffragists were invited to the La Salle Hotel for food, music and speeches. The parade showed that it was important for Illinois women to keep fighting for equal suffrage.

During the 1916 Republican National Convention in Chicago, suffragists marched in a "rainy day suffrage parade" which was sponsored by NAWSA. The Woman's Party Convention in Chicago also took place in June 1916. The convention was held at the Blackstone Theater at the same time as the Republican convention. There were more than 11,000 attendees at the convention which eventually formed the National Women's Party (NWP). NWP planned to focus on pursuing a federal women's suffrage amendment. There was tension between the march organizers and women involved with forming NWP. NAWSA didn't want the NWP convention to take place at the same time as their march. The march started just as Republican delegates were leaving the convention. It was pouring rain, but the women still marched with umbrellas, raincoats and song. The end of the march had Carrie Chapman Catt give Senator William Borah the suffrage plank that NAWSA had prepared for the convention. This plank was subsequently adopted by the Republican convention.

When the United States entered World War I in 1917, suffragists in Illinois stepped up to help the war effort. Trout worked as part of the leadership of the Women's Council of National Defense. In that year, Trout also worked with Catt in Washington, D.C., to help work on the federal amendment for women's suffrage.

Several states competed to become the first to ratify the Nineteenth Amendment. Illinois ratified the amendment on June 10, 1919. Illinois beat the state of Wisconsin by only an hour and also beat Michigan, who ratified the same day. In the Senate, the amendment was ratified unanimously and in the House, only 3 legislators voted against. Suffragists packed the General Assembly gallery and unfurled suffrage banners when the amendment was passed. While Illinois voted first, the state of Wisconsin was the first state to finalize the ratification process.

NAWSA held their Victory Convention in Chicago on February 14, 1920. On that day, Catt created the League of Women Voters (LWV). Illinois suffragist and artist, Adelaide Johnson, unveiled her women's suffrage monument in Washington, D.C., on February 6, 1921.

== African-American women's suffrage ==
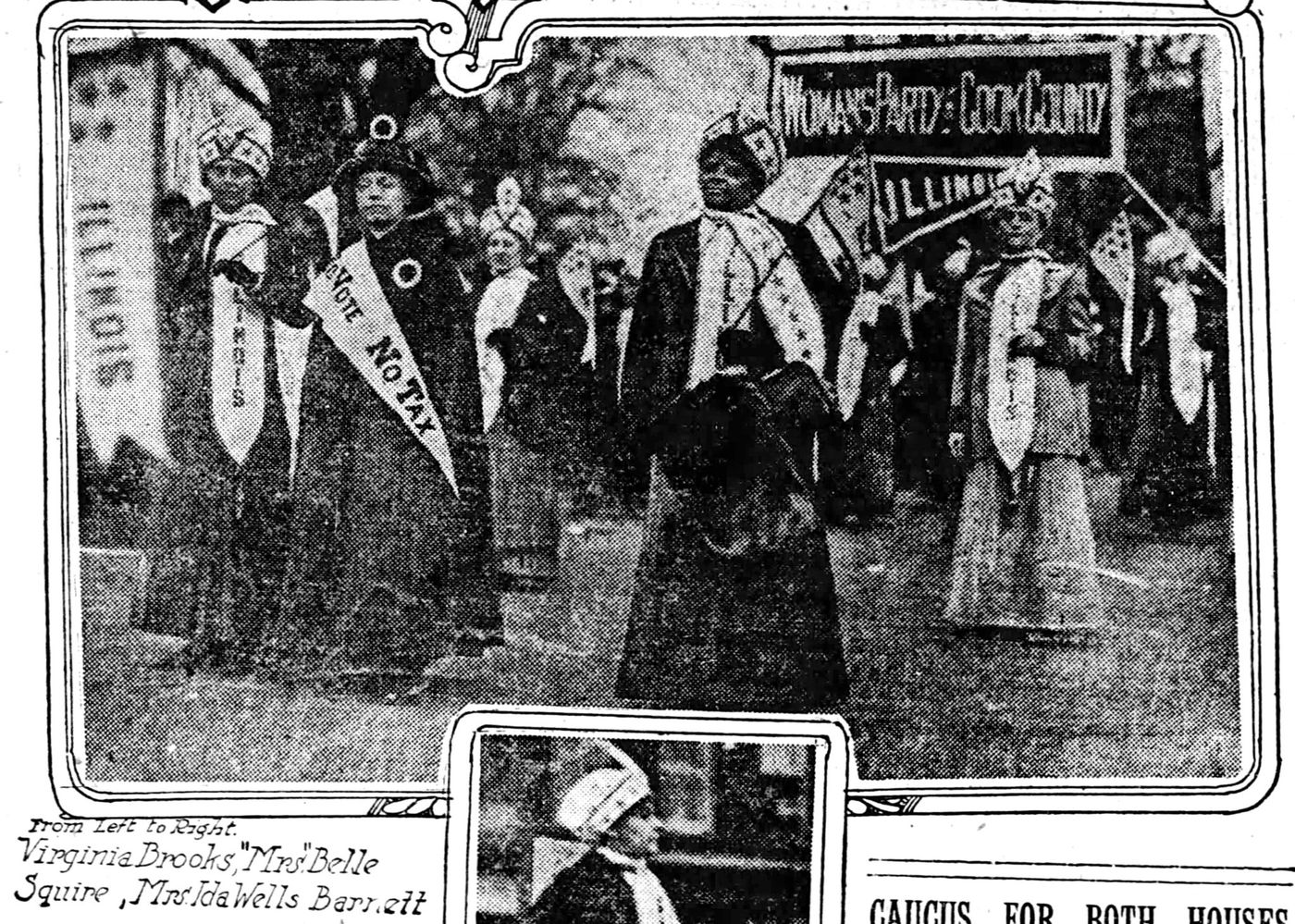
Ida B. Wells at the Woman Suffrage Procession

African-American voices in the women's suffrage movement were present at the beginning in Illinois. White women were also more involved in promoting and supporting Black women in the suffrage movement. Naomi Talbert Anderson attended the first Illinois women's suffrage convention in 1869 and advocated for Black women in the suffrage movement. Prudence Crandall, a white teacher and suffragist who was forced out of Connecticut for teaching African-American students, was an early supporter of Black women's suffrage in Illinois. Anna Blount also spoke out against excluding Black women from women's clubs. Sophonisba Breckinridge worked to use women's suffrage as a way to create racial justice.

Sadie Lewis Adams served as a delegate to the IESL when they held their conventions in Chicago. In 1913, the Alpha Suffrage Club was founded by Ida B. Wells and Belle Squire in Chicago. the Alpha Suffrage Club worked on a broader range of issues than other women's suffrage clubs in Illinois. The club was the first group to hold a suffrage meeting in the Bridewell Prison. The club was a centralized place for Black women to learn about politics and ways to empower themselves. Women in the Alpha Suffrage Club created political power that was noticed by the Republican Party who asked them to support their candidate. Black suffragists earned the support of African-American men by arguing that they could use their vote to support Black politicians. In 1915, the Alpha Suffrage Club helped elect the first Black alderman in Chicago, Oscar DePriest.

When Wells refused to march in the segregated section of the Woman Suffrage Procession in 1913, her action was publicized. A picture of Wells marching between her white friends, Squire and Virginia Brooks, was published in the Chicago Daily Tribune. The publicity of Wells defiance against segregation was important for Black women in the country, showing them that they had a place in the women's suffrage movement.

== Anti-suffragists ==
In Illinois, one of the reasons people opposed women's suffrage was because it upset gender roles. There were fears that women's suffrage would hurt the traditional family. One man wrote the state Senate to oppose women's suffrage because he believed that suffragists secretly hated men. Others worried that ideas like socialism and anarchy would be supported by suffragists.

Caroline Fairfield Corbin of Chicago created the Illinois Association Opposed to the Extension of Suffrage to Women (IAOESW) in 1897. Corbin worked not only to oppose the efforts of Illinois suffragists, but also took her campaign to Germany. Corbin had a rivalry with Susan B. Anthony. Corbin's message was that women who already liked their position in life would lose their privilege and that suffragists would spread socialism and communism in the United States.

== See also ==
- List of Illinois suffragists
- Timeline of women's suffrage in Illinois
- Women's suffrage in states of the United States
- Women's suffrage in the United States
