= Timeline of women's suffrage in Illinois =

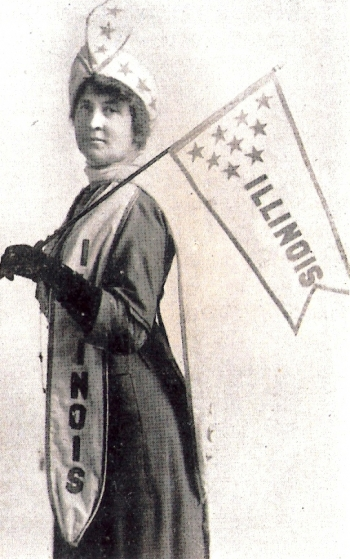
Grace Wilbur Trout, 1913

This is a timeline of women's suffrage in Illinois. Women's suffrage in Illinois began in the mid 1850s. The first women's suffrage group was created in 1855 in Earlville, Illinois by Susan Hoxie Richardson. The Illinois Woman Suffrage Association (IWSA), later renamed the Illinois Equal Suffrage Association (IESA), was created by Mary Livermore in 1869. This group held annual conventions and petitioned various governmental bodies in Illinois for women's suffrage. On June 19, 1891, women gained the right to vote for school offices. However, it wasn't until 1913 that women saw expanded suffrage. That year women in Illinois were granted the right to vote for Presidential electors and various local offices. Suffragists continued to fight for full suffrage in the state. Finally, Illinois became the first state to ratify the Nineteenth Amendment on June 10, 1919. The League of Women Voters (LWV) was announced in Chicago on February 14, 1920.

== 19th century ==
=== 1850s ===
1855

- Alonzo Jackson Grover gives the first women's suffrage speech in Illinois.
- Susan Hoxie Richardson creates the Earlville Suffrage Association.

=== 1860s ===
1869

- Mary Livermore organizes a women's suffrage convention in Chicago.
- During the convention, the Illinois Woman Suffrage Association (IWSA) is created.
- Livermore starts the women's suffrage newspaper, The Agitator.

=== 1870s ===
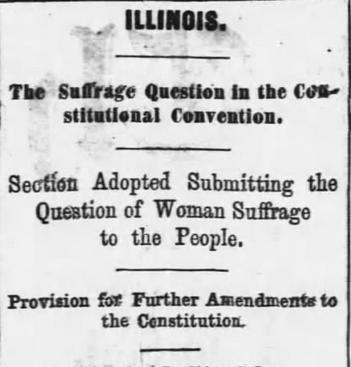
Suffrage question in state constitutional convention, April 17, 1870

1870

- February: Frances Willard and the IWSA petition the Illinois Constitutional Convention to include women's suffrage in the state constitution.
- February: Annual meeting of IWSA held at the Opera House in Springfield, Illinois.

1871

- Annual convention of IWSA held at Farewell Hall in Chicago.

1872

- Annual convention of IWSA held in the Opera House in Bloomington, Illinois.

1873

- School offices are opened to women in Illinois.

1874

- Ten women are elected to County Superintendent of Schools.

1876

- Elizabeth Boynton Harbert becomes president of IWSA.
- IWSA affiliates with the National Women's Suffrage Association (NWSA).

1879

- Frances Willard brings a petition to the General Assembly for women to have suffrage rights over alcohol-related issues in Illinois.

=== 1880s ===
1884

- The American Woman Suffrage Association (AWSA) holds their annual convention in Chicago.

1885

- Susan B. Anthony addresses the Cook County Woman's Suffrage Society.

1887

- Mary Holmes becomes president of IWSA.

1888

- The Decatur Women's Suffrage Club is formed by Sophie Gibb and 100 other women in Decatur, Illinois.
- The Naperville Equal Suffrage Club is created.

=== 1890s ===
1890

- IWSA changes their name to the Illinois Equal Suffrage Association (IESA).

1891

- April 6: Fifteen women led by Ellen Martin legally vote in Lombard, Illinois using a loophole in their city charter.
- June 19: Women gain the right to vote in school elections with a School Suffrage law.

1892

- The Illinois Supreme Court decides that the School Suffrage law is constitutional.

1893

- A bill for Township suffrage for women is introduced in the state Senate, but is not successful in the House.
- A bill to repeal the School Suffrage Law is defeated in the state House.
- March: Carrie Chapman Catt tours the southern part of Illinois.

1894

- The Chicago Political Equality League (CPEL) is created.

1895

- A bill for Township suffrage is again introduced in the Senate, but fails.
- April: IWSA holds their annual convention in Decatur.

1897

- Caroline Fairfield Corbin creates the Illinois Association Opposed to the Extension of Suffrage to Women.
- Bills for Township and Bond suffrage are introduced in the state legislature, but do not pass.

1898

- Women's suffrage groups lobbied for women to be exempt from taxation since they did not vote, but the legislature did not act on the idea.

1899

- Again, bills for Township and Bond suffrage are introduced in the legislature, but do not pass.

== 20th century ==
=== 1900s ===
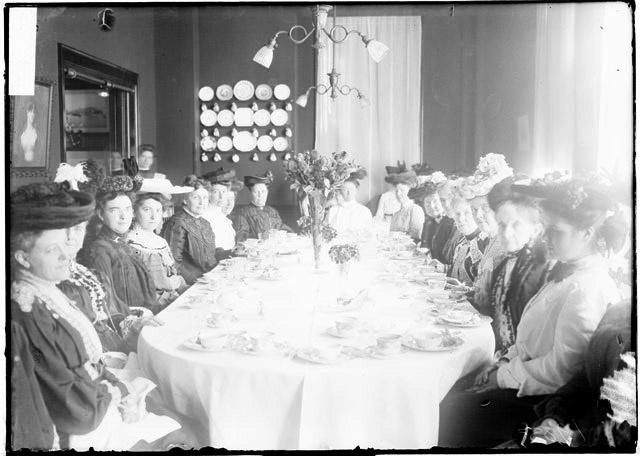
Suffrage club meeting in Chicago in 1905

1900

- October: The Illinois Equal Suffrage Association (IESA) holds their annual convention in Edgewater, Chicago.
- Elizabeth Boynton Harbert becomes president IESA.

1901

- Elizabeth F. Long becomes IESA president.

1902

- IESA holds their annual convention in Jacksonville, Illinois and Kate Hughes is elected president.

1903

- Hughes is elected president of IESA for a second term.

1904

- Catharine Waugh McCulloch is elected president of IESA.

1905

- IESA holds their annual convention in Chicago and Ella S. Stewart is elected the president.

1906

- Stewart is re-elected as IESA president.

1907

- The IESA convention is held at the Illinois State Fair in Springfield.

1908

- June: IESA works with NAWSA to lobby delegates to the Republican National Convention in Chicago.

1909

- A municipal suffrage bill goes to the Chicago City Council, but does not pass.
- November 19: Emmeline Pankhurst and Ethel Snowden speak in Chicago at the IESA annual convention.
- The Chicago Men's Equal Suffrage League is formed.

=== 1910s ===
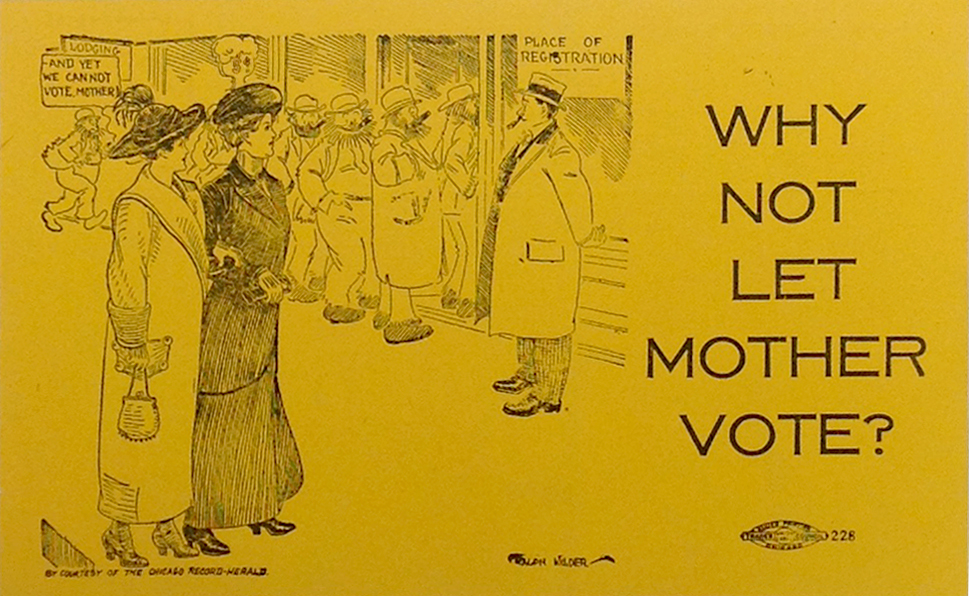
"Why Not Let Mother Vote" postcard, 1910

1910

- Grace Wilbur Trout becomes president of the Chicago Political Equality League (CPEL).
- July: Suffragists begin automobile tours around Illinois, speaking on women's suffrage.
- October: IESA holds their state convention in Elgin, Illinois.
- Mrs. Willis S. McCrea creates the North Side Branch of IESA.

1911

- CPEL moves their headquarters to the Fine Arts Building.
- October 31-November 1: IESA holds their annual convention in Decatur. Elvira Downey becomes the president.

1912

- October: Trout becomes president of IESA.
- October 2: The IESA state convention is held in Galesburg, Illinois.
- December 12: Suffrage mass meeting takes place at the same time as the National American Woman Suffrage Association (NAWSA) convention in Chicago.

1913

- January: Alpha Suffrage Club is formed.
- March: Ida B. Wells, Grace Wilbur Trout and other Illinois suffragists march in the Woman Suffrage Procession in Washington, D.C. Wells refuses to be segregated in this parade.
- May 7: The presidential and municipal suffrage bill for women passes the State Senate.
- June 11: The presidential and municipal suffrage bill passes the state House.
- June 13: Suffragists hold a "Victory Banquet" at the Leland Hotel in Springfield.
- June 26: Women's suffrage bill for Presidential and local elections signed by governor into law.
- July 1: Jubilee car parade takes place on Michigan Boulevard.

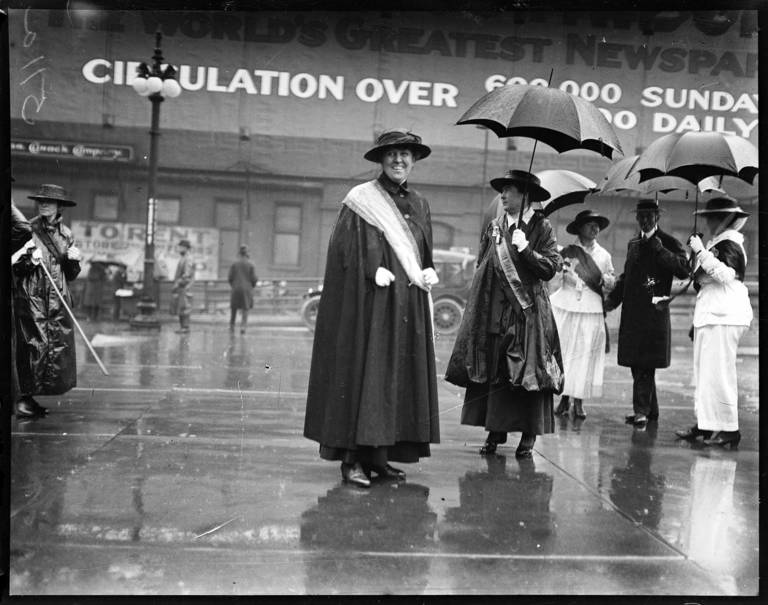
Rainy suffrage parade with Janet Ayer Fairbank in Chicago, June 7, 1916

1914

- May 2: Suffrage parade takes place in Chicago with 15,000 marchers along Michigan Ave.
- June: The General Federation of Women's Clubs (GFWC) holds their biennial convention in Chicago where they formally support women's suffrage.
- June 13: The Illinois Supreme Court upholds women's right to vote in School officer elections in Plummer v. Yost.
- August 15: Self-Denial Day to raise money for suffrage efforts.

1915

- IESA holds their annual convention in Peoria, Illinois.

1916

- June: During the Republican National Convention, 5,000 women marched for women's suffrage.
- June: The National Woman's Party (NWP) is formed in Chicago.

1917

- The IESA convention is held in Danville, Illinois.

1919

- June 10: Illinois is the first state to vote to ratify the Nineteenth Amendment.
- June 24: Suffragists hold a celebration of the ratification at the La Salle Hotel.

=== 1920s ===
1920

- January: The Illinois Constitutional Convention discusses adding women's suffrage to the state constitution.
- February 14: The League of Women Voters (LWV) is formed at the Pick Congress Hotel in Chicago.

== See also ==
- List of Illinois suffragists
- Women's suffrage in Illinois
- Women's suffrage in states of the United States
- Women's suffrage in the United States
