= List of first women lawyers and judges in Illinois =

This is a list of the first women lawyer(s) and judge(s) in Illinois. It includes the year in which the women were admitted to practice law (in parentheses). Also included are women who achieved other distinctions such becoming the first in their state to graduate from law school or become a political figure.

== Firsts in state history ==
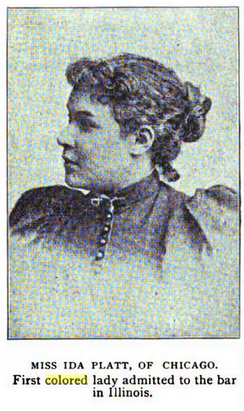
Ida Platt: First African-American female lawyer in Illinois (1894)

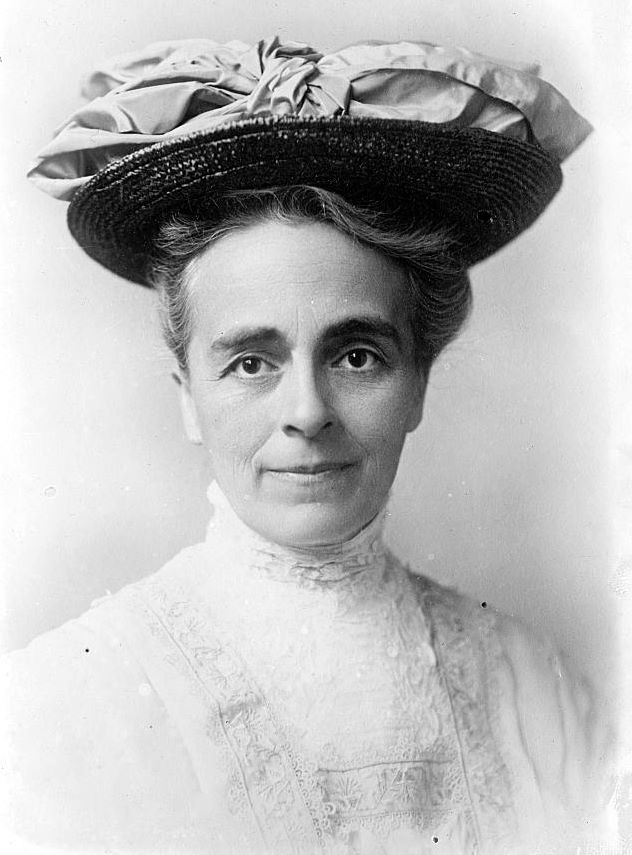
Catherine Waugh McCulloch: First female Justice of the Peace in Illinois (1907)

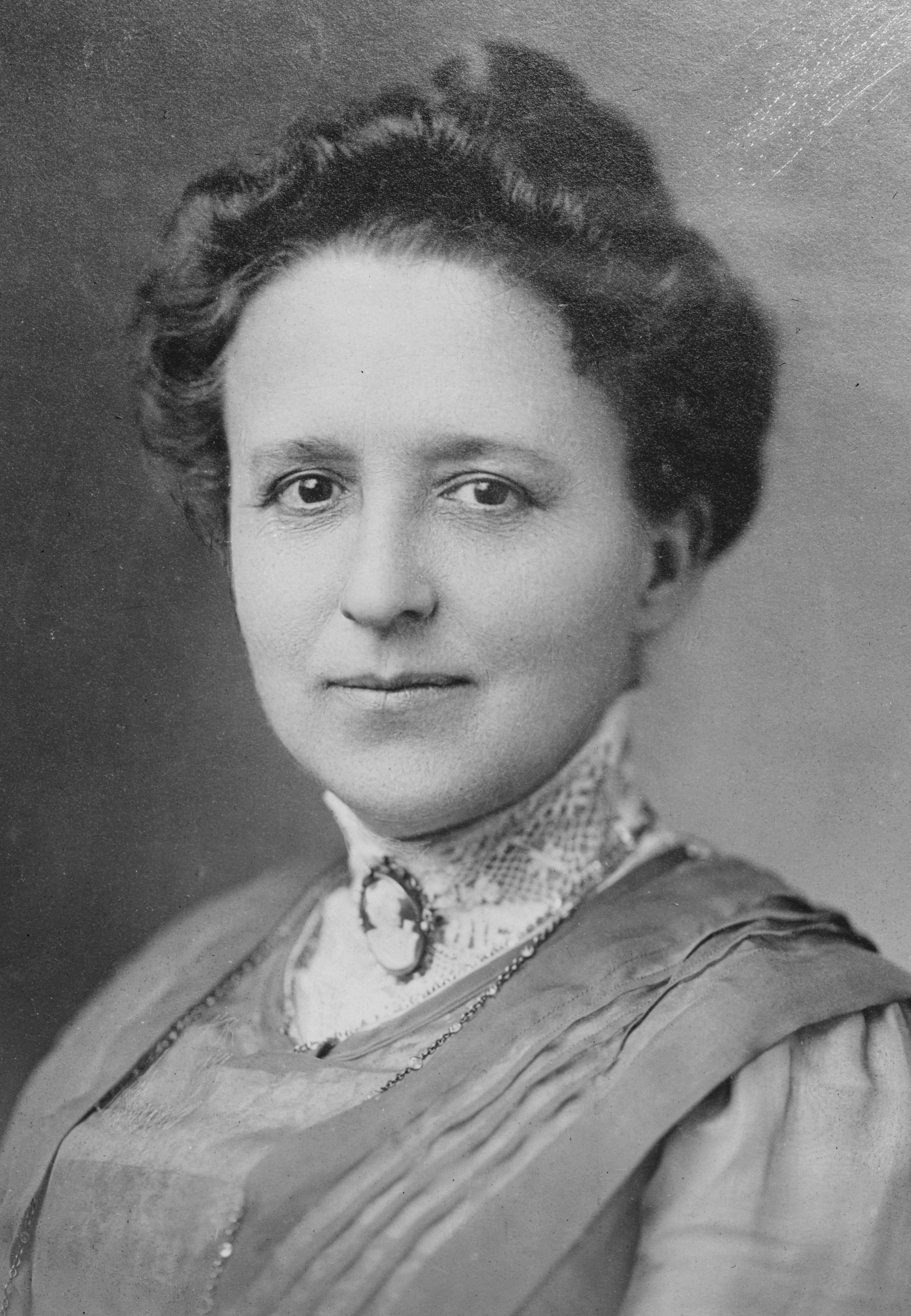
Mary Bartelme: First female judge in Illinois (1923)

=== Law School ===
- Ada Kepley (1881): First female law graduate in Illinois (1870)

=== Lawyers ===
- Myra Bradwell (1890 (1869*)): She aimed to be the first woman admitted to the Illinois State Bar. Denied admission in 1870 because she was a woman, she was admitted nunc pro tunc in 1890, backdated to her 1869 application, in honor of her efforts.
- Alta M. Hulett (1873): First female lawyer in Illinois admitted to the bar. (After the Bradwell case, the state legislature changed the law to allow women to become lawyers)
- Ellen A. Martin (1875): First female (a lawyer) to successfully vote in Illinois after finding a loophole in the Lombard town charter in 1891, which was upheld in court.
- Mary A. Ahrens (1889): Sole female in the inaugural group of 33 lawyers sworn to the bar of the Seventh Circuit Court of Appeals in 1891.
- Ida Platt (1894): First African-American female lawyer in Illinois
- Helen M. Cirese (1921): First Italian American female admitted to the Illinois State Bar
- Elizabeth K. Ohi (1937): First Japanese American female lawyer in Illinois
- Renee C. Hanover (1969): First openly lesbian lawyer in Illinois
- Lola Miranda Hale (1969), Virginia Martinez (1975) and Viola Armijo Rouse (1975): First Latino American female lawyers in Illinois

=== State judges ===
- Catherine Waugh McCulloch (1886): First female elected as the Justice of the Peace in Illinois (1907)
- Mary Bartelme: First elected female judge (1923) and appointed assistant judge (1913) in Illinois
- Edith S. Sampson (1927): First African American female judge in Illinois (1962)
- Jane D. Waller (1973): First female to serve on the Nineteenth Circuit in Illinois (1981)
- Rita B. Garman (1968): First female to serve as the Presiding Judge for the Fifth Circuit (1987) and the Fourth District Appellate Court (1995) in Illinois
- Consuelo Bedoya-Witt (1977): First Hispanic American female judge in Illinois (1988)
- Rosemary Collins: First female to serve on the Seventeenth Judicial Circuit Court in Illinois (1989)
- Lynne Kawamoto (1981): First Asian American female (who is Japanese American) judge in Illinois (1991)
- Mary Ann McMorrow (1953): First female to serve on the Supreme Court of Illinois (1992) and its Chief Justice (2002)
- Nancy J. Katz: First openly LGBT female judge in Illinois (upon her appointment to the Cook County Circuit Court in 1999)
- Rena M. Van Tine (1986): First Indian American female judge in Illinois (2001)
- Pamela Leeming: First known Pakistani American (female) judge in Illinois (2009)
- Laura Liu (1991): First Asian American female judge in Illinois (2010) and serve on the Illinois Appellate Court (2014)
- Jessica Arong O’Brien: First Filipino American (female) elected as a judge in Illinois (2012)
- Vershenia Ballance Moody (1995): First (African American) female to serve on the 6B Judicial District in Illinois (2013)
- Lisa Holder White (1993): First African American female to serve on the Fourth District Appellate Court (2013) and the Supreme Court of Illinois (2022)
- Brenda Claudio: First Latino American female to serve as a Judge of the Twenty-First Judicial Circuit in Illinois (2021)
- Tionn Fambro Carter: First African American female to serve as an Associate Judge of the Fourteenth Judicial Circuit in Illinois (2024)

=== Federal judges ===
- Ann Claire Williams (1975): First African American female to serve on the United States District Court for the Northern District of Illinois (1985) and U.S. Court of Appeals for the Seventh Circuit (1999)
- Nancy J. Rosenstengel: First female to serve on the United States District Court for the Southern District of Illinois (2013)
- Staci Michelle Yandle (1987): First openly LGBT and African American female to serve on the United States District Court for the Southern District of Illinois (2014)
- Martha M. Pacold: First Asian American female to serve on the United States District Court for the Northern District of Illinois (2019)
- Rebecca R. Pallmeyer (1979): First female to serve as the Chief United States district judge of the United States District Court for the Northern District of Illinois (2019)
- Nancy L. Maldonado: First Hispanic American female to serve as a federal district court judge in Illinois (upon her appointment to the United States District Court for the Northern District of Illinois in 2022)

=== Attorney General ===
- Lisa Madigan: First female Attorney General of Illinois (2003)

=== Deputy Attorney General ===
- Jill Wine-Banks: First female to serve as the Deputy Attorney General for Illinois

=== Assistant Attorneys General ===
- Ada Cartwright: First female to serve as the Assistant Attorney General of Illinois (1917)
- Jean Williams (1949): First African American female to serve as the Assistant Attorney General of Illinois

=== Solicitor General ===
- Jill Wine-Banks: First female to serve as the Solicitor General for Illinois

=== United States Attorney ===
- Miriam Miquelon: First female to serve as the U.S. Attorney for the Southern District of Illinois (c. 2003)

=== Public Defender ===
- Pearl M. Hart (1914): First female (and LGBT) to serve as a public defender for the Moral Court of Chicago, Illinois (1933)

=== Bar Association ===
- Carole Bellows: First female to serve as the President of the Illinois State Bar Association (1977)
- Sonni Choi Williams: First female of color (she is of Korean descent) to serve as Vice President (2022) and President (2024) of the Illinois State Bar Association

== Firsts in local history ==
- Dorothy Wilbourn Spomer: First female elected judge in Southern Illinois (1950)
- Rita Garman (1968): First female to serve as a circuit judge and as presiding judge for the Fifth Circuit [Clark, Coles, Cumberland, Edgar and Vermillion Counties, Illinois]
- Katherine S. Gorman: First female to serve as the Chief Judge of the 10th Judicial Circuit in Illinois (2021) [includes Tazewell, Marshall, Putnam and Stark Counties, Illinois]
- Debra Wellborn (1986): First female associate circuit judge appointed in Adams County, Illinois
- Charlotte Safranske Martin (1976): First woman to be elected State's Attorney of Bureau County, Illinois. She won the vote 9,883 to 8,171. She was also the first Democrat to be elected to that post in 44 years.
- Ellen M. Yockey (1915): First female lawyer in Taylorville, Illinois [Christian County, Illinois]
- Teresa Righter (1982): First female judge in Coles County, Illinois (1997)
- Catherine Waugh McCulloch (1886): First female Justice of the Peace in Cook County, Illinois (1907-1911)
- Nellie Carlin (1896): First female to serve as the Public Guardian (1911) and Assistant State's Attorney in Cook County, Illinois (1918)
- Emma Baumann: First female to graduate from the Chicago College of Law (1890) [Cook and DuPage Counties, Illinois]
- Mary Bartelme: First female judge in Chicago, Illinois (1923) [Cook and DuPage Counties, Illinois]
- Sherry Pethers: First openly LGBT female elected as a judge in the Chicago area (2004) [Cook and DuPage Counties, Illinois]
- Lori Lightfoot (1989): First African American and openly LGBT female (a former prosecutor) to serve as Mayor of Chicago (2019) [Cook and DuPage Counties, Illinois]
- Esther Rothstein: First female to serve as President of the Chicago Bar Association (1977) [Cook and DuPage Counties, Illinois]
- Celia Meza: First Latino American female to serve as the Corporation Counsel for the City of Chicago (2021) [Cook and DuPage Counties, Illinois]
- Lynne Kawamoto (1981): First Asian American female (who is Japanese American) to serve as an Associate Judge for Cook County, Illinois (1991)
- Sophia Hall (1967): First female to serve as a Presiding Judge in Cook County, Illinois (1991)
- Pamela Leeming: First Pakistani American female to serve as an Associate Judge of the Circuit Court of Cook County (2009)
- Jessica Arong O’Brien: First Filipino American (female) judge in Cook County, Illinois (2012)
- Anita Alvarez: First Hispanic American female elected as the State's Attorney for Cook County, Illinois (2008)
- Kim Foxx: First African American female elected as the State’s Attorney for Cook County, Illinois (2016)
- Erica Reddick: First female to serve as the Presiding Judge of the Cook County Circuit Court’s criminal division (2021)
- Patricia Mell: First (African American) female to serve as the Dean of the University of Illinois Chicago School of Law (2003)
- Jeannice Appenteng: First African American (female) magistrate in Chicago, Illinois (2023) [Cook and DuPage Counties, Illinois]
- Joy V. Cunningham: First African American female to serve as President of the Chicago Bar Association (2005) [Cook and DuPage Counties, Illinois]
- Anita Alvarez: First Hispanic American female to serve as the President of the Chicago Bar Association (2010) [Cook and DuPage Counties, Illinois]
- Aurora Austriaco (1990): First Filipino American female to serve as the President of the Chicago Bar Association (2012-2013) [Cook and DuPage Counties, Illinois]
- Eva Rose Pollack Glaser (c. 1930s): First female lawyer in DuPage County, Illinois
- Helen Kinney (1952): First female Assistant State's Attorney (1962-1969) and circuit judge (1976) in DuPage County, Illinois
- Chantelle A. Porter: First African American female to serve as a Judge of the Eighteenth Judicial Circuit for DuPage County (2022)
- Monique O’Toole: First Arab American (female) judge in DuPage County, Illinois
- Christina Kye: First Korean American (female) judge in DuPage County, Illinois (2025)
- Vera Binks: First female lawyer and judge in Henry County, Illinois
- Marie Hunter Willis: First female lawyer in Kane County, Illinois
- Pamela Jansen: First female judge in Kane County, Illinois (1987)
- Sandra T. Parga: First Hispanic female judge in Kane County, Illinois (2017)
- J. Imani Drew (c. 1980s): First African-American female judge in Kankakee County, Illinois (2016). She was also the first African-American prosecutor (1983) in the county's history.
- Brenda Claudio: First Hispanic American (female) judge to preside in Kankakee County, Illinois (upon her appointment to the 21st Judicial Circuit in 2021)
- Victoria Chuffo: First female Public Defender for Kendall County, Illinois (c. 2007)
- Jane D. Waller (1973): First female judge in Lake County, Illinois
- Barbara Gilleran-Johnson: First female to serve on the Lake County Juvenile Court [Lake County, Illinois]
- Marilyn Barton (1970): First woman to practice law in LaSalle County, Illinois
- Karen Donnelly: First female chief prosecutor in LaSalle County, Illinois (2016)
- Anna Jensen Moore: First female lawyer in Lee County, Illinois
- Fannie Adele Bivans: First female lawyer in Decatur, Illinois [Macon County, Illinois]
- Lola Maddox: First female judge in Madison County, Illinois
- Mary N. Copeland: First female appointed as the Madison County Chief Public Defender (2020)
- Elizabeth Robb: First female judge in McLean County, Illinois
- Carla Barnes: First African American (female) judge in the 11th Judicial Circuit Court (McLean County; 2021). She was also the first African American (female) Public Defender in McLean County, Illinois.
- M. Carol Pope: First female to serve as the State's Attorney for Menard County, Illinois, as well as the first judge from the 8th Judicial Circuit and the county to be assigned to the Fourth District Appellate Court
- Jennifer Foutch: First female Public Defender for Perry County, Illinois (2011)
- Norma Guzman Kauzlarich: First Latino American female judge in Rock Island County, Illinois
- Alexis Otis-Lewis: First African American female judge in St. Clair County, Illinois (1991)
- Laura Beasley: First female to serve as the President of the East St. Louis Bar Association
- Erma Templeman: First woman to practice law in Sangamon County, Illinois
- Suzanne Patton (1999): First female judge in Stark County, Illinois (2016)
- Rita Garman (1968): First female assistant state’s attorney and first female associate judge in Vermillion County, Illinois
- Susan Pierson De Witt: First female to practice law in Will County, Illinois
- Kathleen Glenney Kallan: First female judge in Will County, Illinois
- Carmen Julia Lynn Goodman: First African American female to serve as a Judge of the Circuit Court in Will County, Illinois (2007)
- Sonni Choi Williams: First Asian American (female) judge in Will County, Illinois
- Carolyn B. Smoot: First female to serve on the First Judicial Circuit in Williamson County, Illinois
- Marcy Cascio-Hale: First female to serve as the State’s Attorney of Williamson County, Illinois (2022)
- Frances Marion Ridgely: First female lawyer to plead a case in Woodford, Illinois [Woodford County, Illinois]

== See also ==
- List of first women lawyers and judges in the United States
- Timeline of women lawyers in the United States
- Women in law

== Other topics of interest ==
- List of first minority male lawyers and judges in the United States
- List of first minority male lawyers and judges in Illinois
