= Elizabeth K. Ohi =

American lawyer

Kuma Elizabeth Ohi (later K. Elizabeth Owen 1911-1976) was the first Japanese American female lawyer in the United States and Illinois.

She was born on February 9, 1911, to a Eurasian household in Chicago, Illinois. Her father, Sidney T. Ohi, worked as a designer for the Pullman Company. Ohi attended the University of Chicago and earned her Bachelor of Laws and Juris Doctor from the John Marshall Law School. In 1937, Ohi became the first Japanese-American female admitted to practice law in the United States.

Despite her mixed racial ancestry, Ohi was detained following the bombing of Pearl Harbor. She was released due to the assistance of the attorney for whom she was working for as a clerk, Arthur Goldberg, who would go onto to become an associate justice of the Supreme Court of the United States. After a stint as an ensign in the United States Navy, Ohi relocated to Washington D.C, and became an attorney at the Office of Management and Budget and the U.S. Department of Labor. It was also in Washington D.C. that Ohi changed her last name to "Owen" in an effort to conceal her Japanese background and to pass as a non-Asian.

She died on August 14, 1976, in Washington D.C.

== See also ==
- List of first women lawyers and judges in the United States
- List of first women lawyers and judges in Illinois
