= Anna Willard Timmeus =

Anna WIllard Timmeus, from a 1913 publication

Anna Willard P. Timmeus was an American trade unionist and suffragist from Chicago.

In 1909, Timmeus was the president of the Waitress' Union in Chicago. In that same year, she and Elizabeth Maloney supported state legislation to cap the work day at eight hours. She also served as a delegate for the Chicago Waitress' Union at various labor conventions.

She was also involved in women's suffrage activism. Later, when women were able to vote in Illinois, she was one of many women denied the vote because their husbands were not United States residents.
