= Martha M. Pacold =

American judge (born 1979)

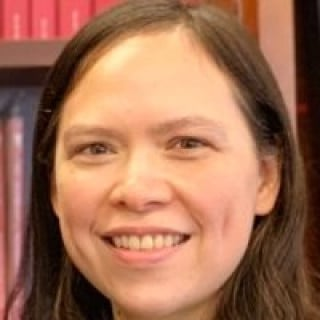

Judge of the United States District Court for the Northern District of Illinois
- Incumbent
- Assumed office August 16, 2019
- Appointed by: Donald Trump
- Preceded by: John W. Darrah

Personal details
- Born: February 3, 1979 (age 47) Richmond, Virginia, U.S.
- Education: Indiana University (BA); University of Chicago (JD)

Martha Maria Pacold (born February 3, 1979) is a United States district judge of the United States District Court for the Northern District of Illinois.

== Education ==
Pacold was educated at St. Ignatius College Prep in Chicago. She earned her Bachelor of Arts with highest distinction from Indiana University, where she was inducted into Phi Beta Kappa, and her Juris Doctor with honors from the University of Chicago Law School, where she was inducted into the Order of the Coif and served as Editor-in-Chief of the University of Chicago Law Review.

== Career ==
After graduating from law school, Pacold served as a law clerk for Judge A. Raymond Randolph of the United States Court of Appeals for the District of Columbia Circuit from 2002 to 2003 and for Judge Jay Bybee of the United States Court of Appeals for the Ninth Circuit from 2003 to 2004. She later clerked for Associate Justice Clarence Thomas of the Supreme Court of the United States from 2004 to 2005.

During her career, she served as a Counsel to the Attorney General at the United States Department of Justice from 2005 to 2006 and a Special Assistant United States Attorney for the Eastern District of Virginia from 2006 to 2007. She was previously an associate and then a partner in the Chicago office of Bartlit Beck Herman Palenchar & Scott, LLP. Pacold was also a Lecturer in Law at the University of Chicago Law School. She previously served as a Deputy General Counsel of the United States Department of the Treasury.

=== Federal judicial service ===
On June 7, 2018, President Donald Trump announced his intent to nominate Pacold to serve as a United States district judge of the United States District Court for the Northern District of Illinois. On June 11, 2018, her nomination was sent to the Senate. President Trump nominated Pacold to the seat vacated by John W. Darrah, who assumed senior status on March 1, 2017. On August 22, 2018, a hearing on her nomination was held before the Senate Judiciary Committee. On October 11, 2018, her nomination was reported out of committee by an 18–3 vote.

On January 3, 2019, her nomination was returned to the President under Rule XXXI, Paragraph 6 of the United States Senate. On April 8, 2019, President Trump renominated Pacold to the same position. On May 21, 2019, her nomination was sent to the Senate. On June 20, 2019, her nomination was reported out of committee by an 18–4 vote. On July 30, 2019, the Senate invoked cloture on her nomination by an 86–2 vote. On July 31, 2019, her nomination was confirmed by a 87–3 vote. She received her judicial commission on August 16, 2019. She was sworn in on August 23, 2019.

On September 9, 2020, President Trump included her on a list of potential nominees to the Supreme Court.

== Memberships ==
Pacold was a member of the Federalist Society from approximately 2000–2008.

== See also ==
- List of Asian American jurists
- List of first women lawyers and judges in Illinois
- List of law clerks for the tenth seat of the Supreme Court of the United States
- Donald Trump Supreme Court candidates

Legal offices
Preceded by John W. Darrah	Judge of the United States District Court for the Northern District of Illinois; 2019–present	Incumbent
