= John W. Darrah =

American judge (1938–2017)

Senior Judge of the United States District Court for the Northern District of Illinois
- In office March 1, 2017 – March 23, 2017

Judge of the United States District Court for the Northern District of Illinois
- In office July 14, 2000 – March 1, 2017
- Appointed by: Bill Clinton
- Preceded by: George M. Marovich
- Succeeded by: Martha M. Pacold

Personal details
- Born: December 11, 1938 Chicago, Illinois
- Died: March 23, 2017 (aged 78) Lisle, Illinois
- Education: Loyola University Chicago (BS); Loyola University Chicago School of Law (JD)

John Walter Darrah (December 11, 1938 – March 23, 2017) was a United States district judge of the United States District Court for the Northern District of Illinois.

== Education and career ==
Darrah was born in Chicago, Illinois. He earned a Bachelor of Science from Loyola University Chicago in 1965 and a Juris Doctor from Loyola University Chicago School of Law in 1969. From 1969 to 1971, he worked as an attorney advisor for the Federal Trade Commission.

He served as a deputy public defender in DuPage County from 1971 to 1973, while also working in private practice. In 1972, he began teaching as an adjunct professor at Northern Illinois University College of Law.

From 1973 to 1976, he was an assistant state’s attorney in Illinois. He returned to private practice from 1976 to 1986.

In 1986, he became a judge on the Illinois 18th Judicial Circuit Court, where he served until 2000. He played a key role in creating the Keith Roberts Trial Advocacy Program, a continuing legal education program sponsored by the DuPage County Bar Association since around 1995. One of its sessions was held just days before his death in 2017.

Among his most well-known cases, he presided over a civil case that led to George Lucas, creator of Star Wars, to abandon plans for to build a Chicago museum.

== Federal judicial service ==
On May 11, 2000, Darrah was nominated by President Bill Clinton to a seat on the United States District Court for the Northern District of Illinois vacated by George Michael Marovich. Darrah was confirmed by the United States Senate on June 30, 2000, and received his commission on July 14, 2000. He continued to teach as an adjunct professor at The John Marshall Law School, teaching evidence and trial advocacy. He assumed senior status on March 1, 2017, serving in that status until his death on March 23, 2017, at his residence in Lisle, Illinois.

== Sources ==
Legal offices
Preceded by George M. Marovich	Judge of the United States District Court for the Northern District of Illinois; 2000–2017	Succeeded by Martha M. Pacold
