= Anna Blount =

American physician (1872–1953)

Anna Ellsworth Blount
- Blount, from a 1908 publication
- Born: January 18, 1872; Oregon, Wisconsin, U.S.
- Died: February 12, 1953 (aged 81); Mukwonago, Wisconsin, U.S.
- Occupations: Doctor specializing in obstetrics and gynecology
- Known for: Doctor, Suffragist, Activist in public health
- Spouse: Ralph Earl Blount
- Children: Walter Putnam Blount, MD; Earl Ellsworth Blount; Ruth Amelia Blount (Bennett), MD

Anna Blount (January 18, 1872 – February 12, 1953) was an American physician from Chicago, and Oak Park. She was awarded Doctor of Medicine June 17, 1897 by Northwestern University. She volunteered her medical services at Hull House, a settlement house in Chicago that was founded in 1889. She encouraged other women to become physicians and was the president of the National Medical Women's Association.

== Sex education and birth control ==
Blount was a proponent of birth control and a leader in the birth control movement in the United States. She was a frequent contributor to the Birth Control Review. She served on the committee of the First American Birth Control Conference. Blount gave lectures on "sex hygiene" to Chicago high schools, clubs and to universities. She created pamphlets, such as A Talk With Mothers, which discussed condom use. She believed that "shielding women" from information about sexually transmitted disease was wrong. When it was still illegal to do so, Blount gave out information about birth control in direct violation of laws against discussing birth control in order to test those laws.

In the Chicago Citizens Committee for Birth Control was active Anna Blount, member of the CWC, who in the twenties emphasized the necessity of increasing the number of women among physicians. Nota bene, her guide on birth control was titled: A Talk to Mothers by a Doctor Who is a Mother Herself. She introduced herself here as professionally prepared for counseling in the area of birth control, as well as a woman who shared these experiences with other women. Her status was legitimized by the fact of her having three children and specializing in gynecology and pediatrics.”

Blount also supported the idea of eugenics. Blount called eugenics "the most important movement of modern times." She chaired the Eugenics Education Society of Chicago. Blount believed that people should choose to have children with only the most mentally and physically healthy individuals. She believed that "cruelty is a hereditary characteristic." She connected alcoholism with heredity as well. Blount even believed that lowering the population size would prevent war and world hunger.

Blount did not believe that people who were unhappy with one another should stay married, and proposed that obtaining a divorce should be made easier in the courts. She advocated that juries on divorce trials should be made up of women.

== Woman's suffrage ==
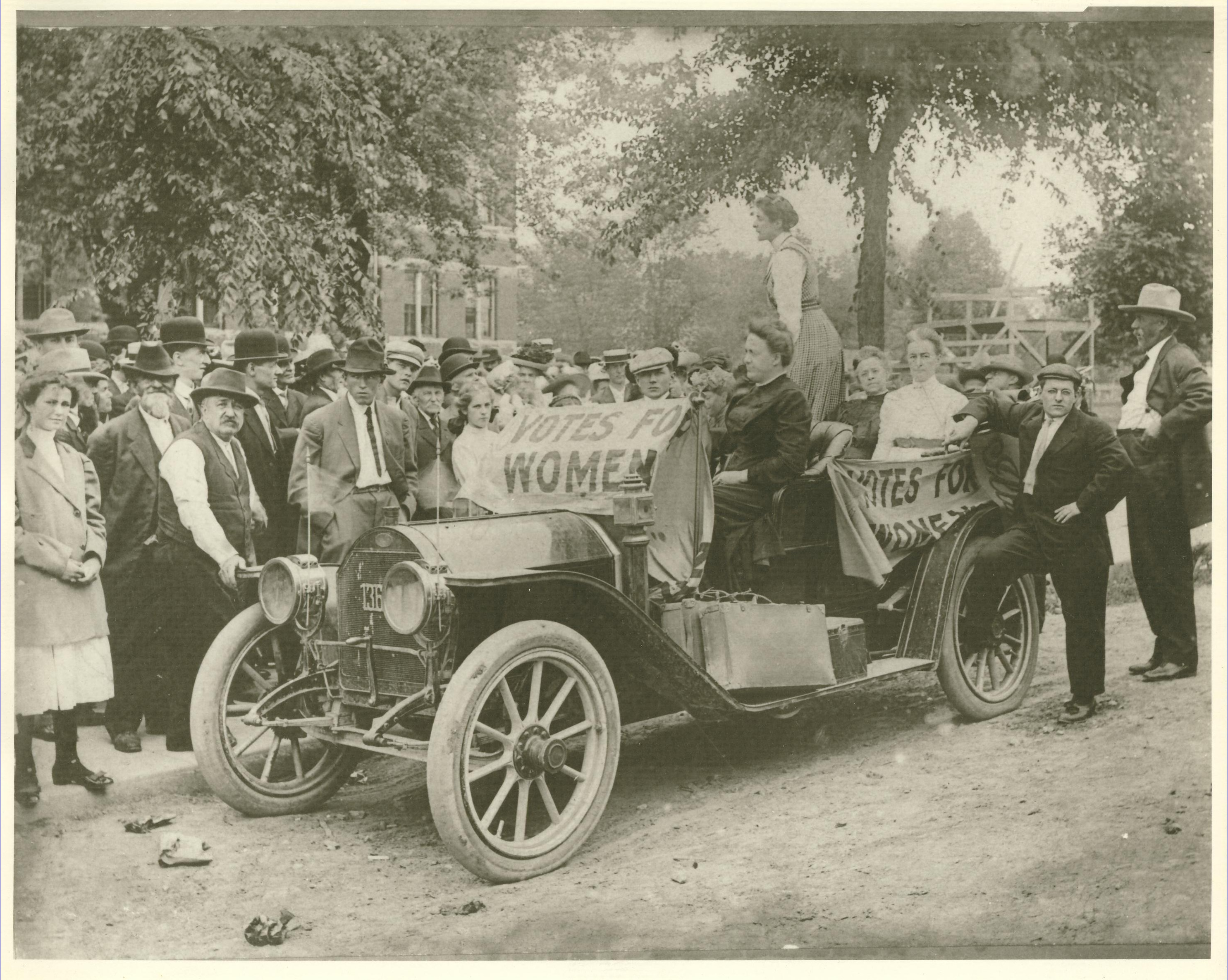
Blount in a suffrage rally in Illinois.

Blount was a leader in the women's suffrage movement. She was a member of the Chicago Woman's Club and the Nineteenth Century Woman's Club of Oak Park. Blount spoke out against club organizations attempting to prevent African American women from joining. Concerning Dr. Blount's involvement in the woman's suffrage movement, The Gentle Force says,

Dr. Anna Blount and Grace Wilbur Trout ... achieved state-wide reputations as leaders for the cause, and both served on the Municipal Suffrage Commission in Illinois, as did Club members Grace Hall Hemingway and Anna Lloyd Wright. Dr. Blount was an active physician and surgeon, with a specialty in obstetrics and gynecology. She campaigned vigorously for suffrage, and in 1906 she, along with Elizabeth Ball and Phoebe Butler, established the Suburban Civics and Equal Suffrage Association (later the League of Women Voters). According to the local paper, this Association was founded by 'some of the most prominent women in Illinois, who have made an imperishable record for their service in the cause of woman suffrage.'"

Note that Grace Hall Hemingway was the mother of author Ernest Hemingway and Anna Lloyd Wright was the mother of architect Frank Lloyd Wright.

In The Young Hemingway Michael Reynolds says, "In 1907, to the amusement of male Oak Parkers, the Illinois Equal Suffrage convention was held at Scoville Institute, where Dr. Anna Blount, a local woman, was the wittiest and most persuasive voice."

Concerning Blount's high reputation, at pages 106-107 Reynolds states,

In those days in Oak Park, wives were known in the newspaper by their husbands' names: Mrs. John Farson, Mrs. William Barton. In contrast, Hemingway's mother always appeared as Mrs. Grace Hall Hemingway. Only two other women appeared in such fashion: Dr. Anna Blount, who led the suffragist movement in Oak Park and Illinois, and made contributions at the national level in the fight for the vote; and Belle Watson-Melville, a performer on the national Chautauqua circuit.

== Personal life ==
Anna Blount and her husband, Ralph Earl Blount, both worked at Hull House. They lived in Oak Park, IL, and had three children: Walter Putnam, Earl Ellsworth, and Ruth Amelia. Both Walter and Ruth became doctors, with Ruth, who received her Doctor of Medicine degree from Northwestern University on June 16, 1934, being one of the women "encouraged ... to become physicians" by her mother, as has been referred to above.

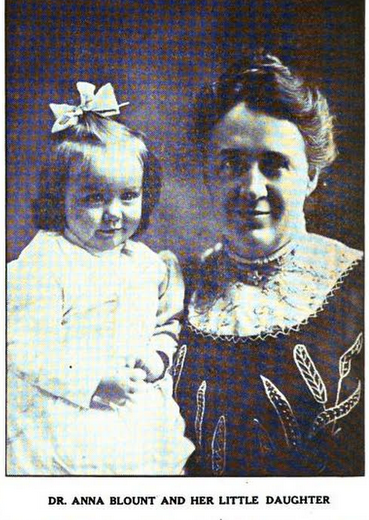
Anna Blount and her young daughter, from a 1911 publication.

Sylwia Kuźma-Markowska refers to Blount as "a physician, suffragist, and social activist. She graduated in medicine from the Women’s Medical School of Northwestern University and in gynecology and pediatrics from a university in Munich.” Blount had an active medical practice. For example, she delivered Iovanna, the daughter of Frank Lloyd Wright and his mistress, later wife, Olgivanna Lloyd Wright:

On December 2, 1925, at about six o'clock in the evening, Wright received the 'anxiously awaited call' from Dr. Anna Blount, the obstetrician. Wright evaded the photographers by entering the hospital through the rear. 'Dr. Anna Blount herself let me in,' Wright recalled, 'and proudly led me to the room where a little white bundle lay. A delicate pink face showing in the hollow of her mother's arm.' Holding his newborn daughter to the light, he declared, 'You're as big as a minute.'".

Blount's prominence in the Chicago area was illustrated by a 1934 photograph of her, her daughter-in-law, and recently born granddaughter appearing on the front page of the Chicago Herald and Examiner. The caption to the photo reads, "ALL SMILES ... Dr. Anna Blount ..., a veteran of the Women's and Children's Hospital, is shown holding her granddaughter, Elizabeth, 5 days old, as her daughter-in-law, Esther Stamm Blount, smiles happily." An article also on the front page is titled, "Hospital Run Efficiently By Women Alone," and states that the Women's and Children's Hospital had existed since Civil War days and had just celebrated its seventieth anniversary.
