= Grace Wilbur Trout =

American suffragist

Grace Belden Wilbur Trout
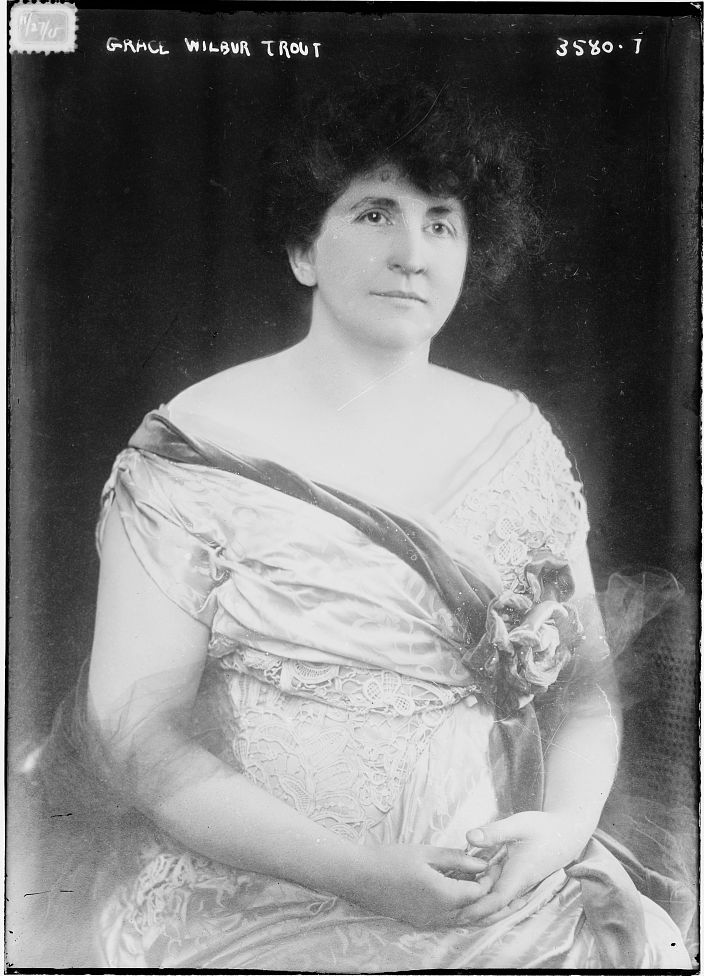
- Suffragist
- Born: March 18, 1864; Maquoketa, Iowa
- Died: October 21, 1955 (aged 91); Jacksonville, Florida
- Resting place: Evergreen Cemetery; Jacksonville, Florida
- Occupation: Women's rights activist
- Spouse: George William Trout
- Children: Thomas Wilbur Trout; Philip Wilbur Trout; Ralph Belden Trout; John Vernon Trout

Grace Belden Wilbur Trout (March 18, 1864 – October 21, 1955) was an American suffragist who was president of two prominent Illinois suffrage organizations, the Chicago Political Equality League and the Illinois Equal Suffrage Association (IESA). She was instrumental in getting the Illinois legislature to pass the presidential and municipal suffrage law, also known as the "Illinois Law," a law giving women partial suffrage by allowing them to vote in local and national elections. Though inexperienced with legislative work, she implemented a strategic lobbying plan in the state legislature that succeeded. She also organized public campaigns to build support for suffrage and secured favorable statewide media coverage.

== Early life, education, and accomplishments ==
Trout was born on March 18, 1864, in Maquoketa, Iowa. She was educated in public schools in Iowa and privately tutored in elocution. She married George William Trout in 1886 and they had four sons, one of whom died in 1912 at the age of 21. They moved to Chicago in 1884 and then to the nearby suburb of Oak Park. She wrote A Mormon Wife, a novel about women in the Mormon religion that was published in 1896.

== Suffrage activities ==
Concerning Mrs. Trout's involvement in the woman's suffrage movement, The Gentle Force says,

"Dr. Anna Blount and Grace Wilbur Trout ... achieved state-wide reputations as leaders for the cause, and both served on the Municipal Suffrage Commission in Illinois, as did Club members Grace Hall Hemingway and Anna Lloyd Wright. Grace Wilbur Trout was president of both the Chicago and the Illinois Equal Suffrage Associations. Described as attractive, tireless and gifted, she was a fearless speaker and creative fundraiser for the cause."

Note that Grace Hall Hemingway was the mother of author Ernest Hemingway and Anna Lloyd Wright was the mother of architect Frank Lloyd Wright.

=== Organizational leadership ===
Trout was active in numerous women's clubs in her community. Her suffrage activity began in earnest in 1910, when she became president of the Chicago Political Equality League, an organization founded in 1894 by the Chicago Women's Club. During Trout's two years as president, she guided the league in increasing its membership, meeting frequency, and committee structure. The league published pamphlets and circulated petitions to lobby the state legislature to grant women voting rights. Trout and other activists such as Catharine Waugh McCulloch made speaking tours of Illinois, arguing for suffrage through campaigns such as the Suffrage Automobile Tour.

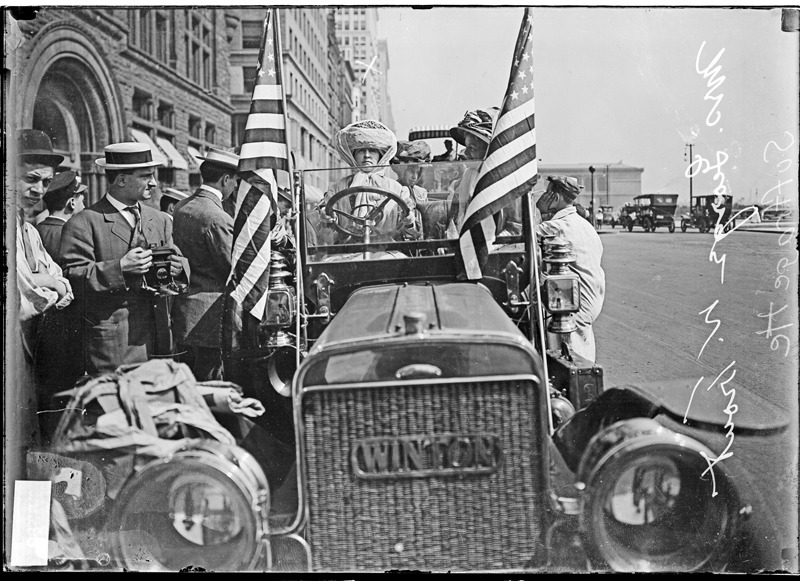
Grace Wilbur Trout drives suffragists through downtown Chicago

Two years later, at the annual convention of the Illinois Equal Suffrage Association (IESA, affiliated with the National Woman's Suffrage Association) on October 1–2, 1912, Trout was elected president of that association, a position she held almost every subsequent year through 1920 (except for 1915 when she took a rest and spent time in her second home in Jacksonville, Florida). As IESA president she changed the organization's tactics, setting new goals such as creating more local organizations and lobbying individual legislators to support suffrage. Launching the organization on a somewhat more conservative path, she was successful in achieving significant advances for women's suffrage.

=== Unexpected success ===
A suffrage bill had been introduced to the Illinois state legislature many times over the years, often by the long-time legislative chair of IESA, Catharine McCulloch. Considering the relative inexperience of the new president and her legislative chair Elizabeth Knox Booth, there was not much expectation of success. Nonetheless, the new leaders worked with supporters in the legislature to introduce a partial suffrage bill in 1913, permitting women to vote "for Presidential electors and for all local offices not specifically named in the Illinois Constitution," but not for state representatives, Congressional representatives, or governor. Trout mobilized a public show of support and conducted a strategically savvy lobbying operation, and the resulting bill was passed on June 11, 1913 (83 votes for, 58 votes against). On June 26, 1913, Illinois Governor Edward Dunne signed the Illinois Suffrage Act, which gave the women of Illinois limited suffrage.

==== Influencing the public ====
Trout put in place a modern, multi-pronged plan to build public support for woman suffrage. She made sure that a local suffrage club was formed in each district, so that organization members could then lobby representatives as needed. She strategically planned public events throughout the state, such as automobile and speaking tours, in order to generate and highlight local support. She regularly cultivated media connections in Springfield and Chicago to get favorable newspaper coverage of IESA activities, and she cooperated with newspaper publishers to produce special sections. She wrote that she regularly "made it a point to see one or more managers of the newspapers and explain to them the difficulties we were encountering, and asked them to publish an editorial that would be helpful to the situation...We had these various newspapers containing suffrage propaganda folded so that the editorial (blue penciled) came on the outside." She would then have the newspapers placed on the relevant legislators' desks, making the support appear spontaneous and widespread.

==== Influencing the legislature ====
Under Trout, IESA presence in Springfield changed in that it was much more subtle and quiet than previously. Initially, it was only Trout and legislative chair Elizabeth Booth; later two more joined them. Trout, Booth, Antoinette Leland Funk, and Ruth Hanna McCormick were called "the Big Four" by reporters. In previous campaigns, Catherine McCulloch's lobbying efforts had included trainloads of women arriving in Springfield, special hearings, and other very visible activities; McCulloch's style was "confrontational" and "militant". In contrast, Trout's team "kept the IESA’s legislative lobbying behind the scenes, so as not to arouse activity from opponents, especially the powerful liquor industry, and to leave open the possibility of converting anti-suffrage legislators.”

Trout was diplomatic, exercised "extreme tact," and could even be "ingratiating." Historian Adade Mitchell Wheeler wrote, "Her techniques may have been politically naive, but her human relations were superb. She and the others were experienced 'people movers.'" A legislator from Peoria characterized the tactics of the Big Four as "noiseless" in an article published in Collier's shortly after the bill was signed. He described Booth's systematic and analytical use of a homemade card catalogue. She pasted a picture of every member, cut from an Illinois Blue Book, and then noted things like their voting record, likely support, as well as whether they could be appealed to for fair play and how the member's wife felt about suffrage. Trout and Booth used this card system to study and categorize legislators, and build a nonpartisan coalition of support for their cause (there were Progressive, Democratic, Republican, and Socialist members of the legislature).

To influence Speaker of the House William B. McKinley, CPEL members in Chicago organized a telephone brigade that aimed to phone McKinley every fifteen minutes to ensure he saw how extensive suffrage support was. This resulted in McKinley bringing the bill up for a vote—something that hadn't occurred previously. On the day of the vote, Trout hired a cab for the whole day to transport missing members to the state capitol building if needed, and she herself guarded the door to make sure that supporters didn't leave at a key moment, and that opposing lobbyists didn't illegally get on the floor.

==== Additional factors contributing to success ====
In addition to legislative and public relations strategies outlined above, other factors also shaped the outcome.

First, suffrage had become increasingly acceptable among a wider group of citizens, particularly upper middle-class, educated, conservative women like Trout. Orchestrated events like the automobile tours helped increase support for suffrage, and helped make suffrage "more respectable." According to sociologist Steven M. Buechler, the movement transformed from an earlier mostly middle-class movement to a “cross-class, multiconstituency alliance” in which working women and wealthier women both had key roles.

Additionally, upper-class women held a significant number of leadership positions in the later period of the suffrage movement. In Trout's case, this resulted in a more reserved and conservative approach. Her partial suffrage bill was less demanding than the state constitutional changes sought by some of her fellow suffragists, like McCulloch. Plus, the English suffragette fight helped by presenting a contrast; as Antoinette Funk said, in England they were blowing up country homes while women in the United States weren't even making speeches. George Fitch believed the IESA lobby was able to keep the opposition in check "because of its lack of aggressiveness.”Trout and her associates were willing to negotiate and seek advice, even from opponents. Further, in contrast to McCulloch's goals of wider societal reform and full suffrage, Trout's goal was only to get the vote, which was much less threatening.

Finally, events in Washington, D.C., also helped increase support for suffrage. The negative aftermath of the Woman Suffrage Parade held on March 3, 1913, the day before President Woodrow Wilson's inauguration, actually helped improve public sentiment. Women were treated so poorly at this event, harassed and heckled by mostly male bystanders, that many people were moved to support suffrage in response to the injustice its proponents received. In Trout's own account of this march, she did not mention a well-known incident that occurred during the demonstration. When African-American Ida B. Wells wanted to march, Trout demanded that segregation be preserved to avoid offending Southern marchers who might boycott the event; therefore all the black suffragists would have to march in their own group, not with their respective state delegations. While Trout was personally opposed to such exclusion, she was more concerned with avoiding the potential boycott. Wells ignored the directions and marched alongside her Illinois cohort.

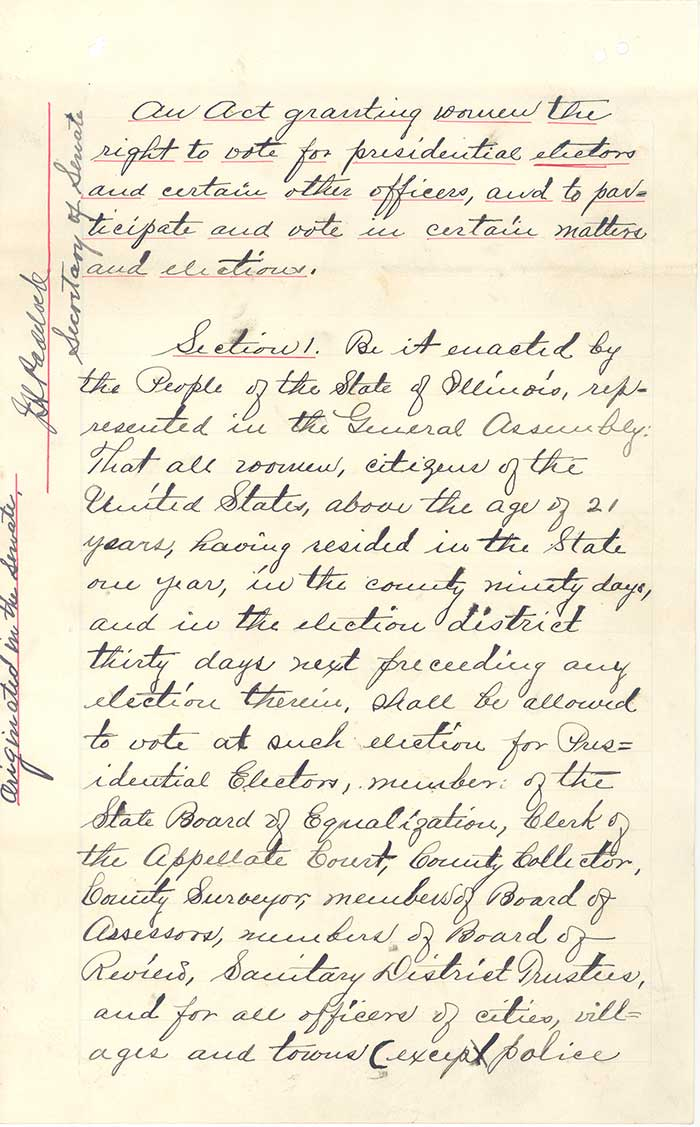
Image of the text of the Illinois Suffrage Act, found on Illinois Secretary of State website

== Significance of the Illinois Law ==
The passage of the Illinois Suffrage Act (also known as the Illinois Law) was a turning point for suffrage. It gave women in Illinois suffrage for township officials and presidential electors, increasing the presidential electors women could now vote for from 37 to 54. Although it was limited, not full suffrage, its effect was significant. It helped women in New York gain suffrage, and that success was a significant precursor toward full suffrage through the nineteenth amendment. National suffrage leader Carrie Chapman Catt wrote that "the effect of the Illinois victory was ‘astounding’ and that ‘suffrage sentiment doubled over night’ as a result.”

== Trout's suffrage work after 1913 ==
After the Illinois Law was passed, it was challenged repeatedly by opponents who claimed it was unconstitutional. As leader of IESA, Trout fought the opposition, and efforts to repeal or weaken the law failed, in part due to the IESA's work. Trout also encouraged women to vote and exercise their newly earned rights. She was one of the leaders of the 1916 "rainy day suffrage parade," where protesters successfully got the Republican Party to insert a suffrage plank in their platform. Trout also led the IESA effort toward creating a new state constitution, the route she thought would most expediently lead to full suffrage, and she helped in the national fight for the federal suffrage amendment, speaking at numerous Chautauquas and in a personal meeting with President Woodrow Wilson. In 1920, Trout ended her suffrage career when IESA disbanded and transformed to the League of Women Voters of Illinois.

== Personal life ==
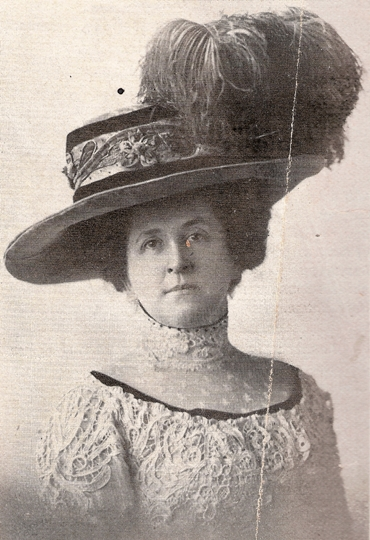
Grace Wilbur Trout

Trout wrote that she initially accepted the presidency of IESA because she was urged to do so by her 21-year-old son, who had seen California women fight for suffrage. He unexpectedly died shortly after she accepted her first IESA presidency.

Trout was sometimes criticized by more radical suffragists for press coverage of her designer clothes and huge hats. Yet she was widely admired as an orator and leader. As noted in 1927, "Mrs. Trout’s unusual gifts made her successful on the lecture platform, where she spoke without manuscript or notes. Her study of a theme was exhaustive, her preparation painstaking and the finished product sparkled with wit and humor."

Trout moved to Jacksonville, Florida, in 1921 and became the first president of the Planning and advisory board and president of the Jacksonville Garden Club. She resided at an estate called Marabanong. Trout died on October 21, 1955, in Jacksonville, and was buried in Evergreen Cemetery.

== Published works ==
- Grace Wilbur Trout (1912). A Mormon wife. Charles H. Kerr.
- Trout, Grace Wilbur (1920). "Side Lights on Illinois Suffrage History". Journal of the Illinois State Historical Society. 13 (2): 145–179. JSTOR 40194491.
- "Why Illinois Needs a New Constitution." Springfield, Ill. 1918.

== Bibliography ==
- Buechler, Steven M. (1986). The Transformation of the Woman Suffrage Movement: The Case of Illinois, 1850-1920. New Brunswick, NJ: Rutgers University Press.
- Fitch, George (August 9, 1913). "The Noiseless Suffragette". Collier's the National Weekly. 51: 5–6, 29–31.
- Poplett, Carolyn O.; Porucznik, Mary Ann (1992) [1988]. The Gentle Force: A History of the Nineteenth Century Woman's Club of Oak Park. A. & H. Lithoprint.
- Poplett, Carolyn O.; Porucznik, Mary Ann (2000). The Woman Who Never Fails: Grace Wilbur Trout and Illinois Suffrage. The Historical Society of Oak Park and River Forest. ISBN 0-9667926-1-0.
- Reeves, Winona Evans (1914). The Blue Book of Iowa Women. Missouri Printing and Publishing Co.
- Schultz, Rita Lunin; Hast, Adele (2001). Women Building Chicago 1790-1990. A Biographical Dictionary. Bloomington: Indiana University Press. ISBN 0253338522.
- Trout, Grace Wilbur (1920). "Side Lights on Illinois Suffrage History". Journal of the Illinois State Historical Society. 13 (2): 145–179. ISSN 0019-2287. JSTOR 40194491.
- Wheeler, Adade Mitchell (1983). "Conflict in the Illinois Woman Suffrage Movement of 1913". Journal of the Illinois State Historical Society. 76 (2): 95–114. ISSN 0019-2287. JSTOR 40191741.
