= Elizabeth A. Kingsbury =

19th-century American women's suffragist

- Occupations: Women's suffrage activist; lecturer; medium

Elizabeth A. Kingsbury was an American suffragist and lecturer active in the late 19th century. In 1885, she formed the first suffrage group in Southern California, the Woman Suffrage Association of Los Angeles. This organization played a significant role in advancing the women's suffrage movement in the region.

== Career ==
Kingsbury began her lecturing career in 1856. Besides that, she would travel the country to give lectures, speeches, and engage with the public about topics related to women's rights.

== Legacy ==
Kingsbury was known for her dedication to public engagement and education on women's rights. For five years following the establishment of the Woman Suffrage Association of Los Angeles, she invited the public to attend weekly meetings. These gatherings served multiple purposes, such as distribution of suffrage literature, musical performances, and speeches on women's rights.
