= The Lathrop sisters =

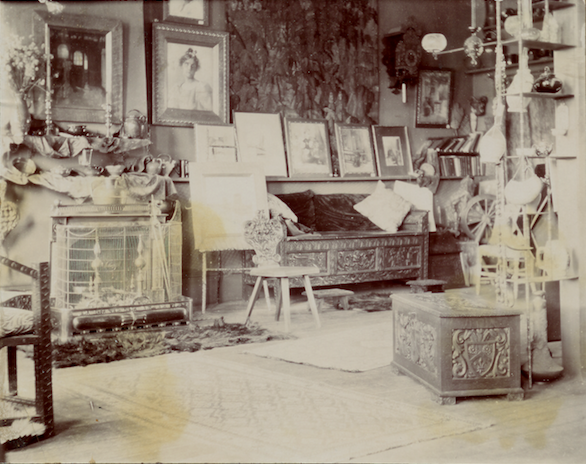
The Lathrop sisters displayed their paintings and woodcarvings in their Northampton, Mass., studio.

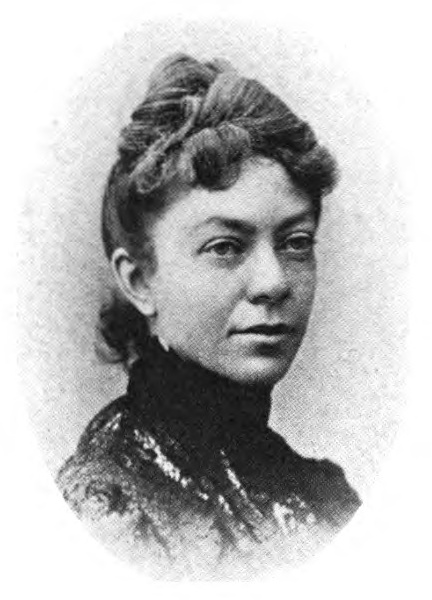
Clara Welles Lathrop

The sisters Clara Welles Lathrop (1853–1907), Bessie Stebbins Lathrop (1854–1930) and Susanne (Susie) Lathrop (1860–1938) were artists and teachers in Northampton, Massachusetts, who exhibited and traveled widely. Clara was a painter, Bessie was a leather worker and woodcarver, and Susie illustrated publications. In addition to exhibiting in the U.S. and Europe, they organized intellectual salons at their Northampton studio and taught art at schools including Smith College.

== Biographies ==
The sisters were daughters of Henry Lathrop (1811–1888), a dry-goods merchant, and Clara Stebbins Lathrop (1823–1908), a philanthropist who founded a home for aged and invalid women in Northampton. The girls’ grandfather Daniel Stebbins was a physician and entrepreneur who raised silkworms in Northampton mulberry groves (family homes were at 57 and 81 Bridge Street and 78 Pomeroy Terrace). The sisters spent early years in Savannah, where Henry ran a store and briefly manufactured Confederate uniforms. During the Civil War, the family fled to Montreal but remained financially comfortable; they studied at Bute House, and portraits of them by the society photographer William Notman survive at the McCord Museum in Montreal. The girls’ brother Dwight (1851–1887), who became a railroad cashier in New York, stole from the company and ended up in Sing Sing prison. The sisters all studied at Smith College. Clara and Susie also trained at the Académie Julian in Paris, Susie studied at the Pennsylvania Academy of the Fine Arts (her mentors over the years included Alice Barber Stephens, Rhoda Holmes Nicholls, Edward Percy Moran and Julius Rolshoven), and Bessie attended the Pennsylvania Museum and School of Industrial Art and Karl von Rydingsvard's woodcarving classes. The sisters traveled and painted along Cape Cod and eastern Canada and, in Europe, from Norway to Venice. They gave private art lessons and taught at Smith (their students included Blanche Ames), the Clarke School for the Deaf and nearby girls’ schools including Mary A. Burnham School, Miss Howard's and the MacDuffie School.

== Achievements ==
Clara, a member of the Woman's Art Club of New York, worked in oil, watercolor and pastel and was known for portraits, studies of flowers and views of Cape Cod, Holland, Cornwall, Brittany and Venice. (Her works are usually signed C. W. Lathrop.) She exhibited at venues including the Paris Salon (1891), 1893 World's Columbian Exposition (Palace of Fine Arts), Pennsylvania Academy of the Fine Arts (1887, 1891, 1895, 1898), Art Institute of Chicago (1889, 1892, 1896, 1898), Boston Art Club (1890, 1892), American Water Color Society (1892, 1898), Art Association of Indianapolis (1892), Gill's Art Galleries in Springfield (1889, 1890), Woman's Art Club (1892, 1893, 1894), National Academy of Design (1892, 1893), the Art Club of Philadelphia (1892, 1893) and the New York Water Color Club (1893, 1895, 1897). Critics lauded her work in publications including The Art Amateur, Quarterly Illustrator and the New York Times. The Springfield Republican praised her skill at rendering “every delicate shade imaginable” and observed that Susie “has a genius for figure drawing and character.” Susie worked mainly in watercolor and pen and ink, specializing in scenes of Greek mythology and rural Massachusetts. She exhibited at the Art Institute of Chicago (1889), American Water Color Society (1889, 1892, 1893), Boston Art Club (1890, 1891) and Art Club of Philadelphia (1892). She illustrated M. Helen Beckwith's children's book, In Mythland and Taber-Prang calendars with whist and musical motifs (1901, 1904), and she published sketches of local scenery in Picturesque Hampshire and The History of Florence, Massachusetts. Bessie, a member of the Society of Arts and Crafts of Boston, tooled leather and wood for furniture and panels in medieval and Renaissance styles. She showed at the 1893 World's Columbian Exposition (Woman's Building's Record Room), Detroit Architectural Club (1909) and Smith College (1913, 1914). The Springfield Republican described her furniture as evidence that her “hand is sure and her eye true." The sisters held group shows and intellectual salons at their studio in downtown Northampton (Bernard Berenson lectured there in 1894), which was draped with fishnets and packed with paintings, prints, embroideries, woodcarvings and ceramics.

== Later years ==
In 1906, Clara was appointed successor to Smith College art teacher Mary Rogers Williams (1857–1907). In June 1907, Clara died suddenly of meningitis. After her death, Bessie and Susie continued teaching but largely stopped exhibiting artwork. Institutions that own Lathrop pieces include the Smith College Museum of Art (Clara's portrait, A French Flower Girl, SC 1907:1-1), Harvard's Houghton Library (Clara's 1897 pastel portrait of Emily Dickinson's sister-in-law Susan, MS Am 1118.9) and the Emily Dickinson Museum (Bessie's triangular chair based on German models). Susie is portrayed at her easel outdoors in the Hestia Art Collective's 1980 mural, The History of Women in Northampton.

During the Hestia Mural 35th Anniversary Lecture on November 7, 2015, The New York Times contributor Eve M. Kahn spoke about the sisters' artistic salon, travels, exhibitions, and teaching posts, among other topics.

The sisters were buried next to each other at the Bridge Street Cemetery in Northampton.

== Papers ==
Historic Northampton owns Lathrop family letters, paintings, sketches, Bessie's tooled leather strip, photos including images of Bessie's carvings, a painted wood Dachshund made by a Clarke student, and extensive files about the sisters' careers. Northampton's Forbes Library also has Lathrop family documents.
