= Mary Whitney Phelps =

American Civil War figure

Mary Whitney Phelps (1812-1878) was a notable figure associated with the Missouri's Unions during the Civil War and the wife of John S. Phelps.

== Early life ==
Mary Whitney was born to a sea captain in Portland, Maine, in 1812 and was orphaned at a young age. The redhead soon married a man in an attempt to escape poverty but divorced when she found that they weren't a good match. She published a booklet around this time about the differences between a perfect society woman with no domestic skills and a woman who had housekeeping skills. Mary later moved to Hartford, Connecticut where she met her lifelong husband, John Smith Phelps. They got married in 1837 in Simsbury, Connecticut and moved to Springfield, Missouri in search of a new life. In Greene County, Missouri, Mary Phelps ordered the construction of a log cabin on a lot that they owned at the northwest corner of Short Benton Avenue and St. Louis Street. The cabin was completed in 1838 and Mary moved out of the Haden boarding house and moved into the cabin with her husband. Because of the struggling town and the negative influences, Mrs. Phelps and her family moved to a farm that they purchased south of the town when their children, John Elisha and Mary Anne, were ten and two years old. Mary was a stay-at-home mother during the time John Smith Phelps was serving in Congress starting in 1845. They also had a total of seventeen slaves helping run the Phelps family farm "Prairie Shade". Mary also operated a local school, helped deliver mail, and became a mule trader

== Civil War ==
During the Civil War, Mary stayed home to tend to the farm and operate the local school while her son was off fighting. She also collected and transported supplies to Union soldiers at the Battle of Wilson's Creek and Pea Ridge. One of Mary Phelps' most notable acts was after the Battle of Wilson's Creek on August 10, 1861. The Missouri Union lost the battle which resulted in the death of the Union commander Nathaniel Lyon, the first Union general to die in the war. Instead of fleeing the area, Mary stayed in Springfield to order a casket to bury Lyon until his family could claim the body. His family came all the way from Connecticut to claim the body later. She also continued to aid the Union and tend to the wounded and sick soldiers. Mary also organized several sewing groups to make new clothing for the soldiers. She even took care of the orphaned children of the deceased soldiers

== Post-War ==
At the end of the Civil War, in 1866, President Abraham Lincoln at the time, and the United States Congress recognized Mary Phelps' efforts during the war and awarded her $20,000. Mary used this money to establish an orphanage for the children who lost their fathers in the war. Mary became associated with the Confederate Burial Association because of her services during the Civil War. The association moved the remains of Confederate soldiers who died at Wilson's Creek to a new Confederate Cemetery by the Springfield National Cemetery. She also joined the National Woman’s Suffrage Association and later became its vice president in 1869. Mary lobbied the Missouri Legislature and Congress, advocating for women's right to vote in 1869 and 1870. John Smith Phelps became Governor in 1877 however, Mary was ill so she was not able to attend the inauguration. She died of pneumonia on January 15, 1878, at the Phelps farm. She became the First Lady of Missouri in 1877. Mary Whitney Phelps is currently buried beside John at the Hazelwood Cemetery in Springfield, Missouri

== Memoir ==
Mary Phelps had an unpublished memoir which was placed in a digital collection among other Civil War artifacts. The memoir and her letters were purchased by Wilson's Creek National Battlefield Foundation at a national auction and then donated to the Wilson's Creek National Battlefield, administered by the National Park Service. The memoir is missing at least 3 pages that talk about the Battle of Wilson's Creek. It discusses events before the war, Mary's role in it, the burial of General Lyon, and a collection of letters shared between Mary, her husband, and their daughter Mary Phelps Montgomery. These papers are available to the public from the library's Community and Conflict Digital Collection at www.ozarkscivilwar.org. The website is a collaboration between the Missouri State Library and Wilson's Creek National Battlefield to address the information gaps in midwestern history, and with the goal of telling the story of the Ozarks and the impact the Civil War had on them
