= Alta M. Hulett =

American lawyer (1854–1877)

Alta M. Hulett (4 June 1854 near Rockford, Illinois – 27 March 1877, in California) was an American lawyer.

She learned telegraphy when only 10, and for some time was a successful operator. Subsequently she taught school, and employed her leisure in the study of law. In 1872 she passed the required examination and applied for admission to the bar, but was rejected on account of her sex. She then worked toward securing the passage of a bill through the state legislature, giving all women, whether married or single, the right to practise law. Succeeding in this, she went to Chicago, where she spent a year in an office, after which she was again examined, admitted to the bar, and began the practice of law.

== Career ==
Hulett studied law with William Lathrop in Rockford, Illinois, and became the first woman admitted to the bar in Illinois in 1873. She practiced law in Chicago, Illinois, for three years. In failing health, she moved to California in 1876, where she died March 27, 1877, aged 22 years.

== See also ==
  - List of first women lawyers and judges in Illinois
