= Leland Hotel (Springfield, Illinois) =

Coordinates: 39°47′55″N 89°38′54″W

The Leland Hotel in Springfield, Illinois, is a building that currently houses the Springfield office of the Illinois Commerce Commission. It was built between 1864 and 1867 at a cost of $320,000. Much of the food served at the Leland Hotel was grown on the Leland family farm in present-day Leland Grove.

The horseshoe sandwich, a local food specialty, was first served at the Leland Hotel in 1928.
