= Ellen A. Martin =

American lawyer

Ellen Annette Martin
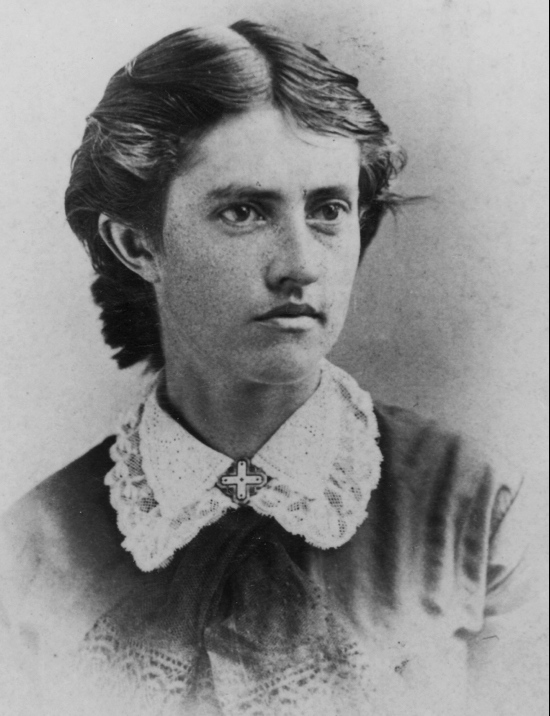
- Born: January 16, 1847; Kiantone, New York
- Died: March 13, 1916 (aged 69); Rochester, New York
- Education: University of Michigan
- Occupations: Lawyer, Suffragist
- Parent(s): Abram and Mary Eliza (Burnham) Martin

Ellen Annette Martin (January 16, 1847 – March 13, 1916) was an early and little-known American attorney who achieved an early victory in securing women's suffrage in Illinois. She was the first woman to vote in Illinois.

== Biography ==
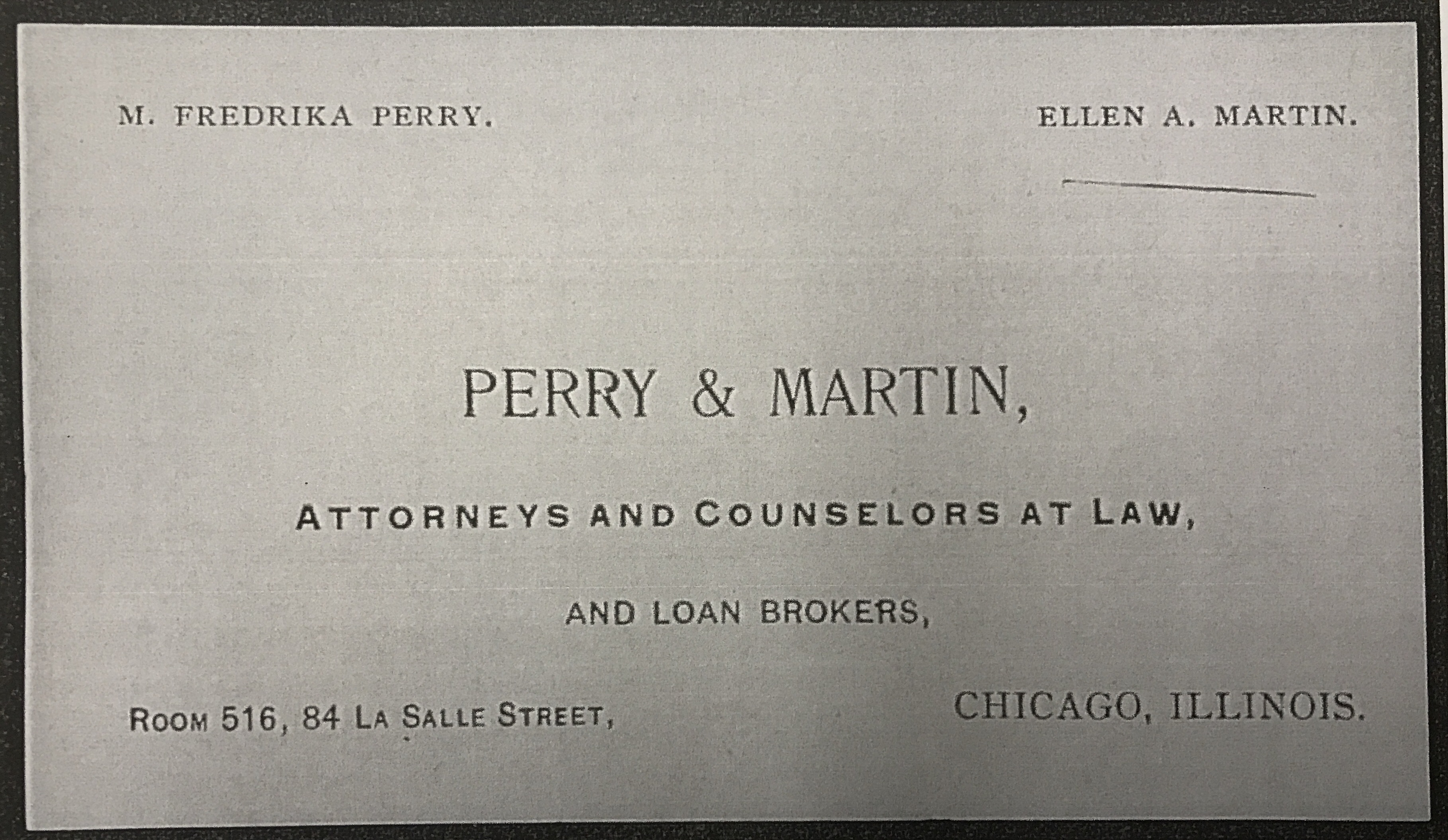
The business card for Ellen Martin's Chicago law practice, Perry & Martin Attorneys and Counselors at Law

Ellen Martin graduated the University of Michigan, Ann Arbor law school in 1875 and was admitted to the Illinois bar in 1876. She was also a member of the National Women's Suffrage Association, an early group organizing for women's suffrage.

On April 6, 1891, in Lombard, Illinois, Ellen Martin led a group of 14 prominent women to the voting place at the general store. Although suffrage was restricted to men in Illinois at that time, Lombard was governed by its pre-1870 compact which omitted any mention of gender. Miss Martin therefore demanded that the three male election judges allow the women to vote. Reportedly, the voting judges were flabbergasted by Miss Martin: "Mr. Marquardt was taken with a spasm, Reber leaned stiff against the wall, and Vance fell backward into the flour barrel."

A county judge eventually proclaimed the legitimacy of the women's votes, which became the first women's votes tabulated in Illinois history. Thus, Ellen Martin was the first woman in Illinois to vote. However, the men of Lombard quickly reorganized the town charter in line with the state charter, so that women were only allowed to vote in school elections. By 1916, Illinois women could vote in presidential elections, and for all statutory offices, and the 19th Amendment (the Women's Suffrage Amendment) was passed in 1920.

== Legacy ==
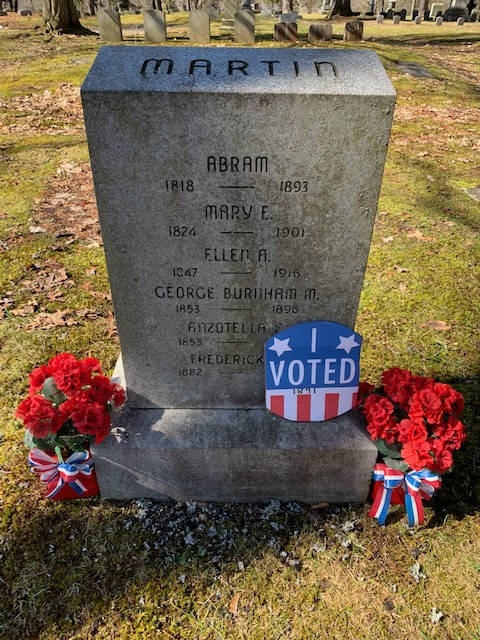
Grave of Ellen Martin, Jamestown, NY

In 2008, the city of Lombard, Illinois, declared April 6 to be "Ellen Martin Day" in commemoration of Ms. Martin's historic victory for women's suffrage.

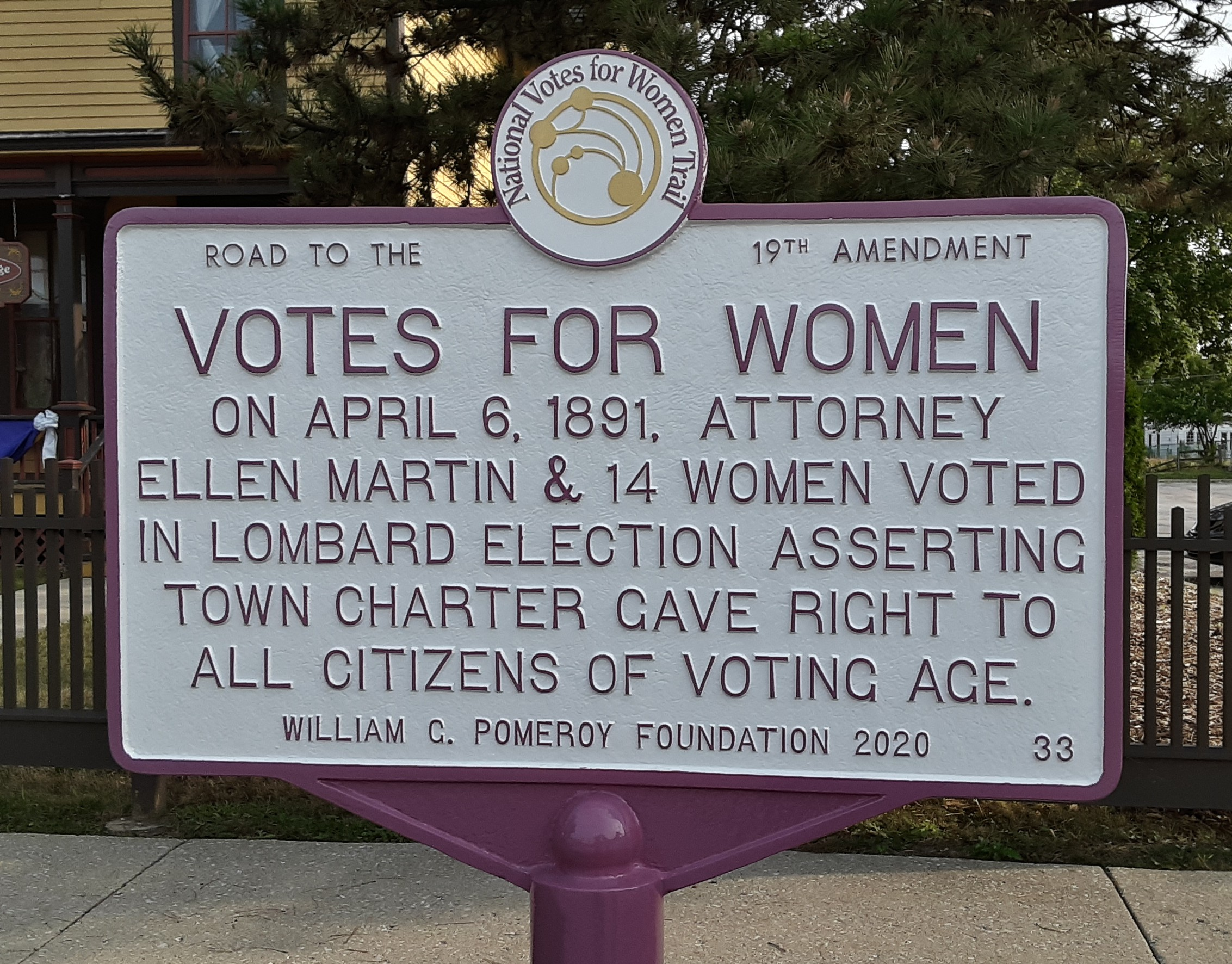
Marker commemorating Ellen Martin, located at the Lombard Historical Society

The Lombard Historical Society filmed a reenactment of Ellen Martin voting with other Illinois women before Illinois women's suffrage.

== See also ==
- List of first women lawyers and judges in Illinois
- List of American Suffragists
- List of American Suffragists by State
