= Antoinette Funk =

American lawyer

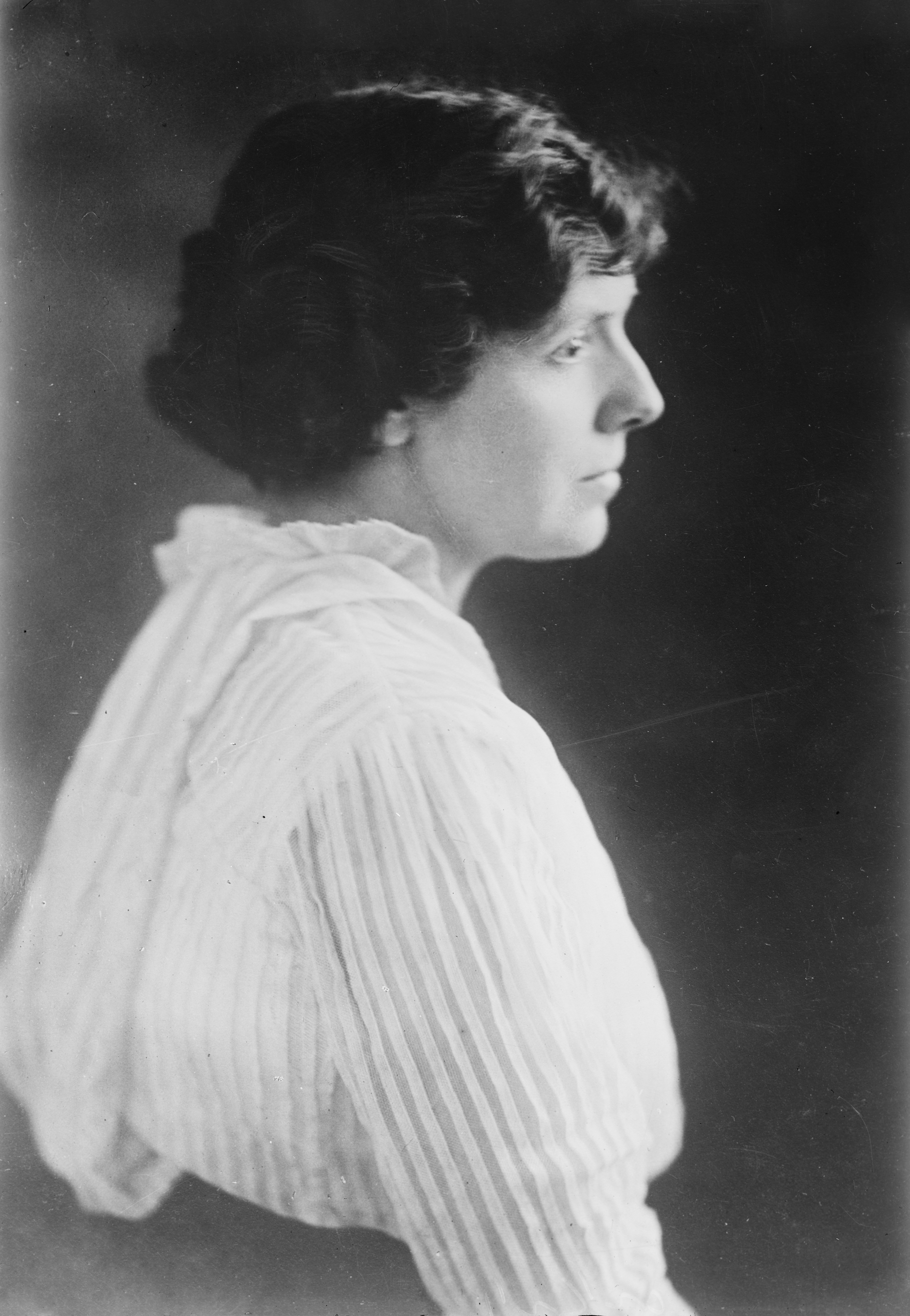
- Funk circa 1920
- Born: Marie Antoinette Leland; May 30, 1873; Dwight, Illinois
- Died: March 26, 1942 (aged 68); San Diego, California, US
- Education: Illinois Wesleyan University (J.D.)
- Occupations: Lawyer, activist
- Years active: 1913–1939
- Known for: Contributions to the women's rights movement
- Spouse: Isaac Lincoln Funk

Antoinette Funk (May 30, 1873 – March 26, 1942) was a lawyer and women's rights advocate during the 20th century. She served as the executive secretary of the Congressional Committee of the National American Woman Suffrage Association.

== Biography ==
She was born on May 30, 1873, in Dwight, Illinois, as Marie Antoinette Leland to Cyrus Leland and Virginia Antoinette Bouverain Leland. In 1892, she married Charles Thurber Watrous, who died shortly after the marriage. They had one child, Anna Virginia Watrous (Huey)(1893-1973).

In 1893, she married Isaac Lincoln Funk. They had a child Rey Leland Funk. In 1898, she attended Illinois Wesleyan University Law School, where she received J.D. In 1902, she moved to Chicago, where her work for women's rights would begin.

As part of her women's rights advocacy, Funk gave speeches to women's rights groups.

In 1914, Funk rode stagecoaches across South Dakota and Nevada. She gave speeches several times a day, speaking at sits ranging from mines to the homes of butchers to organized dinner dances. Funk particularly enjoyed speaking outdoors because it exposed passersby to her message. On October 2, 1914, Funk was jailed in Minot, North Dakota for making an unauthorized street speech.

In 1915, she addressed the College Equal Suffrage League of Bryn Mawr College in a speech entitled "The Best Arguments for Woman Suffrage."

In 1917, she also supported the United States war effort during World War I along with other women's rights advocates as a member of the Women's Committee of the Council of Defense. In 1918, Funk was the vice chairman of the woman's liberty loan Committee at the Treasury Department.

During Franklin Delano Roosevelt's administration, Funk served as Assistant Commissioner of the Land Office.

She retired from the NAWSA in 1939. In 1942, she died in San Diego, California.

== See also ==
- List of suffragists and suffragettes
