= Catharine Waugh McCulloch =

American lawyer

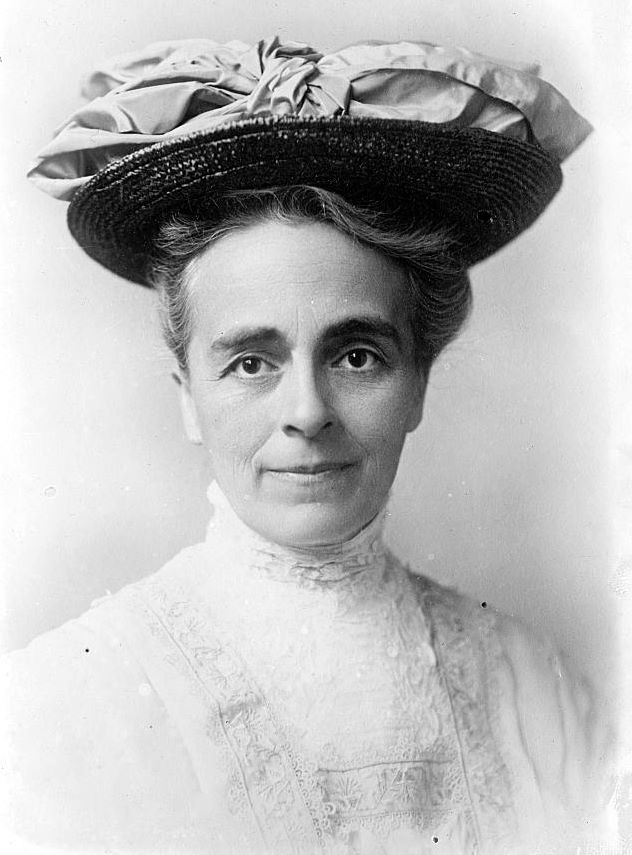
- Catharine Waugh McCulloch
- Born: Catharine Gouger Waugh; June 4, 1862; New York state
- Died: April 20, 1945 (aged 82)
- Education: Rockford Female Seminary; Union College of Law
- Occupations: Attorney, Suffragist
- Spouse: Frank Hawthorn McCulloch (m. 1890)

Catharine Gouger Waugh McCulloch (June 4, 1862 – April 20, 1945) was an American lawyer, suffragist, and reformer. She actively lobbied for women's suffrage at the local, state, and national levels as a leader in the Illinois Equal Suffrage Association, Chicago Political Equality League, and National American Woman Suffrage Association. She was the first woman elected Justice of the Peace in Illinois.

== Early life and education ==
Catharine Waugh was born in New York to Susan Gouger and Abraham Miller Waugh. She was of French and Irish ancestry. Raised in Illinois, she graduated from Rockford Female Seminary in 1882, where she wrote a thesis on women's wages and earned both a B.A. and M.A. degree. Waugh then attended Chicago's Union College of Law (now Northwestern Pritzker School of Law). After graduating and passing the bar in 1886, Waugh sought employment in Chicago but faced gender discrimination. She returned to Rockford, Illinois and started her own practice.

== Marriage and family ==
In 1890, Catharine Waugh married her former law school classmate, Frank Hathorn McCulloch. They moved to Chicago and merged practices to form the law firm of McCulloch and McCulloch. Catharine sought equality in her relationship as both a private and political arrangement. According to letters she sent to colleagues, she believed her marriage to McCulloch helped advance her career. She raised four children: Hugh Waugh, Hathorn Waugh, Catharine Waugh, and Frank Waugh.

== Career ==
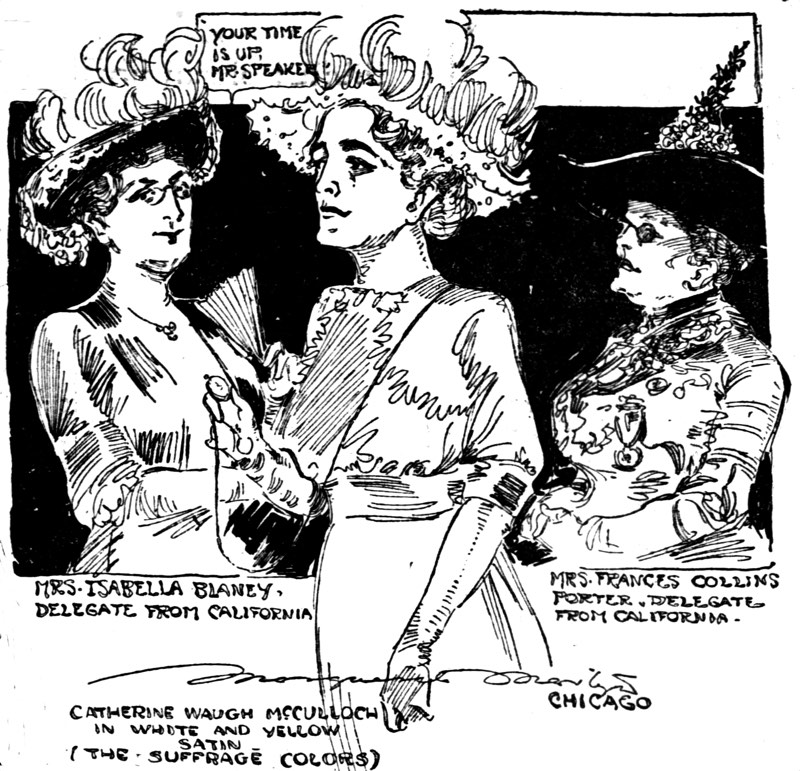
Catharine Waugh McCulloch, center, is flanked by Isabella W. Blaney and Frances Collins Porter, both of California, in this 1912 drawing by Marguerite Martyn. They were among the first women delegates to a Republican National Convention.

McCulloch was a member of the Equity Club, a correspondence network founded in 1887 to provide support, friendship, and advice among women lawyers across the country. In 1888, McCulloch unsuccessfully ran for state's attorney on the Prohibition party ticket.

McCulloch began serving as the legislative chair of the Illinois Equal Suffrage Association in 1890. Following an 1891 Illinois Supreme Court decision upholding women's right to vote in school district elections, she developed a legislative strategy to expand women's voting rights without requiring an amendment to the Illinois Constitution. McCulloch drafted legislation that would allow women to vote for presidential electors and other offices not constitutionally restricted to men, introducing versions of the bill in the Illinois General Assembly for approximately twenty years before its passage in 1913. The law made Illinois the first state east of the Mississippi River to grant women the right to vote for presidential electors, and it was upheld by the Illinois Supreme Court in Scown v. Czarnecki (1914).. She and her colleagues in the Illinois Equal Suffrage Association actively lobbied for the measure throughout that period, organizing train and automobile tours, public meetings, and publications to build statewide support.

McCulloch's public-oriented methods of mobilizing supporters reflected the approach of many clubwomen, settlement-house workers, and other Progressive Era reformers who viewed woman suffrage as part of a broader program of social reform. Her approach contrasted with that of more conservative members of the Illinois Equal Suffrage Association, such as Grace Wilbur Trout, who favored quieter and more diplomatic lobbying methods..

In 1894, McCulloch and fellow members of the Chicago Woman's Club founded the Chicago Political Equity League to campaign for municipal suffrage. In addition to her suffrage work, McCulloch advocated for maternalist reform measures. For example, she championed the passage of a law in 1901 that gave women equal guardianship with their husbands over their children. In 1905, she helped raise the age of consent for girls from 14 to 16 years.

McCulloch was elected Justice of the Peace in Evanston, Illinois in 1907 (and re-elected in 1909), trouncing her male competitor and making McCulloch the first woman elected to that office in Illinois. In an attempt to challenge McCulloch's position, the attorney for McCulloch's male opponent claimed that women were ineligible to hold all constitutional offices in the state because they were not eligible voters. However, Illinois's state attorney general advised the governor to grant McCulloch's commission, leaving her competitor the option to pursue the constitutional objection in court. Instead of challenging the eligibility of her commission in court, McCulloch's male competitor tried to best her in the next election, losing yet again.

While a Justice of the Peace, McCulloch made national headlines by agreeing to conduct egalitarian marriage ceremonies in which she omitted the word "obey" from the ritualized words the woman was supposed to say; at that time, the man pledged to "love, honor and cherish" while the woman pledged to "love, honor and obey."

In 1916, she was the first woman to be nominated by a major party as a presidential elector. She led the Democratic ticket statewide, winning 950,229 votes — by far the most ever won in an election by a woman to that point. But the Republican victory in Illinois prevented her from actually serving in the Electoral College.

In 1917, she was appointed as a master in chancery of the Cook County Superior Court. She became known for her advocacy in working to eliminate or modify marriage and divorce laws that discriminated against women, and she worked to create uniformity of such laws in all states.

She was the legal adviser for the National American Woman Suffrage Association (which became the League of Women Voters in 1920 after passage of the 19th Amendment) and was its first vice president. She also served as the legal adviser for the National Women's Christian Temperance Union.

McCulloch died of cancer in 1945 at the age of 82. Catharine W. McCulloch Park in Evanston is named for her.

== Publications ==
- Bittenbender, Ada M. "Women in Law," in Farmer, Lydia Hoyt. The national exposition souvenir: what America owes to women Buffalo: C. W. Moulton, 1893. Pages 390–408.
- Drysdale, William. "The Woman Lawyer," in Helps for ambitious girls New York: T. Y. Crowell & Co., c1900. Pages 180–208.
- "Law," in Training for the professions and allied occupations: facilities available to women in the United States. New York: Bureau of Vocational Information, 1924. Pages 427–450.
- McCulloch, Catharine Waugh. "Women as Law Clerks" manuscript. c1887. (12 pages).
- Bureau of Vocational Information (New York). Records, 1908–1932: A Finding Aid
- Mr. Lex, Or The Legal Status of Mother and Child. Chicago: Fleming H. Revell Company, 1899, 85 pp.
