= Willard House =

Willard House or Willard Homestead may refer to:

in the United States (by state)

- Willard House (Cottonwood, Arizona), listed on the National Register of Historic Places (NRHP) in Arizona
- Willard Homestead (Newington, Connecticut), NRHP-listed
- Frances Willard House (Evanston, Illinois), a U.S. National Historic Landmark
- Leroy R. Willard House, Marshalltown, Iowa, NRHP-listed
- George Willard House, Jefferson, Maryland, NRHP-listed
- Willard House and Clock Museum, Grafton, Massachusetts, NRHP-listed
- Willard-Fisk House, Holden, Massachusetts, NRHP-listed
- Willard Homestead (Harrisville, New Hampshire), NRHP-listed
- Dr. Sylvester Willard Mansion, Auburn, New York, listed on the NRHP in Cayuga County, New York
- Frances Willard House (Chattanooga, Tennessee), listed on the NRHP in Tennessee
- Willard-Clark House, Maryville, Tennessee, listed on the NRHP in Tennessee
- Emma Willard House, Middlebury, Vermont, NRHP-listed
- Willard Building (Longview, Washington), listed on the NRHP in Washington
- Willard Hotel, Washington, D.C., NRHP-listed
- Frances Willard Schoolhouse, Janesville, Wisconsin, NRHP-listed
- Willard House (Deerfield, Massachusetts), historic home of Samuel Willard

== See also ==
- Frances Willard House (disambiguation)
