= Morilla M. Norton =

American author & French literature scholar (1865–1916)

- Born: September 1865; Monroe County, New York, U.S.
- Died: 1916; Tokyo, Japan
- Resting place: Yokohama, Japan
- Education: Sorbonne; Collège de France
- Occupations: author; poet
- Relatives: Mary Willard (aunt); Frances Willard (cousin)
- Writing career
- Pen name: M. M. Norton
- Genres: non-fiction; poetry
- Subject: Philippines

Morilla M. Norton (pen name M. M. Norton; 1865-1916) was an American author of prose and poetry, as well as a specialist in French literature. Several of her books were set in the Philippines where she made her home.

== Early life and education ==
Morilla M. (Note: Willard & Livermore recorded her middle name as Maria, while New Hampshire Reports recorded it as Morrill.) Norton was born in Monroe County, New York in September 1865. (Note: According to Willard & Livermore, Norton was born in Ogden, New York, on September 11, 1865, while according to New Hampshire Reports, Norton was born in Churchville, New York, on September 22, 1865.)

Her father was Rev. Smith Norton, descended from the Maine and Massachusetts families of Norton and Weston, and her mother was Morilla E. Hill Norton, who died in the early infancy of her only daughter. She was a niece of Mary Thompson Hill Willard, mother of Frances E. Willard. Norton's maternal ancestors, the Hills, the Thompsons and the Morrills, of New Hampshire and Vermont, were among those characterized as the foremost citizens and patriots of their time. Her great-grandfather, Abraham Morrill, was a member of John Stark's brigade in the Battle of Bennington.

Norton received her education through study at home and in some of the best private schools of Boston, Massachusetts. She spent the five years, 1886 to 1891, in Europe. During the first year, she studied chiefly in Berlin. She spent some months in Saint Petersburg, Russia, traveled in Germany and Italy, where she paid especial attention to art, and studied in excellent French families in the Jura Mountains and in Lausanne, Switzerland. She has also traveled in England, Holland, Switzerland, Belgium and France, and resided three-and-a-half years in Paris, a student, under private professors and in the Sorbonne and Collège de France, of the French language and literature, which was her specialty. She took extended courses in the Sorbonne and College de France in English literature, in Italian history and art, and the political history of Europe, but devoted most of her time and energies to a study of the French poets, philosophers, moralists, dramatists, critics and novelists, from the earliest times to her present-day. She spoke French with ease and purity. After her return to the U.S., in 1891, she devoted herself to the preparation of courses of lectures on French literature, to be delivered before literary clubs and classes.

== Career ==
Norton's productions were published by the Atlantic Monthly, Boston Transcript, New York Observer and other journals. Her travel works included Outposts of Asia: Exploring the Geopolitical Tapestry of Asia in Interconnected Narratives, The Southern Isles: An Illustrated Three Week Trip Among the Many Picturesque Places of Historical Interest in the Southern Philippine Islands, Studies in Philippine architecture, and Guide to Manila Catholic Churches. Songs of the Pacific was a book of poems dedicated to the sailors of the United States Navy on the "Big Cruise". Other poetry collections included Songs of Heroes and Days and Verses from the Orient. Her French language, Montcalm,, was printed in Quebec.

== Personal life ==
She was a member of the church connected with the American Chapel in Paris.

She was a resident of Warner, New Hampshire, 1885-1888, Beloit, Wisconsin, and later in life, in Connecticut and Manila, Philippines.

== Death ==
Norton died at Tokyo, Japan, in 1916, from a lingering illness. She went there from Manila to collect material for a new bock. Funeral services were held in Yokohama.

== Selected works ==
- Gloria Victis, 1900 (text)
- Songs of the Pacific, 1908
- Outposts of Asia: Exploring the Geopolitical Tapestry of Asia in Interconnected Narratives, 1909
- Songs of Heroes and Days, 1909 {text}
- The Southern Isles: An Illustrated Three Week Trip Among the Many Picturesque Places of Historical Interest in the Southern Philippine Islands, 1909 (text)
- Quills and Seals, 1910 (text)
- Charity in the Philippines, 1911 (text)
- Studies in Philippine architecture, 1911 (text)
- Builders of a Nation: A Series of Biographical Sketches by M. M. Norton, 1914 (text)
- Guide to Manila Catholic Churches, 1915
- Montcalm
- Verses from the Orient
