= Frances Willard =

American temperance activist and suffragist (1839–1898)

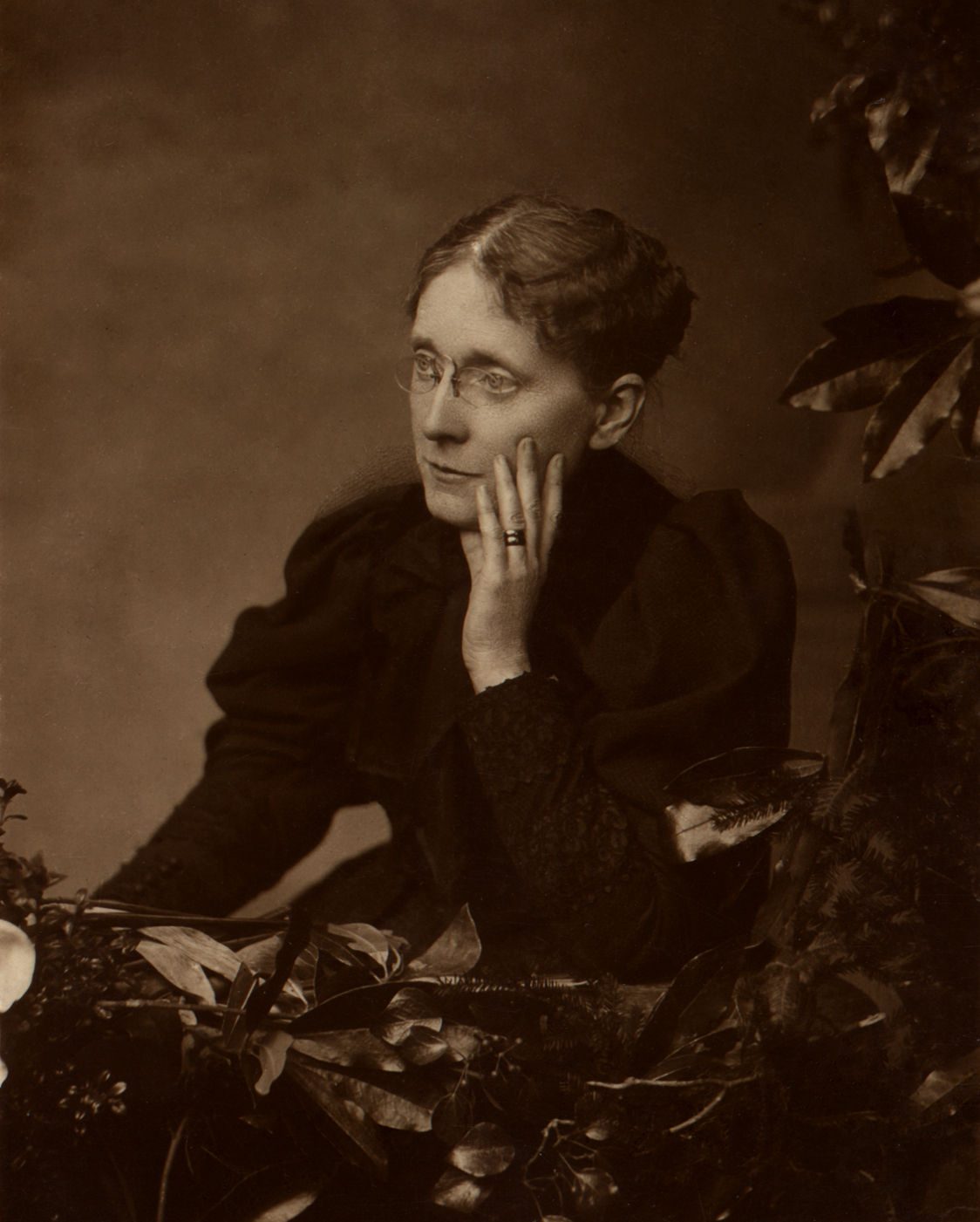
- Willard, Frances E.C. 1890-98
- Born: Frances Elizabeth Caroline Willard; September 28, 1839; Churchville, New York, US
- Died: February 17, 1898 (aged 58); New York City, US
- Known for: First dean of women, Northwestern University; long-time president, Woman's Christian Temperance Union; founder, World's Woman's Christian Temperance Union; first president, National Council of Women of the United States

Signature
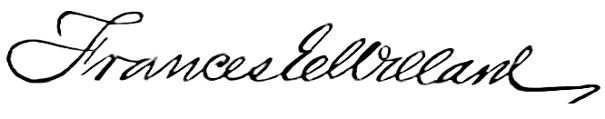

Frances Elizabeth Caroline Willard (September 28, 1839 – February 17, 1898) was an American educator, temperance reformer, and women's suffragist. Willard became the national president of Woman's Christian Temperance Union (WCTU) in 1879 and remained president until her death in 1898. Her influence continued in the next decades, as the Eighteenth (on Prohibition) and Nineteenth (on women's suffrage) Amendments to the United States Constitution were adopted. Willard developed the slogan "Do Everything" for the WCTU and encouraged members to engage in a broad array of social reforms by lobbying, petitioning, preaching, publishing, and education.

Willard's accomplishments include raising the age of consent in many states and passing labor reforms, most notably including the eight-hour work day. She also advocated for prison reform, scientific temperance instruction, Christian socialism, and the global expansion of women's rights.

== Early life and education ==
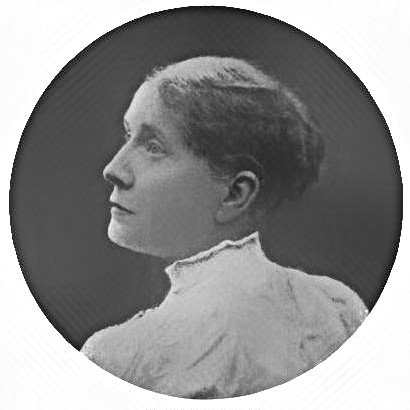
Frances Willard

Willard was born in 1839 to Josiah Flint Willard and Mary Thompson Hill Willard in Churchville, near Rochester, New York. She was named after English novelist Frances (Fanny) Burney, the American poet Frances Osgood, and her sister, Elizabeth Caroline, who had died the previous year. She had two other siblings: her older brother, Oliver, and her younger sister, Mary. Her father was a farmer, naturalist, and legislator. Her mother was a schoolteacher. In 1841 the family moved to Oberlin, Ohio, where, at Oberlin College Josiah Willard studied for the ministry, and Mary Hill Willard took classes. They moved to Janesville, Wisconsin in 1846 for Josiah Willard's health. In Wisconsin, the family, formerly Congregationalists, became Methodists. Josiah Willard served as a volunteer observer for the Smithsonian Institution in the 1850s, recording and reporting daily meteorological data from Janesville. During the winter months of 1856-1858 when Josiah Willard traveled south for his health, Frances assumed responsibility for conducing the meteorological observations and communicating with the Smithsonian Institution. Frances and her sister Mary attended Milwaukee Normal Institute, where their mother's sister taught.

In 1858, the Willard family moved to Evanston, Illinois, and Josiah Willard became a banker. Frances and Mary attended the North Western Female College (no affiliation with Northwestern University) and their brother Oliver attended the Garrett Biblical Institute.

== Teaching career ==
After graduating from North Western Female College, Willard held various teaching positions throughout the country. She worked at the Pittsburgh Female College, and, as preceptress at the Genesee Wesleyan Seminary in New York (later Syracuse University). She was appointed president of the newly founded Evanston College for Ladies in 1871. When the Evanston College for Ladies became the Woman's College of Northwestern University in 1873, Willard was named the first Dean of Women at the university. However, that position was to be short-lived with her resignation in 1874 after confrontations with the University President, Charles Henry Fowler, over her governance of the Woman's College. Willard had previously been engaged to Fowler and had broken off the engagement.

== Activist (WCTU and suffrage) ==
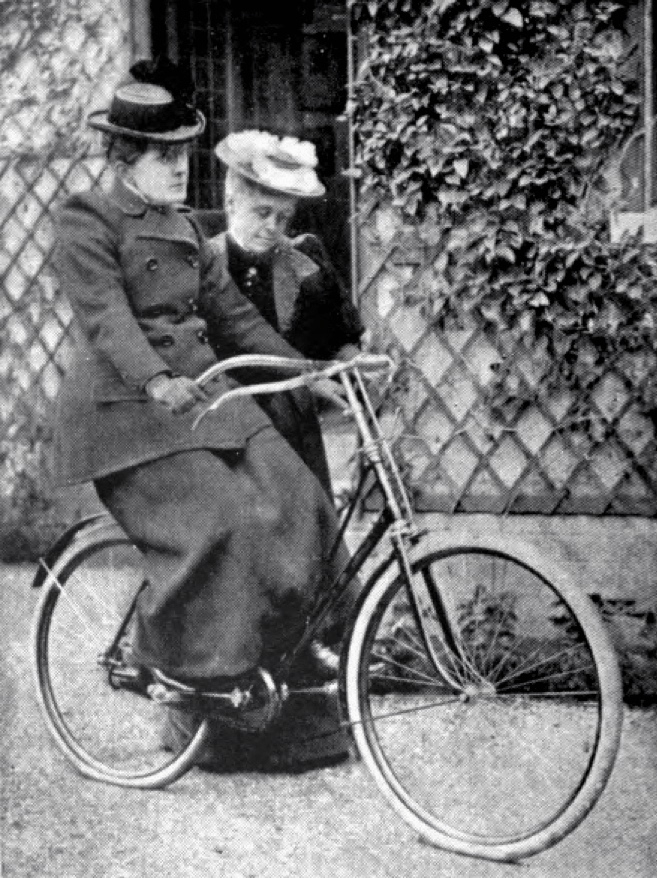
"Let go — but stand by"; Frances Willard learning to ride a bicycle

After her resignation, Willard focused her energies on a new career: the women's temperance movement. In 1874, Willard participated in the founding convention of the Woman's Christian Temperance Union (WCTU) where she was elected the first Corresponding Secretary. In 1876, she became head of the WCTU Publications Department, focusing on publishing and building a national audience for the WCTU's weekly newspaper, The Union Signal. In 1885 Willard joined with Elizabeth Boynton Harbert, Mary Ellen West, Frances Conant, Mary Crowell Van Benschoten (Willard's first secretary) and 43 others to found the Illinois Woman's Press Association.

In 1879, she sought and successfully obtained presidency of the National WCTU. Once elected, she held the post until her death. Her tireless efforts for the temperance cause included a 50-day speaking tour in 1874, an average of 30,000 miles of travel a year, and an average of 400 lectures a year for a 10-year period, mostly with the assistance of her personal secretary, Anna Adams Gordon.

Meanwhile, Willard sought to expand WCTU membership in the South, and met Varina Davis, the wife of former Confederate President Jefferson Davis, who was secretary of the local chapter of the Women's Christian Association in Memphis (where one daughter lived). Willard had tried and failed to convince Lucy Hayes (wife of President Rutherford B. Hayes) to assist the temperance cause, but writer Sallie F. Chapin, a former Confederate sympathizer who had published a temperance novel, supported Willard and was a friend of the Davises. In 1887, Davis invited Willard to her home to discuss the future of her unmarried daughter Winnie Davis, but both Davis women declined to become public supporters, in part because Jefferson Davis opposed legal prohibition. In 1887, Texas held a referendum on temperance, in part because former Confederate postmaster John Reagan supported temperance laws. When newspapers published a photograph of Willard handing Jefferson Davis a temperance button to give to his wife, Jefferson Davis publicly came out against the referendum (as contrary to states' rights) and it lost. Although Varina Davis and Willard would continue to correspond over the next decade (as Varina moved to New York after her husband's death, and Willard spent most of her last decade abroad); another temperance referendum would not occur for two decades.

As president of the WCTU, Willard also argued for female suffrage, based on "Home Protection," which she described as "the movement … the object of which is to secure for all women above the age of twenty-one years the ballot as one means for the protection of their homes from the devastation caused by the legalized traffic in strong drink." The "devastation" referred to violent acts against women committed by intoxicated men, which was common both in and outside the home. Willard argued that it was too easy for men to get away with their crimes without women's suffrage. The "Home Protection" argument was used to garner the support of the "average woman," who was told to be suspicious of female suffragists by the patriarchal press, religious authorities, and society as a whole. The desire for home protection gave the average woman a socially appropriate avenue to seek enfranchisement. Willard insisted that women must forgo the notions that they were the "weaker" sex and that they must embrace their natural dependence on men. She encouraged women to join the movement to improve society: "Politics is the place for woman." The goal of the suffrage movement for Willard was to construct an "ideal of womanhood" that allowed women to fulfill their potential as the companions and counselors of men, as opposed to the "incumbrance and toy of man."

Willard's suffrage argument also hinged on her feminist interpretation of Scripture. She claimed that natural and divine laws called for equality in the American household, with the mother and father sharing leadership. She expanded this notion of the home, arguing that men and women should lead side by side in matters of education, church, and government, just as "God sets male and female side by side throughout his realm of law."

Willard's work took to an international scale in 1883 with the circulation of the Polyglot Petition against the international drug trade. She also joined May Wright Sewall at the International Council of Women meeting in Washington, DC, laying the permanent foundation for the National Council of Women of the United States. She became the organization's first president in 1888 and continued in that post until 1890. Willard also founded the World WCTU in 1888 and became its president in 1893. She collaborated closely with Lady Isabel Somerset, president of the British Women's Temperance Association, whom she visited several times in the United Kingdom.

In 1892 she took part in the St. Louis convention during the formation of the People's (or Populist) Party. The convention was brought a set of principles that was drafted in Chicago, Illinois, by her and twenty-eight of the United States' leading reformers, whom had assembled at her invitation. However, the new party refused to endorse women's suffrage or temperance because it wanted to focus on economic issues.

After 1893, Willard was influenced by the British Fabian Society and became a committed Christian socialist.

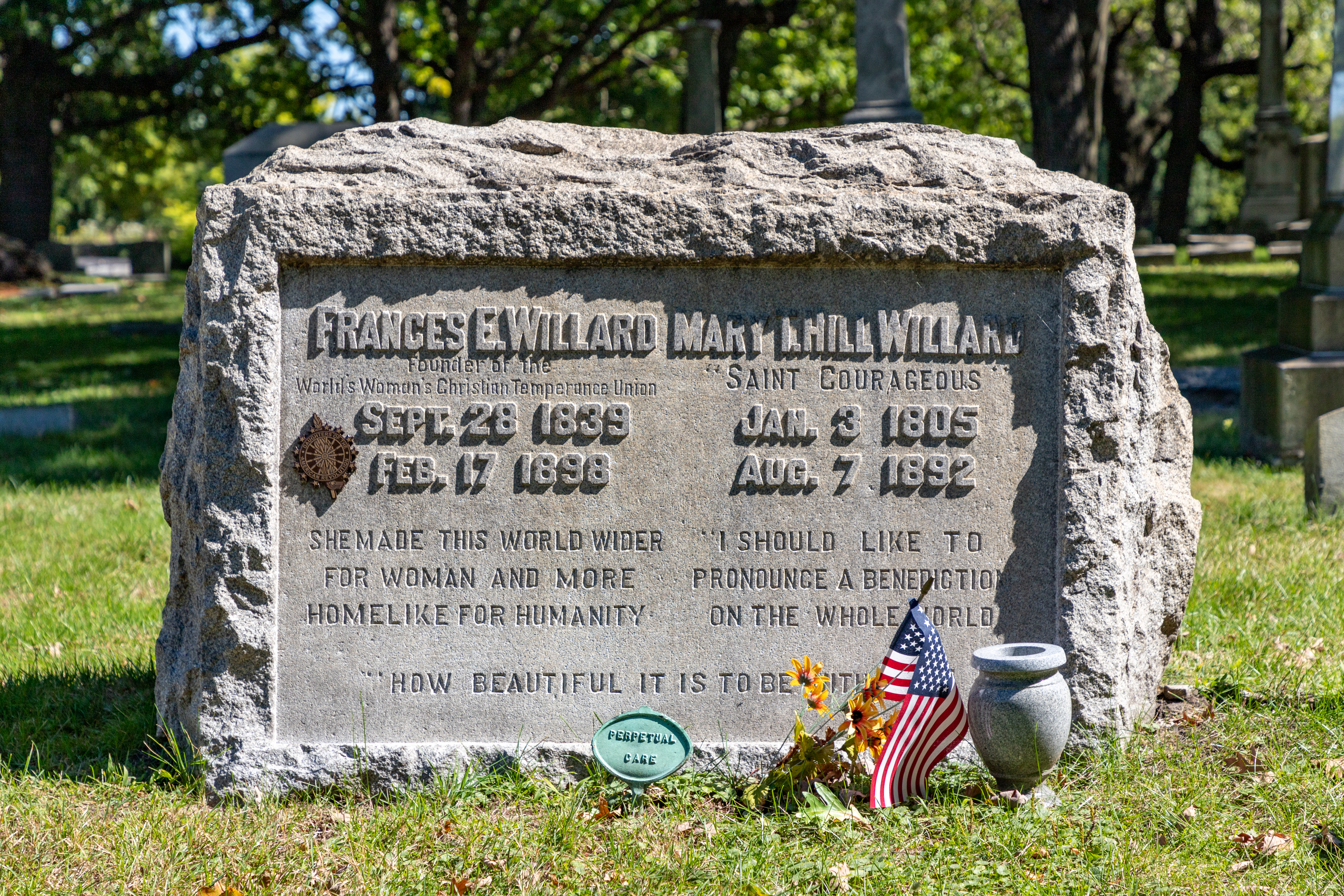
Willard Grave stone

== Death ==
In 1898, Willard died quietly in her sleep at the Empire Hotel in New York City after contracting influenza while she was preparing to set sail for England and France. She is buried at Rosehill Cemetery, Chicago, Illinois.

Frances Willard and her mother Mary Thompson Hill Willard are interred at Rosehill Cemetery in Chicago. She bequeathed her Evanston home to the WCTU. The Frances Willard House was opened as a museum in 1900 when it also became the headquarters for the WCTU. In 1965 it was elevated to the status of National Historic Landmark.

== Legacy ==
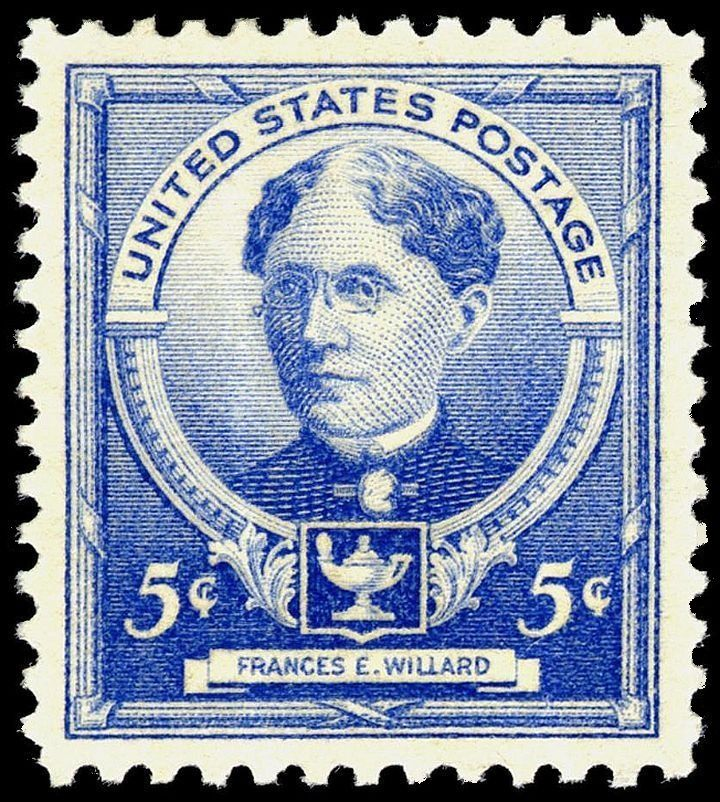

=== National political and civic memory ===
Willard was the first woman included among America's greatest leaders represented in National Statuary Hall in the United States Capitol. Her statue was designed by Helen Farnsworth Mears and was unveiled in 1905.

Willard is commemorated on a United States postage stamp released on March 28, 1940, as part of the Famous Americans series.

In 2000, Willard was inducted into the National Women's Hall of Fame.

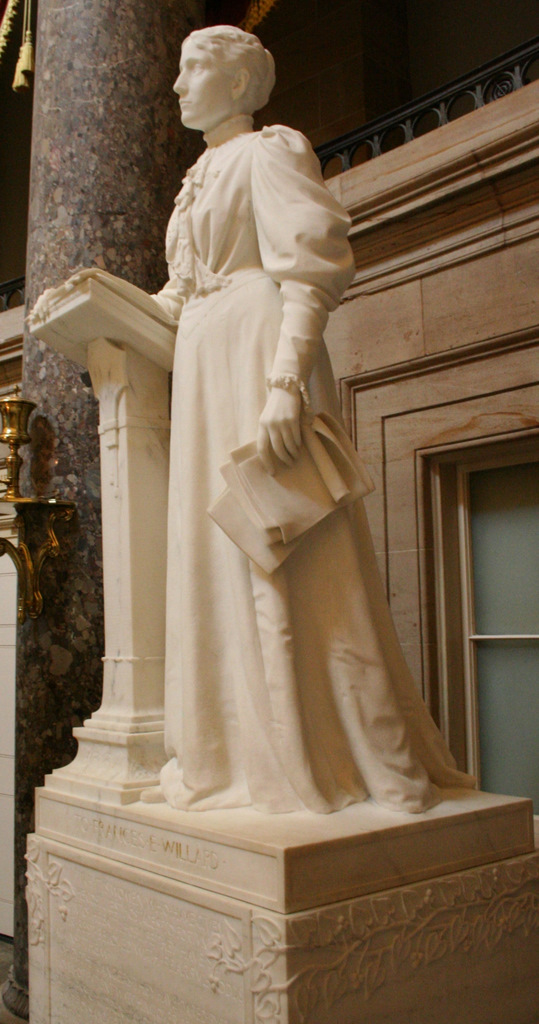
Willard statue on display in the National Statuary Hall of the Capitol Building

=== Women’s movement and reform legacy ===
Frances Willard is extensively commemorated through institutions and artworks associated with the women’s reform and temperance movements.

The famous painting, American Woman and her Political Peers, commissioned by Henrietta Briggs-Wall for the 1893 Chicago Columbian Exposition, features Frances Willard at the center, surrounded by a convict, American Indian, lunatic, and an idiot. The image succinctly portrayed one argument for female enfranchisement: without the right to vote, the educated, respectable woman was equated with the other outcasts of society to whom the franchise was denied.

In 1929, a relief of Frances Elizabeth Willard by Lorado Taft, commissioned by the National Woman's Christian Temperance Union, was installed in the Indiana Statehouse, Indianapolis, Indiana. The plaque commemorates the fiftieth anniversary of Willard's election as president of the WCTU on October 31, 1879: "In honor of one who made the world wider for women and more homelike for humanity Frances Elizabeth Willard Intrepid Pathfinder and beloved leader of the National and World's Woman's Christian Temperance Union."

The WCTU also sponsored memorials and buildings bearing Willard’s name in multiple countries. Willard Hall in Temperance Temple, Chicago, was named in her honor. In 1911, the Willard Hall and Willard Guest House in Wakefield Street, Adelaide, South Australia were opened by the South Australian branch of the WCTU.

The Frances E. Willard Temperance Hospital operated under that name from 1929 to 1936 in Chicago. It is now Loretto Hospital in the Austin neighborhood of Chicago.

=== Education and intellectual legacy ===
Frances Willard is commemorated through numerous educational institutions at the university, secondary, and primary levels, reflecting the enduring association of her legacy with education, reform, and civic leadership.

At the postsecondary level, Willard Residential College at Northwestern University opened in 1938 as a female dormitory and became the university's first undergraduate co-ed housing in 1970.

Willard Hall Oklahoma State University in Stillwater, Oklahoma was also constructed in 1938 as a women's dormitory. It housed just over 400 women each year until 1986. After being used for storage for several years, the University invested $9.8 million into renovating the building in 1995. The renovation added a large lecture hall, modern classrooms, labs, and faculty offices. The new purpose of the building was to serve as the home of the College of Education, a role it continues to fill today.

Willard’s name is also borne by numerous secondary and primary schools across the United States. These include Willard Middle School in Berkeley. established in 1916, and multiple elementary schools in Evanston, River Forest, Pasadena, Norfolk, and Scranton. The Frances E. Willard Elementary School in Norfolk later became Willard Junior High School in 1960.

Several school buildings named for Willard have also been recognized for their historical significance. The Frances Willard Schoolhouse in Janesville, Wisconsin, was added to the National Register of Historic Places in 1977, followed by the Frances E. Willard School in Philadelphia in 1987.

=== Local and regional commemorations ===
Frances Willard is commemorated in a variety of local and regional sites that reflect her personal connections and the continued recognition of her work within specific communities.

A memorial to Willard was placed at Richardson Beach in Kingston on September 28, 1939, by the Kingston branch of the Woman's Christian Temperance Union.

In Berkeley, Willard Park (adjacent to the Willard Middle School) was dedicated to Frances Willard in 1982.

Frances Willard Avenue in Chico, California, is named in her honor. Willard had been a guest of John and Annie Bidwell, the town founders and fellow leaders in the prohibitionist movement. The avenue is adjacent to the Bidwell Mansion.

The Frances Willard House Museum and Archives is located in Evanston, Illinois.

=== Cultural representations ===
Willard appears as one of two main female protagonists in the young adult novel Bicycle Madness by Jane Kurtz, which situates her within a narrative exploration of women’s history and social change.

F.E.W. Spirits, a distillery located in Evanston, Illinois, derives its name from Frances Elizabeth Caroline Willard's initials .

== Relationships ==
The loves of women for each other grow more numerous each day, and I have pondered much why these things were. That so little should be said about them surprises me, for they are everywhere.... In these days when any capable and careful woman can honorably earn her own support, there is no village that has not its examples of 'two hearts in counsel,' both of which are feminine.
– Frances Willard, The Autobiography of an American Woman: Glimpses of Fifty Years, 1889

Contemporary accounts described Willard's friendships and her pattern of long-term domestic assistance from women. She formed the strongest friendships with co-workers. It is difficult to redefine Willard's 19th-century life in terms of the culture and norms of later centuries, but some scholars describe her inclinations and actions as aligned with same-sex emotional alliance (what historian Judith M. Bennett calls "lesbian-like").

One of Willard's close relationships with another woman was with her personal secretary, Anna Gordon, whom some scholars refer to as Willard's "lifelong companion." Willard and Gordon lived together for over a decade, and cared for Willard's mother.

== Controversy over civil rights issues ==
In the 1890s, Willard came into conflict with African-American journalist and anti-lynching crusader Ida B. Wells. While trying to expose the evils of alcohol, Willard and other temperance reformers often depicted one of the evils as its effect to incite purported black criminality, thus implying that this was one of the serious problems requiring an urgent cure. The rift first surfaced during Wells' speaking tour of Britain in 1893, where Willard was also touring and was already a popular reformist speaker. Wells openly questioned Willard's silence on lynching in the United States and accused Willard of having pandered to the racist myth that white women were in constant danger of rape from drunken black males to avoid endangering WCTU efforts in the South. She recounted a time when Willard had visited the South and blamed the failure of the temperance movement there on the population: "The colored race multiplies like the locusts of Egypt," and "the grog shop is its center of power.... The safety of women, of childhood, of the home is menaced in a thousand localities."

Willard repeatedly denied Wells' accusations and wrote that "the attitude of the society [WCTU] toward the barbarity of lynching has been more pronounced than that of any other association in the United States," and she maintained that her primary focus was upon empowering and protecting women, including the many African-American members of the WCTU. While it is true that neither Willard nor the WCTU had ever spoken out directly against lynching, the WCTU actively recruited black women and included them in its membership.

After their acrimonious exchange, Willard explicitly stated her opposition to lynching and successfully urged the WCTU to pass a resolution against lynching. She, however, continued to use the rhetoric that Wells alleged incited lynching. In her pamphlets Southern Horrors and The Red Record, Wells linked rhetoric portraying white women as symbols of innocence and purity that black men could not resist, as facilitating lynchings.

Wells also believed that Willard condoned segregation by permitting the practice within WCTU's southern chapters. Under Willard's presidency, the national WCTU maintained a policy of "states rights" which allowed southern charters to be more conservative than their northern counterparts regarding questions of race and the role of women in politics.

== Publications ==
- Woman and Temperance, or the Work and Workers of the Woman's Christian Temperance Union. Hartford, Conn: Park Pub. Co., 1883.
- How to Win: A Book For Girls. NY: Funk & Wagnalls, 1886. reprinted 1887 & 1888.
- Nineteen Beautiful Years, or, Sketches of a Girl's Life. Chicago: Woman's Temperance Publication Association, 1886.
- Glimpses of Fifty Years: the Autobiography of an American Woman. Chicago: Woman's Temperance Publishing Association, 1889.
- A Classic Town: The Story of Evanston. Woman's Temperance Publishing Association, Chicago, 1891.
- President's Annual Address. 1891, Woman's Christian Temperance Union.
- A Woman of the Century (1893) (ed. Willard, Frances E. & Livermore, Mary A.) - available online at Wikisource.
- A Wheel Within a Wheel. How I Learned to Ride the Bicycle. 1895.
- Do Everything: a Handbook for the World's White Ribboners. Chicago: Woman's Temperance Publishing Association, [1895?].
- Occupations for Women. Cooper Union, NY: Success Company. 1897.

== See also ==
- List of civil rights leaders
- List of suffragists and suffragettes
- List of women's rights activists
- Timeline of women's suffrage
- Descendants of Simon Willard

== Sources ==
=== References ===
- Baker, Jean H. Sisters: The Lives of America's Suffragists Hill and Wang, New York, 2005 ISBN 0-8090-9528-9.
- Gordon, Anna Adams The Beautiful Life of Frances E. Willard, Chicago, 1898
- McCorkindale, Isabel Frances E. Willard centenary book (Adelaide, 1939) Woman's Christian Temperance Union of Australia, 2nd ed.
- Strachey, Ray Frances Willard, her life and work - with an introduction by Lady Henry Somerset, New York, Fleming H. Revell (1913)

=== Further reading ===
- Dillon, Mary Earhart (1979). "Willard, Frances Elizabeth Caroline". In James, Edward T. (ed.). Notable American Women: 1607–1950. Cambridge, Massachusetts: Harvard University Press. ISBN 0674627318.
- Anna Adams Gordon, The beautiful life of Frances Elizabeth Willard, 1898 Book online
- William M. Thayer, Women who win, 1896 s. 341–369 (355–383) Book online

=== Primary sources ===
- Let Something Good Be Said: Speeches and Writings of Frances E. Willard, ed. by Carolyn De Swarte Gifford and Amy R. Slagell, University of Illinois Press, 2007 ISBN 978-0-252-03207-3.
- Correspondence and images of Frances Willard from Kansas Memory, the digital portal of the Kansas historical Society.
