= Mary Willard =

Mary Willard may refer to:

- Mary Bannister Willard (1841–1912), American editor, temperance worker, and educator
- Mary Louisa Willard (1898–1993), American forensic scientist
- Mary Thompson Hill Willard (1805–1892), American teacher and social reformer
- Patsy Willard (Mary Patricia Willard) (born 1941), American former diver
