= Illinois Industrial School for Girls =

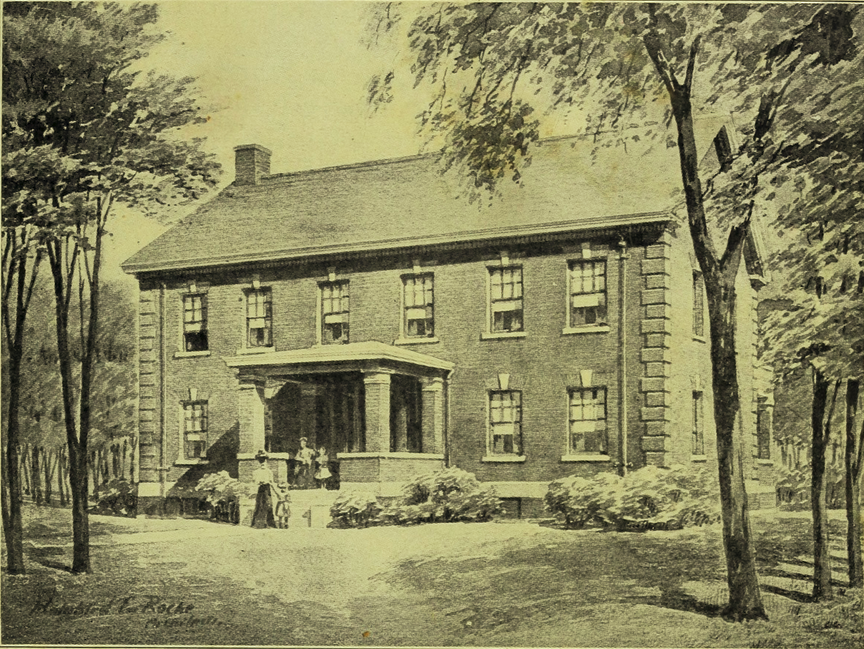
Illinois Industrial School for Girls (Park Ridge, 1909)

The Illinois Industrial School for Girls (later, Park Ridge School for Girls; now Park Ridge Youth Campus) traced its foundation to 1877, in South Evanston, Illinois. The organization received its charter on January 9 and opened on November 1 in a building formerly used as a soldiers' home, with 5 acres (2.0 ha) of land. It was the first such school for girls in Illinois. In 1879, Illinois General Assembly passed a general law to allow industrial schools for girls, and on October 1, 1879, the school reorganized with a corporate charter under the new law. An 1882 lawsuit challenged the constitutionality of such schools in Illinois, but the court ruled in favor of the school's existence, judging it to be "of the same character" as the power of parens patriae already in the common law, and that the school was not a prison and committing a child to the school was not imprisonment.

The Record and Appeal, the organ of the school, was established in 1884. It recorded the work of the home and appealed for sympathy and help. Mary Crowell Van Benschoten, a trustee for fifteen years, served as editor for eight years.

After some complaints of mismanagement in 1894 and 1895, Illinois governor John Peter Altgeld attempted to discharge all 105 girls, but they refused to leave.

As early as 1903, there were calls to move and reorganize the school on the "cottage plan": for example by a T.H. MacQuerary, of the Chicago Parental School, in the American Journal of Sociology.

In 1906, a scandal over placement of some girls into poor homes, and the mismanagement of money, caused a change in leadership. After the directors were reorganized, Jane Addams served on the school's board of directors.

In early 1907, the Board of Directors announced that they planned to leave Evanston and relocate to a new rural location in Park Ridge. With 125 girls and mounting financial difficulties, the school arranged for a charity baseball game that included a semi-professional team run by Cap Anson to be played at West Side Park.

The facility was relocated to Park Ridge, Illinois in 1908, and renamed the Park Ridge School for Girls in 1913.
