= Elizabeth Boynton Harbert =

American author, lecturer, reformer and philanthropist

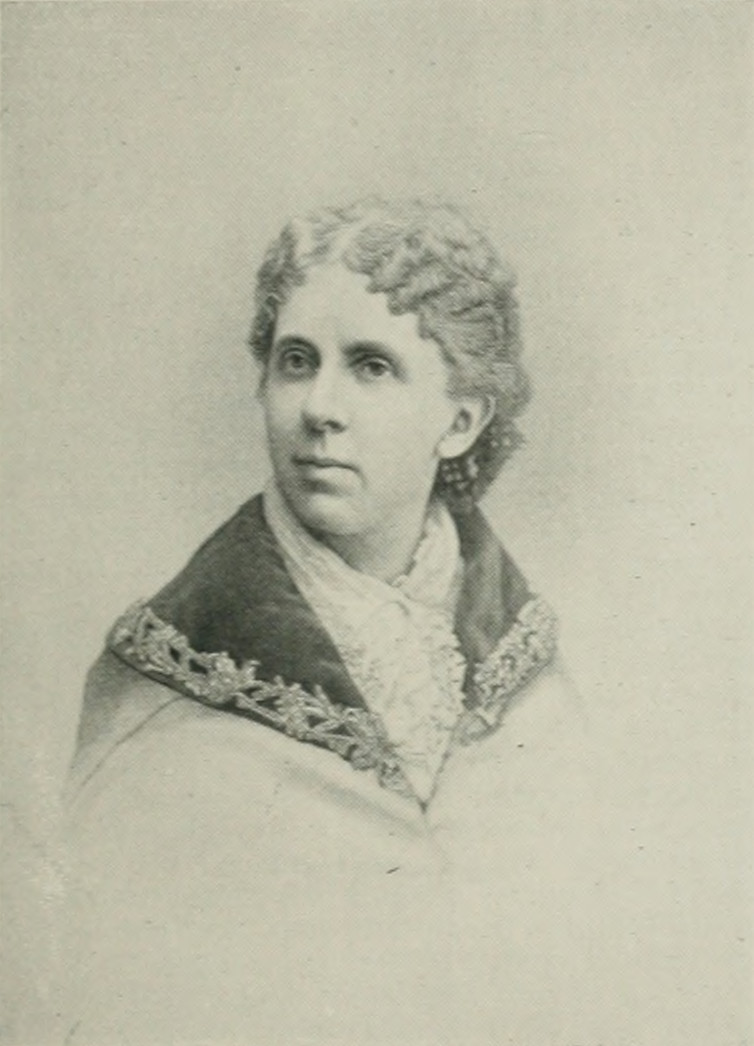
- Photo in A Woman of the Century
- Born: Elizabeth Morrison Boynton; April 15, 1843/1845; Crawfordsville, Indiana, U.S.
- Died: January 19, 1925 (aged 79 or 81); Pasadena, California, U.S.
- Other name: "Lizzie"
- Citizenship: United States
- Education: Oxford Female College
- Alma mater: Ohio Wesleyan University
- Occupations: Author, lecturer, reformer, philanthropist
- Spouse: William S. Harbert
- Writing career
- Pen name: Lizzie M. Boynton

Elizabeth Morrison Harbert (née Boynton; pen name, Lizzie M. Boynton; April 15, 1843/1845 - January 19, 1925) was a 19th-century American author, lecturer, reformer and philanthropist from Indiana. She was the first woman to design a woman's plank and secure its adoption by a major political party in a U.S. state.

Harbert was a prolific writer, with publications such as The Golden Fleece, Out of Her Sphere, Amore, and The Illinois Chapter in the History of Woman Suffrage. Her songs included: “Arlington Heights”, “What Have You Done with the Hours?”, “The New America” (lyrics), and “The Promised Land” (lyrics). Her poems included “The Little Earth Angel” and Lines to My Anonymous Friend”. Harbart's essays and lecturers were on topics such as “Before Suffrage, What?”, “Homes of Representative Women”, “The Domestic Problem”, “Men's Rights”, “Conversation and Conversers”, “The Ideal Home”, “George Eliot”, “Lucretia Mott”, “Statesmanship of Women”, “Aims, Ideals and Methods of Women’s Clubs”, “A Woman’s Dream of Cooperation”, “The Message of the Madonna", “Lyric Poets of Russia”, and “An Hour with the Strong Minded.”

== Early life and education ==
Elizabeth Morrison Boynton was born in Crawfordsville, Indiana on April 15, 1843 (or 1845). She was a daughter of William H. Boynton, formerly of Nashua, New Hampshire. Her mother was Abigail Sweetser, a native of Boston.

Harbert was educated in the women's seminary in Oxford, Ohio and in the Terre Haute Female College, graduating from the latter institution with honors in 1862.

The faculty of Wabash College allowed Harbert and three other young women to attend physics lectures taught by Prof. John Lyle Campbell. Although these lectures were substantially repetitions of those required in the college curriculum, the young men were excluded from attending the lectures being provided to the four women. Before he died, Dr. Charles White, President of Wabash College, promised Harbert a diploma upon the completion of her course of study. Not long after, the same four women, and 19 others, petitioned the faculty for permission to be admitted to the college. The faculty responded with regrets, stating that the facilities were inadequate to admit women, although each of the 23 women had progressed far beyond the “preparatory” department. The first US$10.00 Harbert earned as a writer came from The New York Independent for an account of this attempt to obtain a college education.

This group of 23 women, under the leadership of the first four demonstrated their indignation and disappointment by creating a public library. For funding, they advertised the presentation of a comedy, entitled “The Coming Woman”, in which they burlesqued themselves and their unsuccessful efforts to gain admission to Wabash College. In a relentless manner, the male students issued burlesque handbills and posters. In one day, not less than five varieties were issued. The ladies were styled “the Twenty-three Sorry Sisses”, in an attempt to pun upon the word “Sorosis”, which latter organization was attracting considerable attention in the East. The adverse criticism attracted an unusually large audience, and with the considerable amount of money which was netted, they purchased the nucleus for a circulating library. Boynton was 20 years old at the time.

In 1891, Ohio Wesleyan College conferred upon Harbert the honorary degree of Doctor of Philosophy.

== Career ==
=== Indiana ===
During the American Civil War (1861–65), Harbert cared for Union soldiers. She published her first book, "The Golden Fleece," in 1867, and delivered her first lecture, in Crawfordsville, in 1869.

=== Iowa ===
In 1870, she married William Soesbe Harbert. After their marriage, they removed to Des Moines, Iowa, where Harbert published her second book, entitled "Out of Her Sphere", as well as her first song, “Arlington Heights”. Harbert took an active part in the woman suffrage movement. She convinced the Republican Party of Iowa to put into their State platform a woman's plank which prepared a platform based on Harbert's presentation. In this way, Harbert became the first woman to design a woman's plank and secure its adoption by a major political party in a U.S. state.

=== Illinois ===
In the winter of 1874, the Harberts removed to Evanston, Illinois. For two years, Harbert served as president of the Social Science Association of Illinois. She also served as vice-president of the Woman's Suffrage Association of Indiana, president of the Woman's Suffrage Association of Iowa, and for twelve years, president of the Illinois Woman's Suffrage Association. She was a member of the Board of Managers of the Girls' Industrial School of South Evanston, and vice-president of the Association for the Advancement of Women, known as the World's Congress of Representative Women.

As editor for seven years of the “Woman's Kingdom,” a regular weekly department of the Chicago Inter Ocean, Harbert exerted a widespread influence. For a year, she was also the editor of The New Era, an Illinois-based suffrage newspaper. Her third book, "Amore", went to press in 1892.

Harbert was involved in the cause of woman suffrage and was also interested in philanthropic and charitable enterprises. During the year of the World's Columbian Exposition (1893), and the World's Congress, which was popularly known as the World's Parliament of Religions, Harbert served on several committees, including the Committee of the Woman's Branch of the World's Congress Auxiliary on Government Reform Congresses, and subsequently became Associate Chairman of the Government Reform Congress of the World's Congresses. Harbert and Charles C. Bonney served as Associate Chairs of the World's Unity League.

After the death of Bonney, Harbert became the acting chair. Herbert was a charter member of the Illinois Woman's Press Association, a member of the Illinois Press Association, president and director of the National Household Economic Association, and vicepresident for Illinois of the National Woman Suffrage Association. The Woman's Club of Evanston was organized and presided over by Harbert.

On two occasions, Harbert addressed the Judiciary Committee of the U.S. Senate, making a plea for an amendment to the Federal Constitution prohibiting the disfranchisement of US citizens on account of sex. She also addressed the New York State Assembly at a joint session of the Assembly and Senate of that State, upon the same subject. With Catherine Waugh McCulloch, of Evanston, and Helen M. Gougar, of Lafayette, Indiana, Harbert went to Springfield, Illinois, where they addressed the House and Senate in favor of the bill allowing the women of Illinois to vote upon school questions, and secured the passage of the bill.

She made addresses before the Legislative Assemblies of Wisconsin, Iowa and Illinois. She was one of the two women appointed by the National Woman's Suffrage Committee, as delegates from the US at large to the National Republican Convention that nominated Rutherford B. Hayes, at which she made an address before the platform committee.

== Personal life ==
There were three children in the family: a son, Arthur Boynton Harbert (1861–1890), and two daughters, Corinne Boynton Harbert (born 1873) and Boynton Elizabeth Harbert (born 1875). Besides the Evanston home, the Harberts had a cottage in Lake Geneva, Wisconsin, which they frequented in the summers when they lived in Illinois. In later life, the Harberts relocated to California where she served as vice-president of the Women's Civic League of Pasadena; vice-president of the Southern California Women's Press League; and was a member of the Church of the Golden Rule, a Universalist parish in Pasadena.

== Death and legacy ==
On January 19, 1925, Harbert died in Pasadena, California.

Her papers are held in the Arthur and Elizabeth Schlesinger Library on the History of Women in America, Radcliffe Institute for Advanced Study, at Harvard University, and her correspondence with Susan B. Anthony is held by the Huntington Library, in San Marino, California.

== Selected works ==
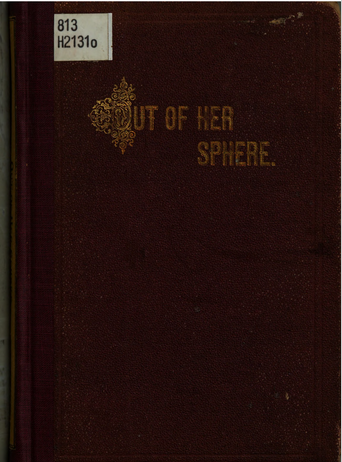
Out of Her Sphere

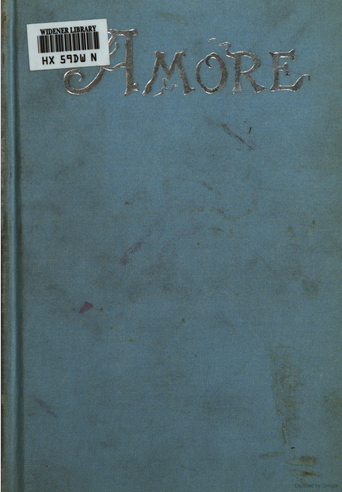
Amore

- 1871, Out of her sphere
- 1883, The new America
- 1892, Amore
