= William Soesbe Harbert =

American lawyer

William Soesbe Harbert (September 17, 1842 – March 24, 1919) was an American lawyer, judge, social activist, philanthropist, and Civil War soldier. He enlisted in the 85th Indiana Regiment at the beginning of the American Civil War where he established himself as an officer. His official enlistment date was on August 14, 1862, at the rank of Sergeant and he left in July 1865 at the rank of Lieutenant. Harbert originally attended law school in Bloomington, Indiana but later received his law degree from the University of Michigan. He practiced law in Des Moines, Iowa from 1867–1872 until he moved to Chicago to head the law office of Harbert & Daley.

== Early years and education ==
Harbert was born September 17, 1842, at Terre Haute, Indiana, the son of Solomon and Amadine (Watson) Harbert—the former a descendant of a Virginian family of English ancestry, and the latter a native of Bardstown, Kentucky. At an early age, Harbert attended the public schools of Terre Haute, preparatory to a course in Franklin College, at Franklin, Indiana. From that institution, he went to Wabash College, Crawfordsville, Indiana, and from there to the University of Michigan, where he remained till he completed his sophomore year. In 1862, he enlisted as a volunteer in the Union Army, and on his return from the field, matriculated in the Law Department of Indiana University Bloomington remaining there one year, when he entered the Law Department of the University of Michigan, at Ann Arbor, where he received his degree in 1867.

== Career ==
Also in 1867, he located at Des Moines, Iowa; was admitted to the bar, remaining there seven years. During that time, he served as Assistant United States District Attorney, and being also a member of the law firm of Harbert & Clark. He removed to Chicago in 1874, where he resumed practice as the senior member of the firm of Harbert & Daly. This partnership was succeeded by that of Harbert, Curran & Harbert, the junior partner being his only son, Arthur Boynton Harbert. Upon the death of his son, in 1900, the firm was dissolved, and Harbert practiced alone.

The year following the outbreak of the Civil War and while a student, then 20 years of age, Harbert enlisted as a private in Company C Eighty-fifth Indiana Volunteers and was in active service until 1865. During the period of his military career, he served on the staff of Gen. John Colburn, Gen. Benjamin Harrison, and Major-General W. T. Ward. He was engaged in the campaigns against Atlanta and Savannah and was with General Sherman on his march to the sea. At the first battle of Franklin, Tennessee, he was taken prisoner and spent two months in Libby Prison. He was brevetted as Captain "for distinguished meritorious services." Harbert was prominent in philanthropic work and, for seven years, was president of the Board of Managers of the "Forward Movement," a social settlement organization. He holds membership in and was active in furthering the enterprises of a number of philanthropic organizations.

== Personal life ==
In his religious and political affiliations. Harbert was independent. He believed in municipal control of public utilities, assisted in the establishment of the Juvenile Court, the adoption of the indeterminate sentence law, and advocated the placing of a limitation on the power to grant, by will, large sums to single individuals.

On October 18, 1870, Harbert married Elizabeth Morrison Boynton, an author, lecturer, reformer and philanthropist. There were three children from the union, Arthur Boynton, Corinne Boynton, and Boynton Elizabeth. Harbert died in Pasadena, California on March 24, 1919.
