= Helen Farnsworth Mears =

American sculptor (1872–1916)

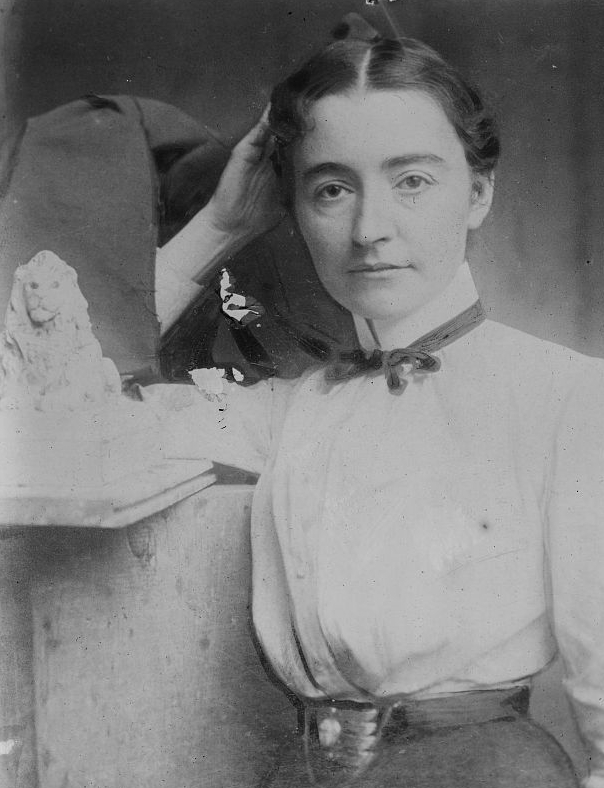
- Helen Farnsworth Mears
- Born: December 21, 1872; Oshkosh, Wisconsin, U.S.
- Died: February 17, 1916 (aged 43); Greenwich Village, New York
- Education: State Normal School in Oshkosh
- Known for: Sculpture
- Notable work: marble statue of Frances E. Willard
- Movement: "White Rabbits"
- Patrons: Augustus Saint Gaudens

Helen Farnsworth Mears (/mɪərs/; December 21, 1872 – February 17, 1916) was an American sculptor.

== Early years ==
Mears was born December 21, 1872, in Oshkosh, Wisconsin. She was the youngest daughter of John Hall Mears and Elizabeth Farnsworth Mears, a poet who wrote under the pen names "Nellie Wildwood" and "Ianthe," who was called the first Wisconsin woman poet. Mears's sisters were illustrator Louise Mears Fargo and writer Mary Mears.

Mears studied at the State Normal School in Oshkosh, and art in New York City. In New York, she studied under Augustus Saint Gaudens for two years and worked as his assistant before heading to Paris in 1895 to continue working with Denys Puech (sometimes Puesch), Alexandre Charpentier, and Frederick MacMonnies.

== Career ==
Her first success, before any formal art training, was "Genius of Wisconsin", a work commissioned by the State of Wisconsin when she was just 21. The work was exhibited in the Wisconsin Building at the World's Columbian Exposition in 1893. The 9-foot (2.7 m) marble sculpture was executed by the Piccirilli Brothers. It is now housed in the Wisconsin State Capitol. Both she and sculptor Jean Pond Miner were named "artists in residence" at the Wisconsin Building, and that is where she created The Genius of Wisconsin, while Miner produced Forward.

Mears was one of a group of women sculptors christened the "White Rabbits" who worked under Lorado Taft producing sculpture for the World Columbian Exposition.

In 1907, Mears and her sister, writer Mary Mears, were among the first artists in residence at MacDowell Colony.

=== Important works ===
Her most important works include a marble statue of Frances E. Willard (1905, Capitol, Washington) that is included in the National Statuary Hall Collection; portrait reliefs of Edward MacDowell (Metropolitan Museum, New York); and Augustus St. Gaudens; portrait busts of George Rogers Clark and William T.G. Morton, M. D. (Smithsonian Institution, Washington). In 1904, her "Fountain of Life" (St. Louis Exposition) won a bronze medal. She made New York her residence and exhibited there and in Chicago.

=== Statue of Wisconsin ===
In 1910, George B. Post, the architect of the Wisconsin State Capitol then being designed, attempted to secure the services of the well-known sculptor Daniel Chester French to create a statue of Wisconsin to be placed on top of the dome. French, having as much work as he desired, turned the commission down, and Post recommended Mears for the job. With the belief that she had the contract, she began working on a model; she ultimately created three models, with two of them receiving feedback from the commission.

By August 1911, Post suggested that Mears could not complete the design in their time frame, and the commission ultimately selected French to complete the sculpture. Mears was paid $1,500 for the work that she had already done, but the loss of the commission was a shock from which she never recovered.

== Death ==
Following the debacle surrounding the Wisconsin Capitol statue, Mears's health declined, as did her financial well-being. She died of heart disease on February 17, 1916, at the age of 43. At the time of her death, she was working in her studio at 46 Washington Square South, in Greenwich Village.

== Gallery ==
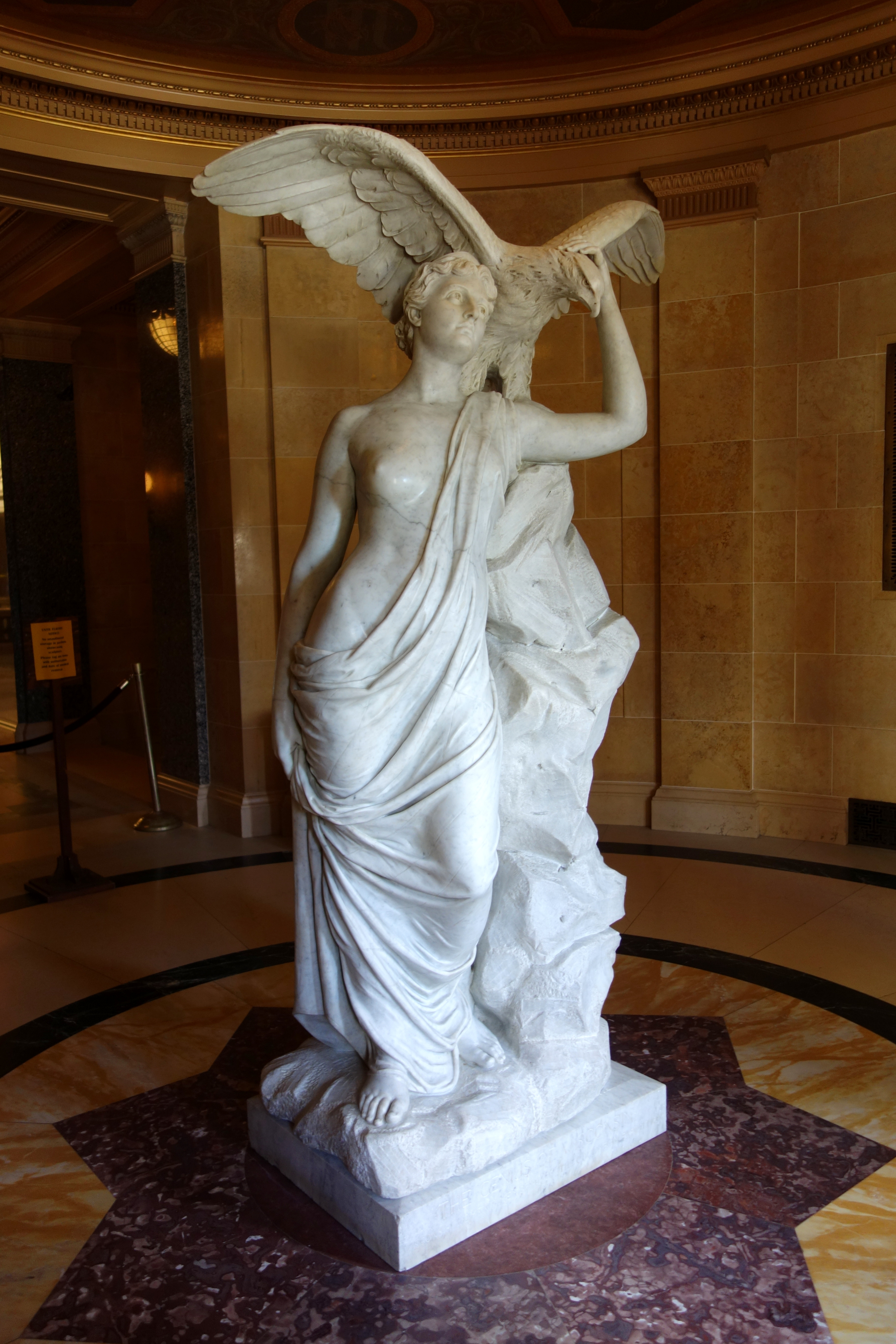
Genius of Wisconsin Helen Farnsworth Mears

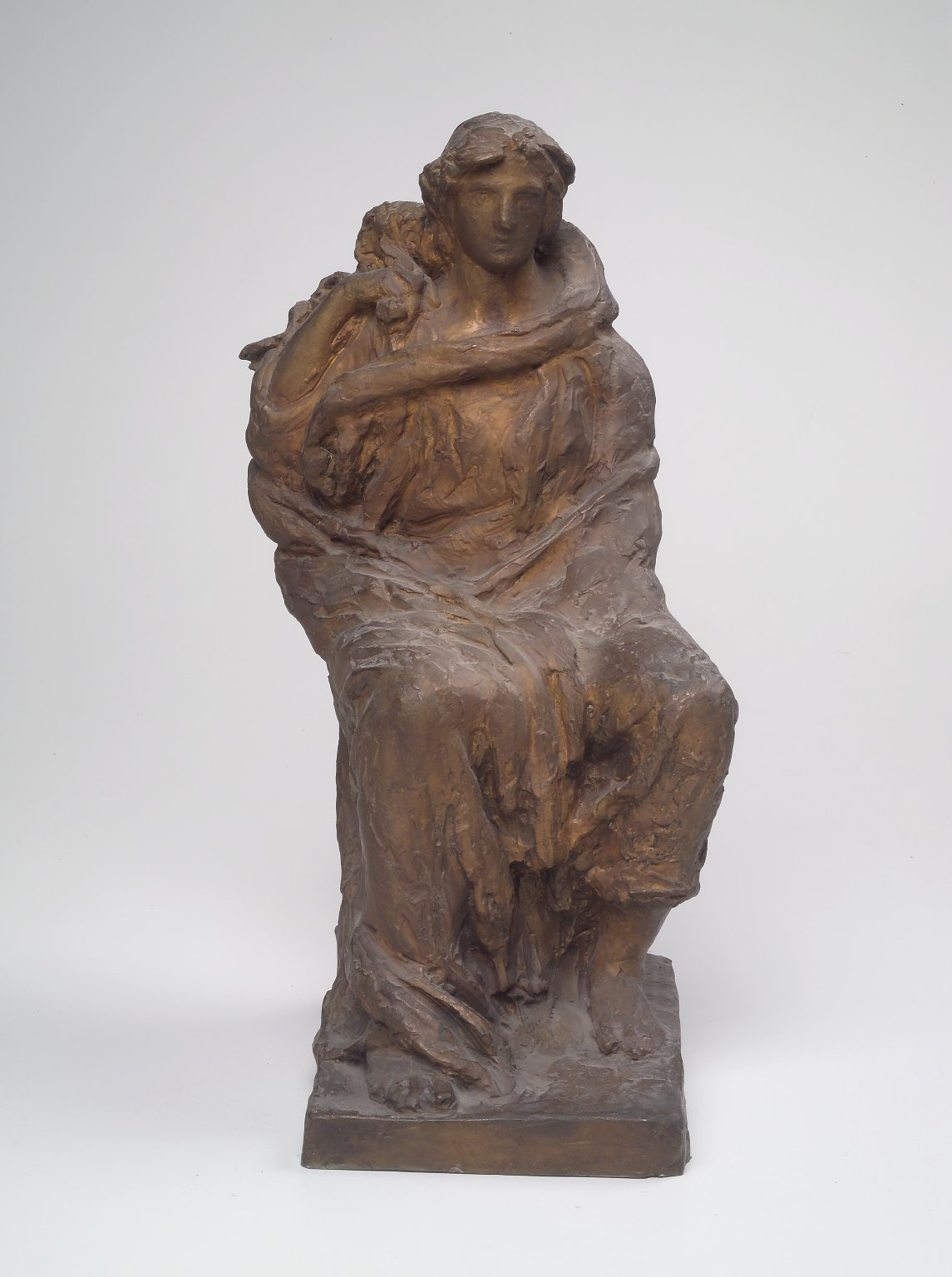
Death Uncovering Its Face and Showing It To Be Life by Helen Farnsworth Mears, 1916

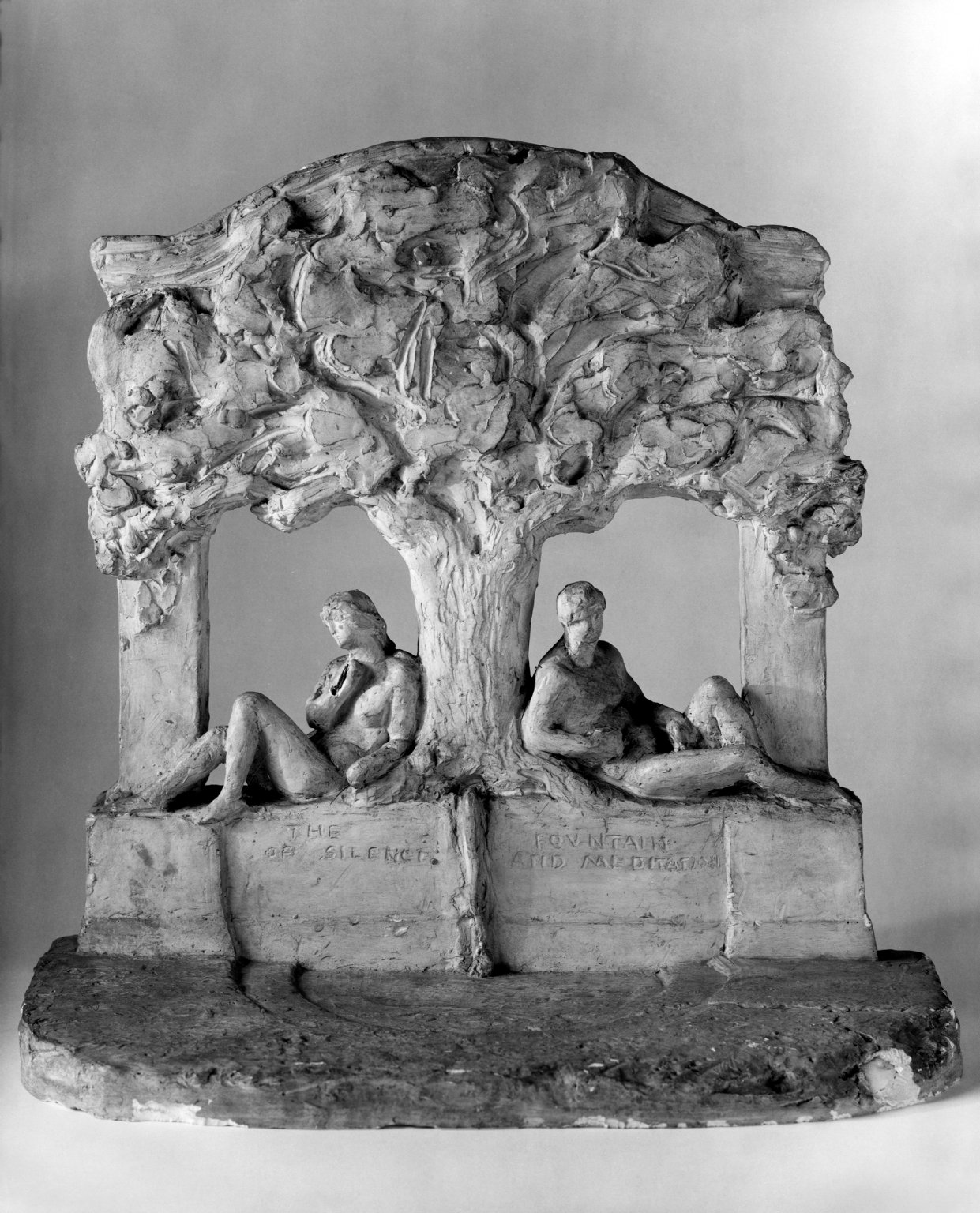
Sketch for Fountain of Silence and Meditation by Helen Farnsworth Mears, 1915

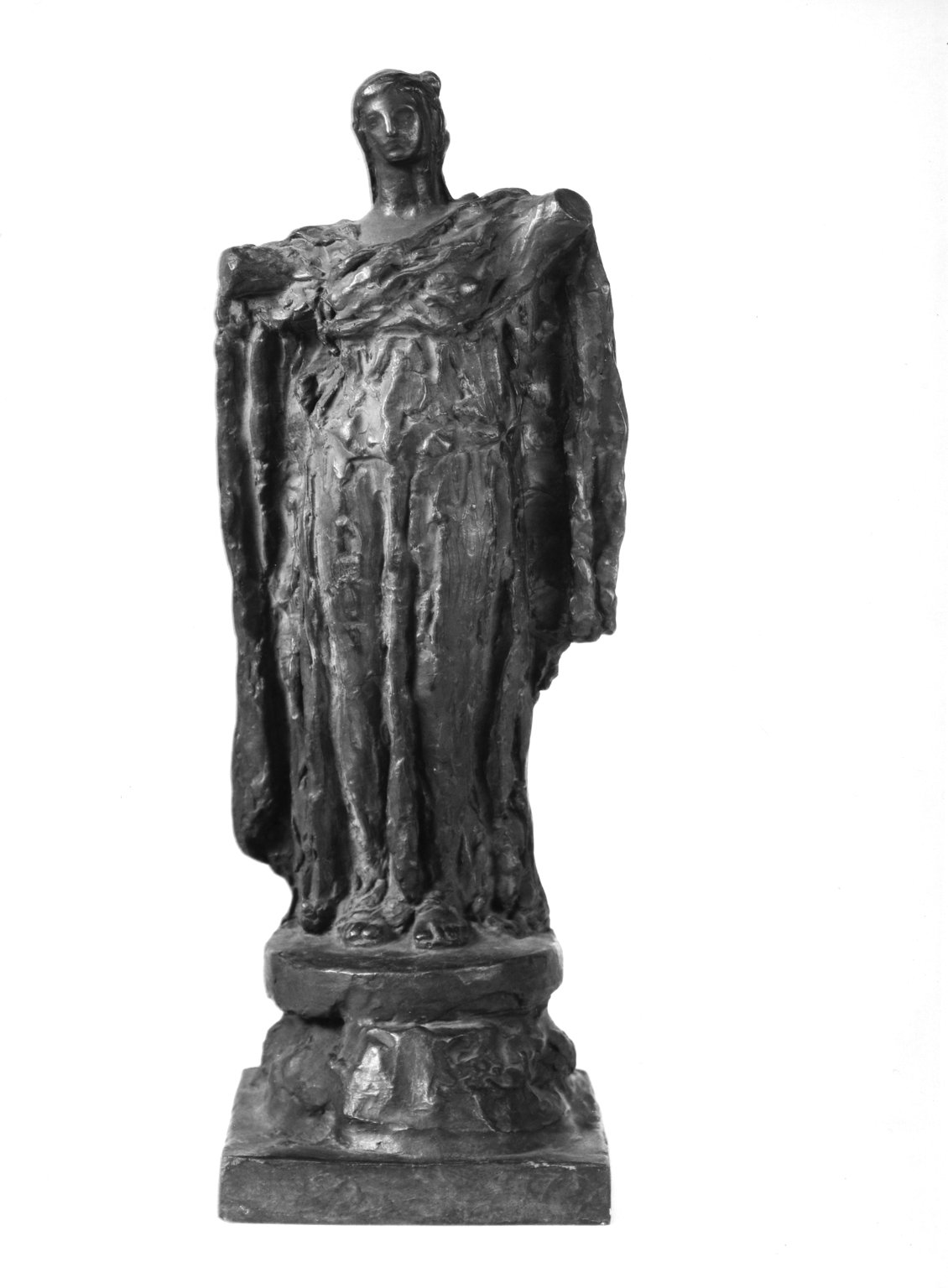
Armless Angel by Helen Farnsworth Mears, 1916

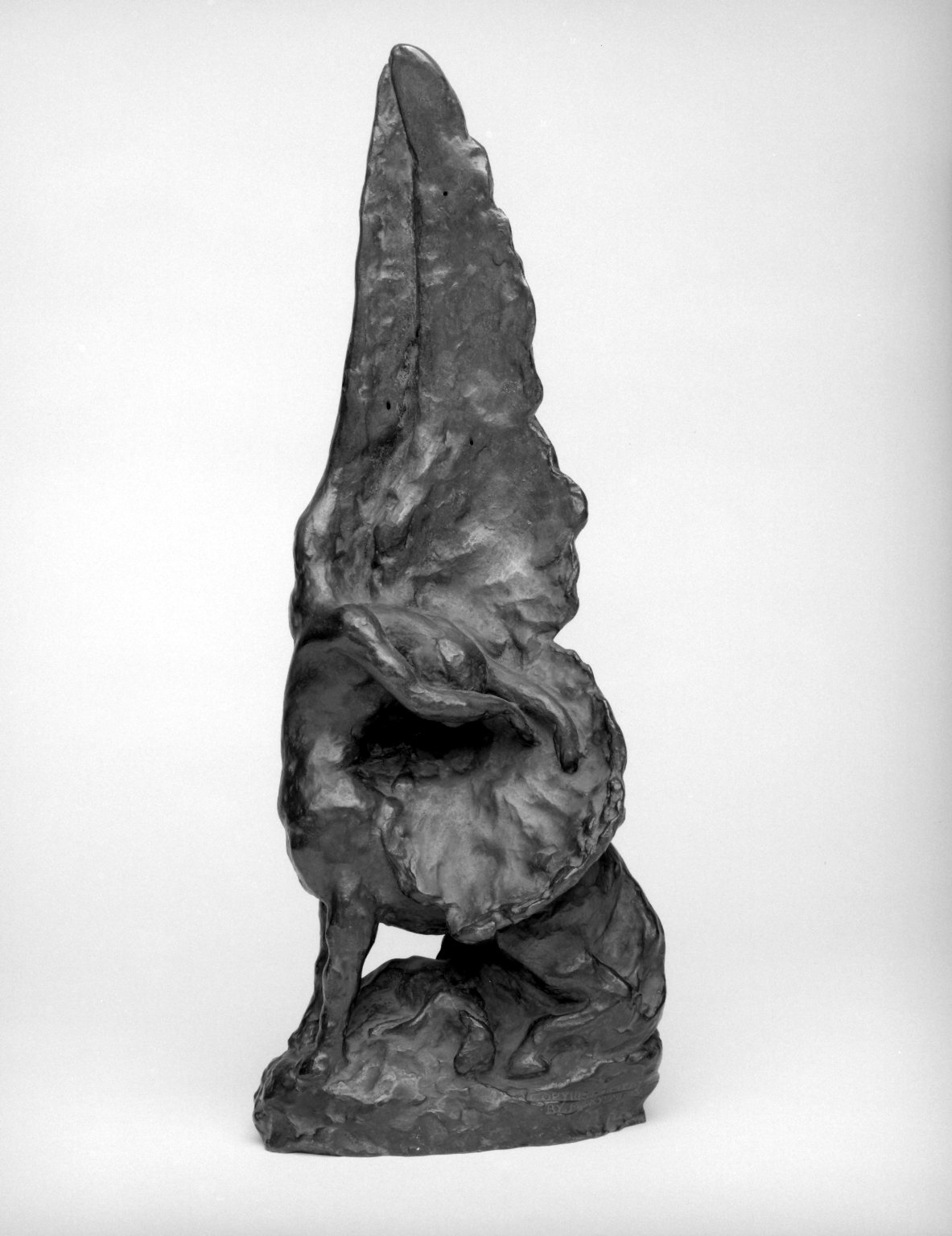
The Awakening by Helen Farnsworth Mears, 1916

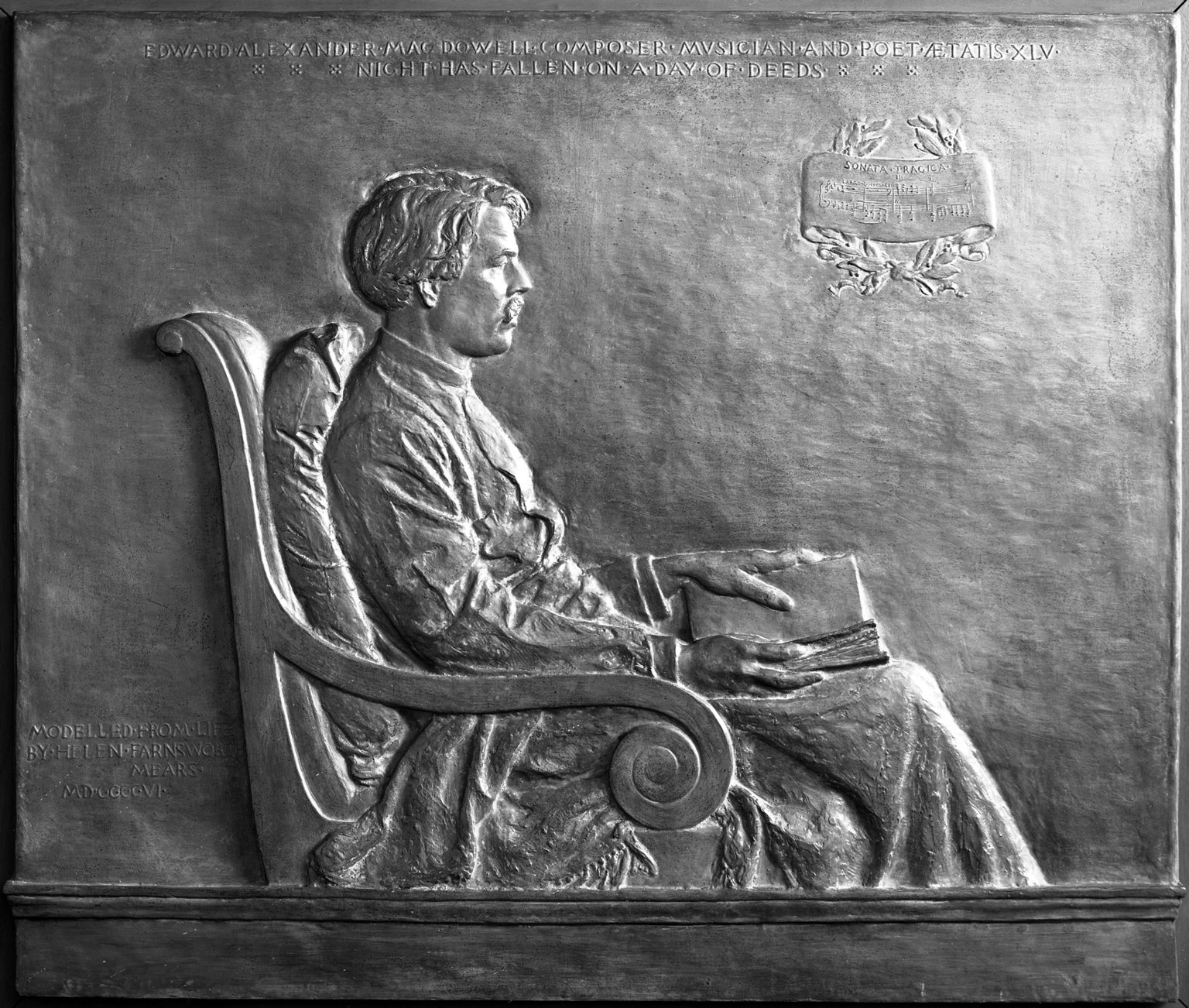
Edward Alexander MacDowell by Helen Farnsworth Mears, 1906
