= Mary Mears =

- Born: 2 January 1870; Oshkosh, Wisconsin, U.S.
- Died: 23 November 1943 (aged 73); Boston, Massachusetts, U.S.
- Relatives: Helen Farnsworth Mears (sister)

Mary Martha Mears (2 January 1870 - 23 November 1943) was an American fiction writer, screenwriter, and photographer. Her short stories appeared in Harper's, Forum, and McClure's. Mears published her first of four novels in 1896.

== Early life ==
Born in Oshkosh, Wisconsin, Mears was the daughter of Elizabeth Farnsworth Mears and John Hall Mears. Her mother was an early Wisconsin poet who published under the pen name Nellie Wildwood. Her sisters were sculptor Helen Farnsworth Mears and illustrator Louise Mears Fargo.

Mears and her sisters attended Oshkosh public schools. She was a graduate of the Oshkosh Normal school.

Mears wrote her first novel, Emma Lou: Her Book, between the ages of fourteen and seventeen and sold the novel to Henry Holt. The novel was published in 1896, when Mears was 26 years old.

Mears died in Boston at the age of 73.

== Career ==
In 1900, Mears moved to New York and set up an art studio, residing with her sister Helen.

In 1907, Mears and her sister Helen were among the first Fellows at the MacDowell artists' residency. Mears would go on to complete four additional residencies at MacDowell. She worked out of Bark Studio, later renamed the Schelling studio in 1933 after composer Ernest Schelling.

After Helen's sudden death on 17 February 1916, Mears became an ardent promoter of her sister's work until her own death in 1943. She gifted numerous pieces to museums, including the Brooklyn Museum. Mears photographed many of Helen's sculptures with a large format camera, creating many surviving records of her sister's work.

Mears was a frequent contributor to The Christian Science Monitor.

== Bibliography ==
=== Novels ===
- Emma Lou: Her Book (Holt, 1896)
- The Breath of Runners (Frederick A. Stokes Company, 1906)
- The Bird in the Box (Frederick A. Stokes Company, 1910)
- Rosamond the Second: Being the True Record of the Unparalleled Romance of One Claudius Fuller (Frederick A. Stokes Company, 1910)

=== Short stories (selected) ===
- "A realized romance" - Harper's (1897)
- "The marrying of Esther" - Harper's (1897)
- “Across the bridges” - Harper's (1900)

=== Plays ===
- Wings and the Woman

== Filmography ==
- The Forbidden Thing (silent film) (1920)
