= Mary Crowell Van Benschoten =

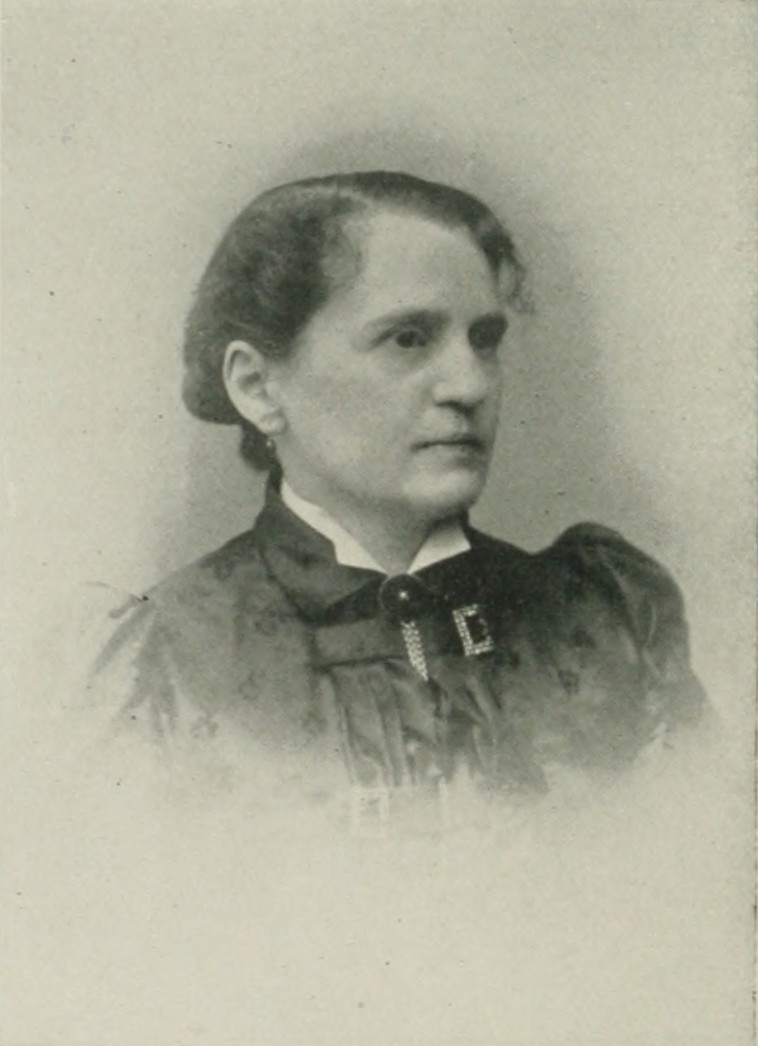
- Photo in A Woman of the Century
- Born: Mary Crowell; November 18, 1840; Brooklyn, New York, U.S.
- Died: March 29, 1921 (aged 80); Chicago, Illinois, U.S.
- Occupations: author; clubwoman; newspaper publisher
- Spouse: Samuel Van Benschoten
- Children: 2

Mary Crowell Van Benschoten (née, Crowell; November 18, 1840 – March 29, 1921) was an American author and clubwoman. She contributed to various papers and published a paper herself at one time. She was a charter member of the Illinois Woman's Press Association.

== Early life and education ==
Mary Crowell was born in Brooklyn, New York, November 18, 1840. Her parents were William Whitney Crowell and Elizabeth (Owens) Crowell. William's father was John Crowell of Brunswick, Maine, and his grandfather, Thomas Crowell, was an instructor in Bowdoin College.

She was educated in Brooklyn and New York City. In youth, she displayed dramatic and elocutionary talents, and gave many entertaining shows which aided charities.

== Career ==
She began to publish poems and short stories in her early life. She contributed to the Chicago Times, Chicago Tribune, Chicago Inter Ocean, and other journals. She served as a correspondent for the Brooklyn Argus. She was Frances Willard's first secretary.

She was one of the charter members of the Illinois Social Science Association, a charter member of the Woman's Club of Evanston, and one of the first secretaries of the Woman's Christian Temperance Union (WCTU). She was a member of the Illinois Press Association and of the Chicago Woman's Club. She served as one of the managers of the Chicago Woman's Exchange. She was trustee of the Illinois Industrial School for Girls (now Park Ridge Youth Campus) at South Evanston for fifteen years, and for eight years, she edited the organ of that school, The Record and Appeal. Established in 1884, the paper recorded the work of the home and appealed for sympathy and help.

== Personal life ==
At an early age, she married Samuel Van Benschoten, of New York City, and they removed to Evanston, Illinois in 1872 where Samuel became western representative for several eastern manufacturing houses. Their family consisted of two children, May (b. 1865) and William (b. 1870).

Mary Crowell Van Benschoten died March 29, 1921, at the Chicago residence of her son, William. She was 80 years old.
