= Woman's Club of Evanston =

- U.S. National Register of Historic Places
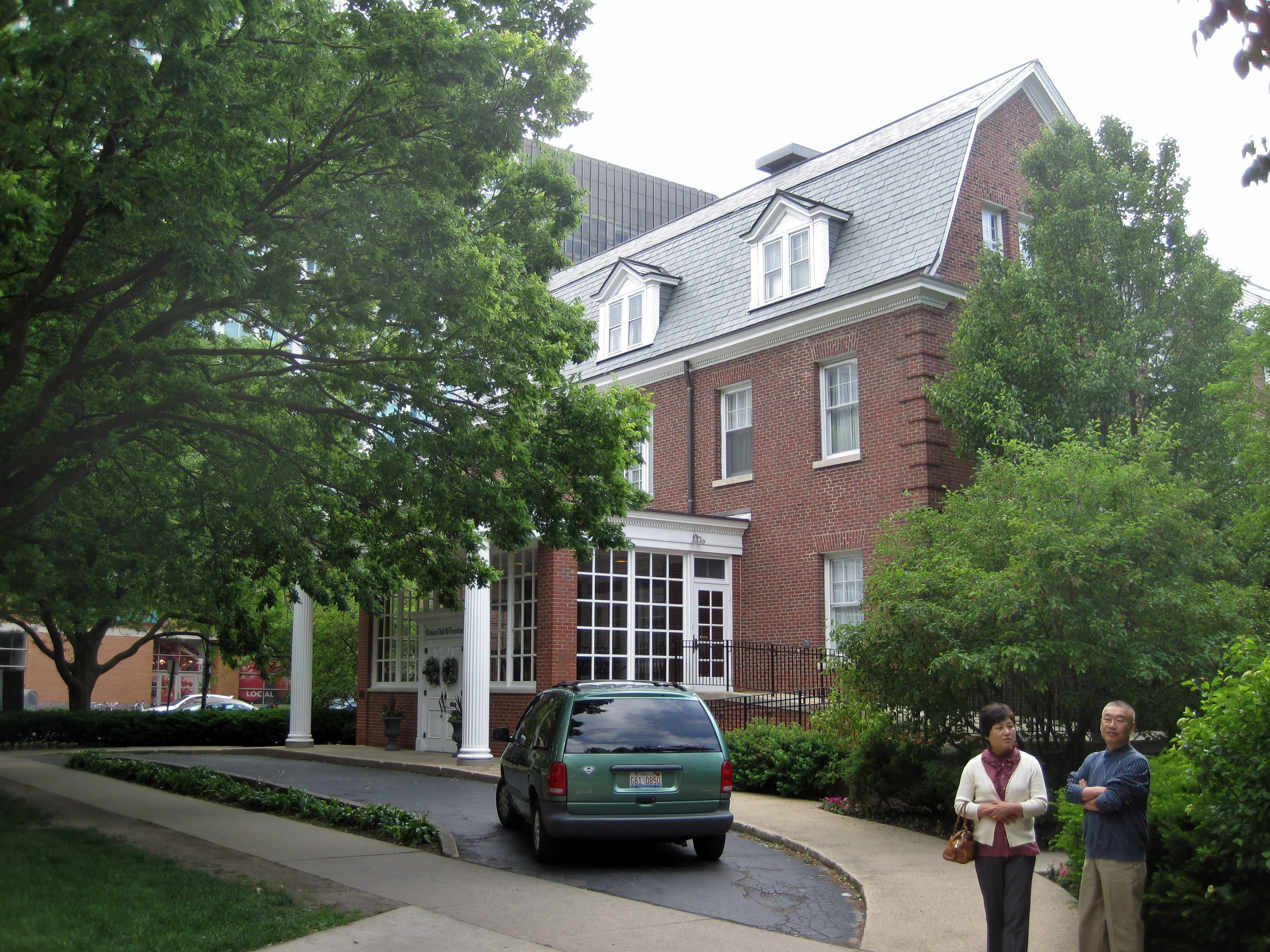

- Location within Illinois Location within the United States
- Location: 1702 Chicago Ave., Evanston, Illinois
- Coordinates: 42°2′52″N 87°40′42″W
- Area: less than one acre
- Built: 1913
- Architect: Mayo, Ernest
- Architectural style: Colonial Revival
- NRHP reference No.: 06001020
- Added to NRHP: November 9, 2006

The Woman's Club of Evanston is a historic house in Evanston, Illinois and is the headquarters for the social club of the same name. It is located at 1702 Chicago Avenue. On November 9, 2006, the clubhouse was added to the National Register of Historic Places.

== Origins ==
=== Social club ===
The organization currently located at 1702 Chicago Avenue was founded on March 2, 1889 at the Judson Avenue home of Women's Suffrage movement leader Elizabeth Boynton Harbert. Originally an informal group, the club drafted an official constitution the following year, stating their purpose as: "To secure better homes, wiser motherhood, better laws, truer citizenship and a nobler womanhood by promoting the physical, social, mental, moral and spiritual development of its members." Three years later, this statement was revised and condensed to "Mutual helpfulness in all affairs of life, and united effort toward the higher development of humanity."

=== Current building ===
In February, 1910, under the supervision of Mrs. Avis Grant, a building committee was organized to oversee the construction of a new clubhouse, and in January, 1911, a lot at the corner of Church Street and Chicago Avenue was purchased. Architect Ernest A. Mayo was commissioned to create the building. Ground was broken that February and the cornerstone was laid on May 28, 1912. The completed building was unveiled in an open gala reception on March 11, 1913. To date it serves as the headquarters of the Woman's Club of Evanston.

== Architecture ==
The Woman's Club building is in the late 19th/early 20th century Revival style. Both the foundation and the walls are made of brick, while the roof is slate. Exterior window trim is white, and the Club features large glass windows on one side.

== History ==
From the beginning, the club has worked locally and around the Chicago metropolitan area to create change in causes such as Woman's Suffrage, child labor laws, public health, sanitation, and home management. By the turn of the century, the Club was organizing awareness and fundraising galas that were notable Evanston cultural and social events.

The club's first major project was to establish a hospital in Evanston. A series of epidemics including typhoid fever and smallpox in the 1880s and 1890s prompted the raising of $3,600 towards the creation of the Evanston Hospital. Since its founding, the Woman's Club of Evanston has promoted the advancement of public health. It helped organize the Visiting Nurse Association in 1897 and paid the salary of the first visiting nurse.

During World War I, the club entertained servicemen, sponsored Red Cross knitting and sewing groups and provided an ambulance for the Red Cross in France. After the war, their food conservation efforts were converted into support for the opening of a community kitchen.

Since its inception, the Woman's Club of Evanston has been involved in promoting culture and the arts, including the 1922 creation of an annual art exhibition in the Clubhouse for community artists.

For its 1989 centennial, the Woman's Club was recognized and honored in a program put on by Evanston Hospital, the Visiting Nurses Association, Girl Scouts of the USA, and Boy Scouts of America.

On November 9, 2006, the club's headquarters was added to the National Register of Historic Places.

== The club today ==
The club currently has over 350 members, and is active in volunteer work, community mobilization, and social bonding. In addition to its role as the meeting point for the club, the Clubhouse is a prominent location for events such as weddings, fundraisers, parties, Bar and Bat Mitzvahs, and community gatherings.

Today, their mission statement is phrased as: "Connecting women behind a shared purpose of volunteerism, social empowerment and community support."

== Notable people ==
- Mary Crowell Van Benschoten (1840-1921), charter member
