= Statue of Frances Willard =

Statue in the U.S. Capitol

Frances Willard
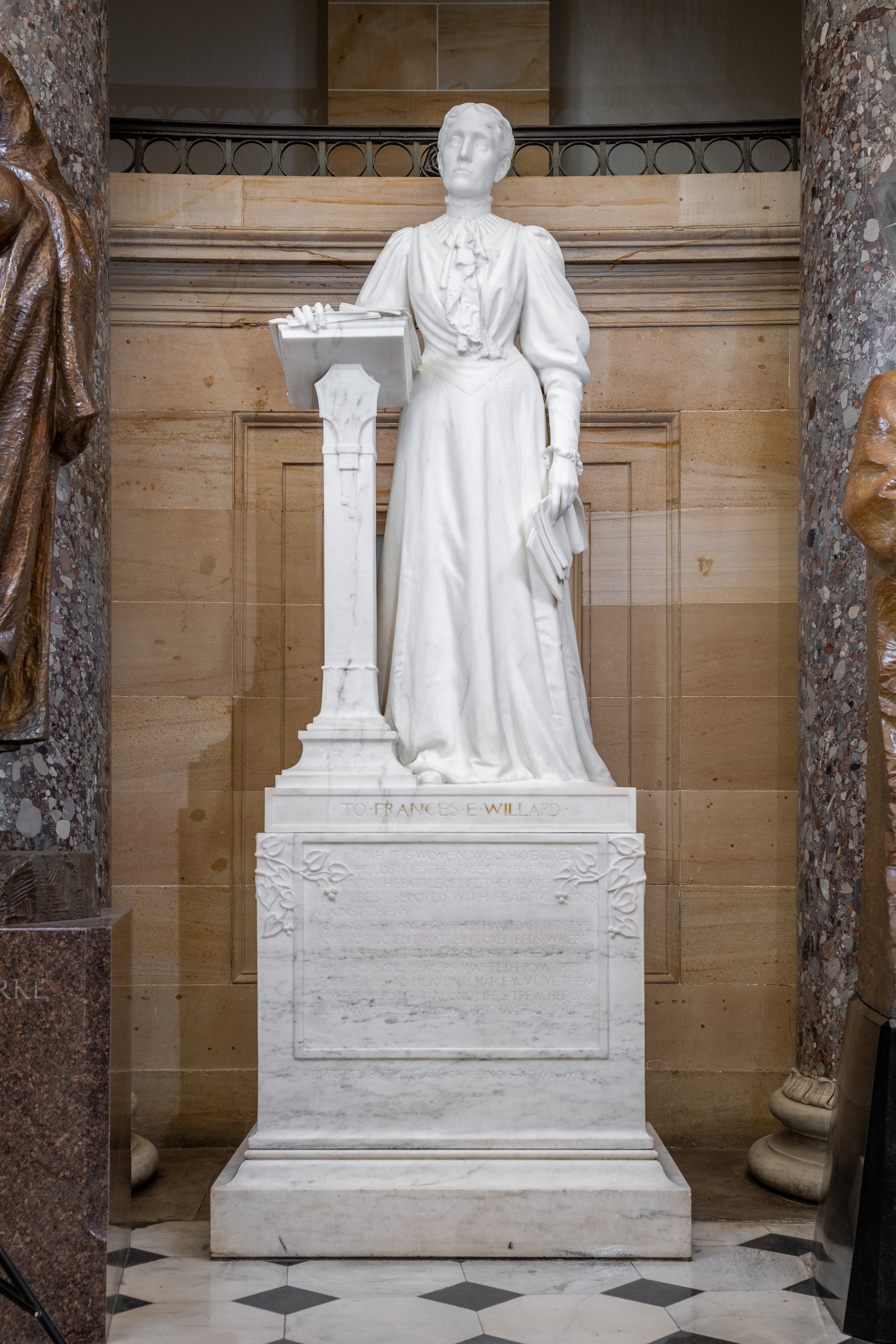
- The statue at the National Statuary Hall in 2023
- Artist: Helen Farnsworth Mears
- Subject: Frances Willard
- Location: Washington, D.C., United States

Frances E. Willard is a marble sculpture depicting the American educator, temperance reformer, and women's suffragist of the same name, created by Helen Farnsworth Mears and installed in the United States Capitol's National Statuary Hall, in Washington, D.C., as part of the National Statuary Hall Collection. The statue was given by the U.S. state of Illinois in 1905, making Willard the first woman to be honored in the collection.

== See also ==
- 1905 in art
