= Bicycle Madness =

2003 novel by Jane Kurtz

- A story about the importance of standing up for what is right.
- Author: Jane Kurtz
- Illustrator: Beth Peck
- Genre: Historical fiction
- Set in: 19th century
- Publisher: Henry Holt and Co. (BYR)
- Publication date: September 1st, 2003
- Pages: 122 pages
- ISBN: 080506981X
- OCLC: 51223514
- Website: http://www.goodreads.com/book/show/926187.Bicycle_Madness

Bicycle Madness is a young adult historical fiction novel by Jane Kurtz, with illustrations by Beth Peck. It involves real-life suffragist Frances Willard.
