= Elizabeth Farnsworth Mears =

Mary Elizabeth Farnsworth Mears (27 August 1827 - 15 November 1907) was an American poet and playwright, often credited as one of the first Wisconsin poets. Mears died in Lake Mills, Wisconsin on November 15, 1907. Her daughters were sculptor Helen Farnsworth Mears, the writer Mary Mears, and the illustrator Louise Mears Fargo.

Mears served as a subject for many of her daughter Helen's bas-relief sculptures. Her recollections of pioneer life in Illinois and Wisconsin were recorded by Publius V Lawson for The State Historical Society of Wisconsin.

== Early life ==
Mears was born in Groton, Massachusetts, the daughter of Mathias and Martha Farnsworth. The family moved to Fox River, Illinois, St. Charles, Illinois, and Fond du Lac, Wisconsin before settling in Oshkosh.

== Career ==
Mears began writing in 1860 under the names "Nellie Wildwood" and "Ianthe." Her play Black Hawk was performed for three weeks at the National Theater in Madison, debuting to a full house as it presented a favorable treatment of Sauk leader Black Hawk’s story.

Her sixty page long poem, Voyage of Pere Marquette, and Romance of Charles De Langlade, or, The Indian queen: An historical poem of the 17th and 18th centuries was published in 1860 by Harrison & Steven's Art Union in Fond du Lac. The work was long supposed to be the first volume of verse printed in Wisconsin and written by a resident of that state, though the record has since been challenged.

== Selected works ==
=== Poems ===
- "To the Storm Spirits"
- Voyage of Pere Marquette, and Romance of Charles De Langlade, or, The Indian queen: An historical poem of the 17th and 18th centuries (as Nellie Wildwood) (1860)

=== Plays ===
- Black Hawk, or Lily of the Prairie (as Nellie Wildwood)

=== Essays ===
- Recollections (1903) (with Publius Virgilius Lawson)
