= Frances Willard House =

Frances Willard House may refer to:

- Frances Willard House (Evanston, Illinois), a U.S. National Historic Landmark in Cook County, Illinois
- Frances Willard House (Chattanooga, Tennessee), listed on the National Register of Historic Places in Hamilton County, Tennessee

== See also ==
- Frances Willard Schoolhouse, Janesville, Wisconsin, listed on the NRHP in Wisconsin
