= Josiah Willard =

American politician

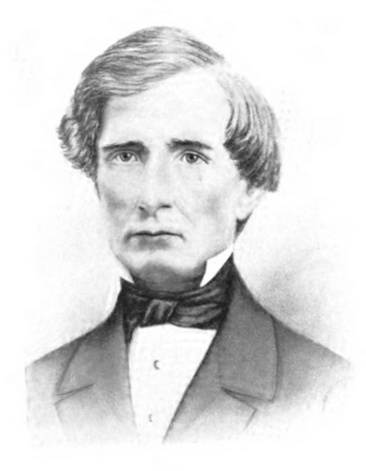
Josiah Willard

Josiah Flint Willard (November 17, 1805 - January 24, 1868) was an American dairy farmer, naturalist and businessman living in Janesville, Wisconsin, who served one term as a Free Soiler member of the Wisconsin State Assembly. He was the father of suffragist Frances E. Willard.

== Background ==
Willard was born in Wheelock, Vermont, on November 17, 1805. He originally moved to Oberlin, Ohio, to be part of the ministry there. He married Mary Thompson Hill, a schoolteacher. They lived in Churchville, near Rochester, New York, where their first son Oliver was born about 1834; a daughter, Caroline Elizabeth, died in 1838, and in 1839 came the birth of their daughter Frances Elizabeth Caroline. A third daughter, Mary, was born in 1843, and died in 1862.

In 1846, Josiah became ill. His doctor advised him to give up his theological studies and move to the open countryside. They moved to a 360-acre farm on a river in Janesville, in the Wisconsin Territory some few miles north of the Illinois border. During the family’s stay in Wisconsin, they would convert from Congregationalism to Methodism, a Protestant denomination that placed an emphasis on social justice and service to the world.

== Legislature and partisan politics ==
Willard was elected to the second session of the Wisconsin State Legislature, which convened January 10, 1849 and adjourned April 2 of that year, as one of five members from Rock County; he was the only one from Janesville. In the next session, the only Rock County State Representative from Janesville was William Tompkins, a Whig.

He was a delegate to the "Union Democratic Party" (also called the "Free Soil Democrats") convention which convened in Madison, Wisconsin on September 7, 1849. He was elected vice-president of the convention, and to the state central committee of that party.

== Farming and other business ==
In 1849, Willard was elected the first vice-president of the newly organized Wisconsin State Agricultural Society. In December 1851, Willard was elected president of the Rock County Agricultural Society.

Willard was credited with getting the Wisconsin School for the Blind sited in Janesville, and was on its board of trustees from 1851-1857.

In 1853, Willard and his neighbor built what is now known as the Frances Willard Schoolhouse. The schoolhouse is listed on the National Register of Historic Places.

Willard was an author of articles such as "Agricultural fences and enclosures", and was one of two compilers (with Orrin Guernsey) of the History of Rock County and Transactions of the Rock County Agricultural Society and Mechanics Institute (Janesville: Wiliam Doty and Brother, 1856).

In 1857, he was one of the 14 Janesville notables who helped form the first board of trustees of The Mutual Life Insurance Co., later to become Northwestern Mutual Life.

== Personal life ==
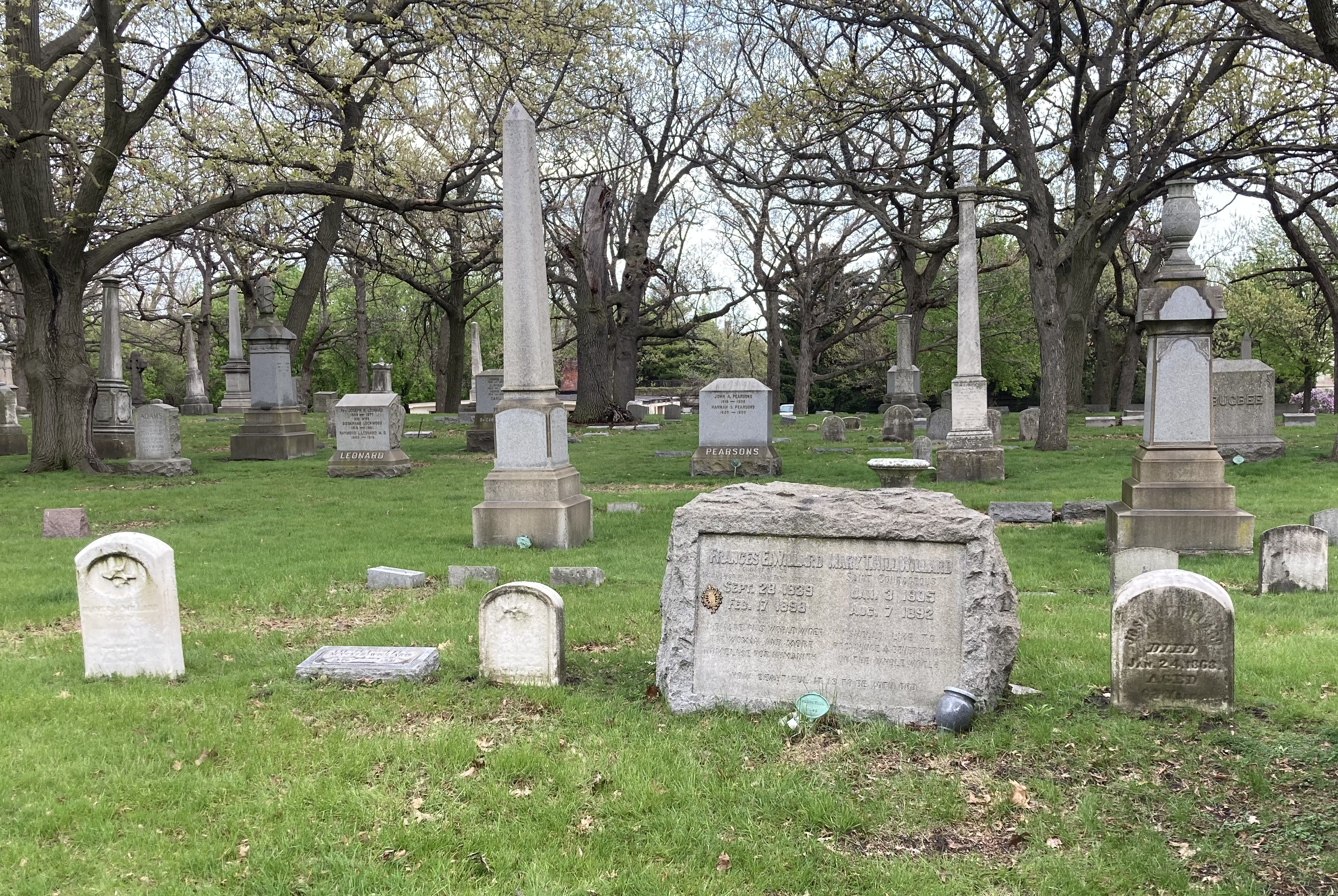
Willard's grave (rightmost) at Rosehill Cemetery

In 1858, the Willard family moved to Evanston, Illinois so that Mary and Frances could attend college and their brother Oliver could go to the Garrett Biblical Institute. The girls had attended Milwaukee Female College, where their mother's sister was a teacher Frances would become a world-famous suffragist and first Dean of Women at Northwestern University.

Willard died in Churchville on January 24, 1868, and was buried at Rosehill Cemetery in Chicago.

== Family ==
Josiah Flint Willard was a 5th great-grandson of Simon Willard (1605–1676), a Massachusetts colonist.
