= Mary Thompson Hill Willard =

American teacher and social reformer

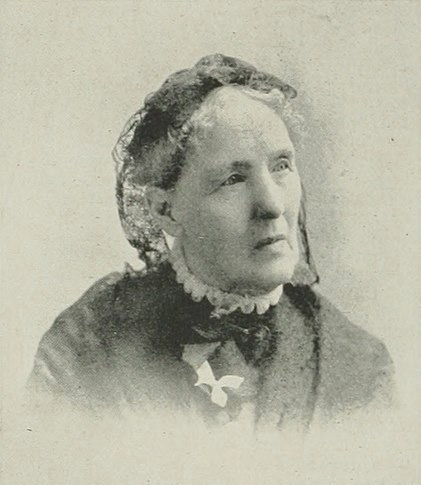
- Portrait photo from A Woman of the Century
- Born: January 3, 1805; Danville, Vermont
- Died: August 7, 1892 (aged 87); Evanston, Illinois
- Occupation(s): Teacher, social reformer
- Spouse: Josiah Flint Willard (m. 1831; died 1868)
- Children: 4
- Relatives: Frances Willard (daughter); Morilla M. Norton (niece)

Mary Thompson Hill Willard (January 3, 1805 – August 7, 1892) was an American teacher and social reformer. Her daughter, Frances Willard, was the founder and president of the World's Woman's Christian Temperance Union (W.C.T.U.) as well as president of the National W.C.T.U.

== Early life and education ==
Mary Thompson Hill was born on a farm in North Danville, Vermont, January 3, 1805. Her father was John Hill, of Lee, New Hampshire, and her mother, Polly Thompson Hill, was a daughter of Nathaniel Thompson, of Durham and Holderness, New Hampshire. Both the Hills and the Thompsons were families of note, and their descendants include many well-known names in New Hampshire history. John Hill removed to Danville in the pioneer period of that region, and on his farm of 300 acres (120 ha), a few miles west of the Connecticut River, he and his wife made a home. Their oldest son, James Hill, had high ambitions. Mary, strongly resembling her brother James, was the second daughter in the family, each one of whom possessed abilities of a high order.

Her early education was obtained in the country district school and in the log school house of a new area, but the schools were taught usually by students or graduates of Dartmouth College and Middlebury College, who often boarded in Mary's home, and whose attainments and character made deep impressions for good upon the susceptible child. At the age of 12, her father sold his Vermont farm and removed to the new region of the Genesee valley in western New York. In the new settlement, 14 miles (23 km) west of Rochester, New York, now known as the town of Ogden, New York, Willarad grew to young womanhood. She was a good student and a wide reader, and at the age of 15, taught her first school.

== Career ==
Teaching proved to be an attractive occupation, and she continued for eleven years in Monroe County, New York, near Rochester. Fine needlework and fine spinning, the fashionable domestic accomplishments in those days, gave her pleasure. She possessed in an unusual degree an admiration for the beautiful, especially in language. She had the poetic faculty, was a sweet singer, gifted conversationalist, attractive in appearance, and dignified in manner.

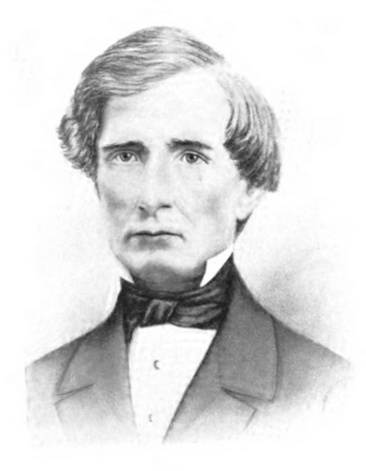
Josiah Willard

She developed a relationship with the son of her father's near neighbors, the Willards, who had removed there from Vermont. Josiah Flint Willard was a young man of irreproachable character and brilliant talents. They married on November 3, 1831, and their new home was set up in Churchville, New York. Both were active members of the Union Church in Ogden.

The family resided in their first home until four children had been born, the only son, Oliver, two daughters who died in infancy, and Frances Elizabeth, who was a delicate child in her second year, when her parents decided to remove to Oberlin, Ohio, in order to secure educational advantages for themselves and their children.

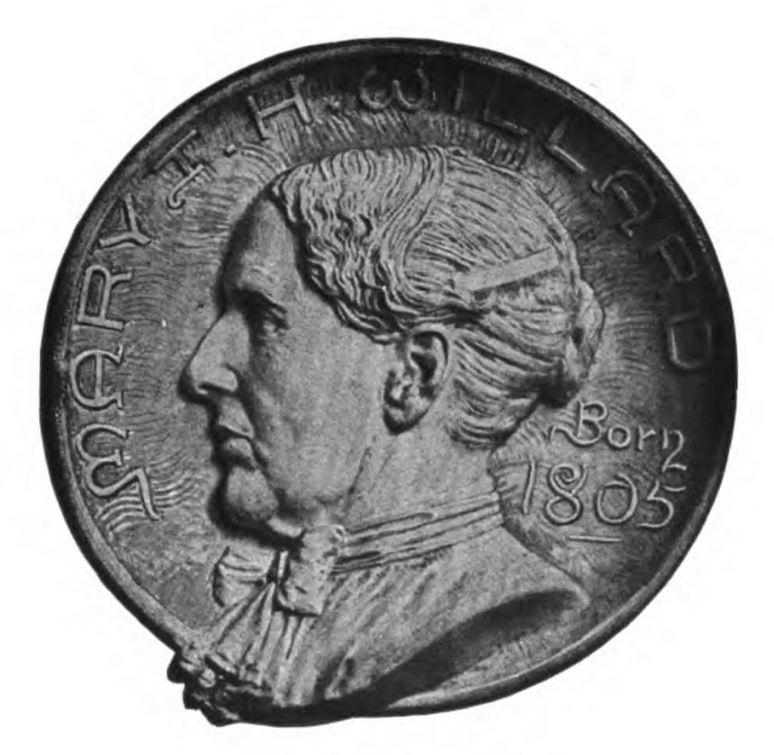
Willard in bas relief

Josiah entered the regular college course, which he had nearly completed when hemorrhage of the lungs warned him to seek at once a new environment. She studied five years in Oberlin College, keeping pace with her husband so far as possible, while she also participated in the literary society and social gatherings. The years they spent in Oberlin were happy years to Mrs. Willard. There her youngest child, Mary, was born, the year following their arrival. Her domestic life was well-ordered, and her three children shared the most careful training, while Willard's intellectual and social gifts drew to their home a circle of choice friends from among the most cultivated women of Oberlin. They formed a circle for study, long before a "woman's club" had ever been heard of, and kept pace with husbands, brothers and sons among the college faculty or in the student ranks. When necessity required the family to removal to a drier climate for the husband's sake, Willard prepared for the long overland journey, and herself drove one of the three emigrant wagons which conveyed the family and their possessions to the Territory of Wisconsin.

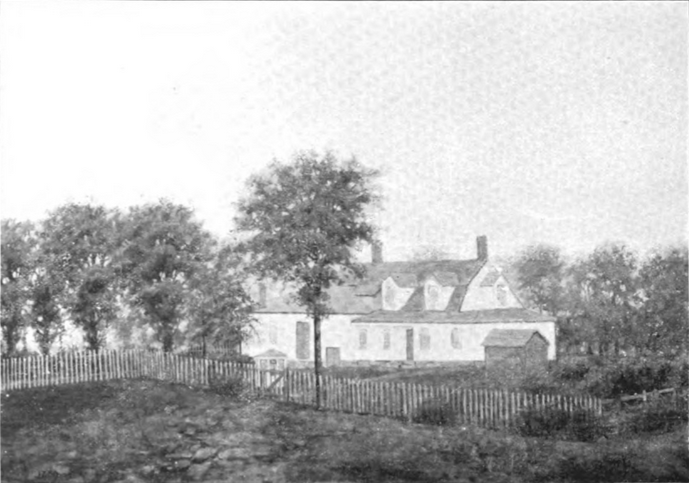
"Forest Home"

The summer of 1846 saw the Willards settled on an isolated farm near Janesville, Wisconsin. The trials associated with pioneer life could not be avoided, but they were accepted by the parents. Soon, Josiah was a leader in the church, a magistrate in the community and a legislator in the State, meantime having created a beautiful estate, which was named "Forest Home". There, they passed twelve years, during which time they converted from Congregationalism to Methodism, a Protestant denomination that placed an emphasis on social justice and service to the world.

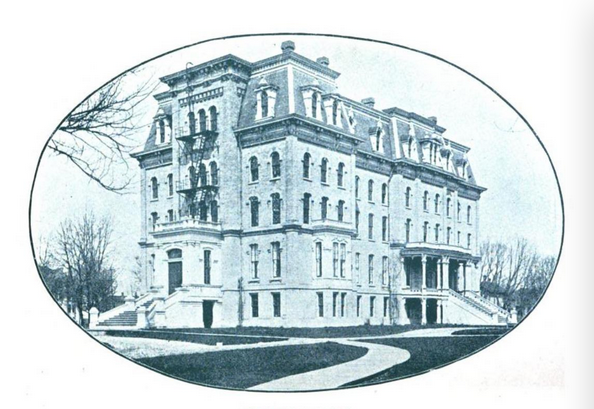
Northwestern Female College

The family then removed to Evanston, Illinois near Chicago, that the daughters might be educated without sending them from home. Residing there for nearly eighteen years, Mrs. Willard enjoyed the surroundings, tastes, and culture for which she was so well adapted. In 1869, Willard was chosen to be one of 15 trustees of the newly established Northwestern Female College. She associated with Sarah Killgore Wertman.

In June, 1862, the Willard's youngest child, Mary, died; in 1868, Josiah died; and in 1878, so did the Willard's only son, Oliver.

== Death and legacy ==
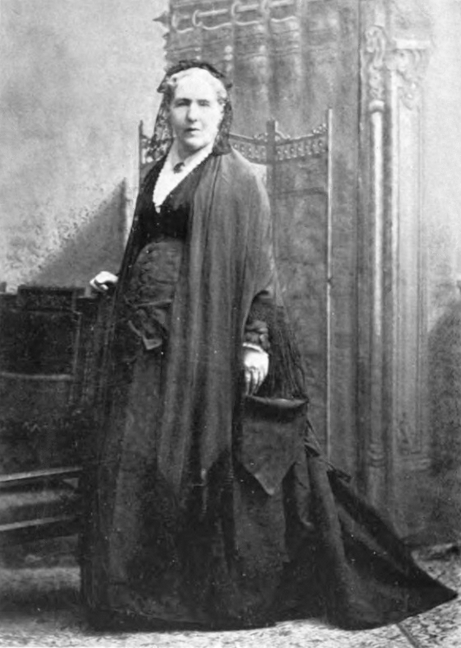
Willard (age 80)

Willard died in Evanston after a brief illness, August 7, 1892, at the age of 87 years. At her funeral it was said,— "She was a reformer by nature. She made the world's cause her own and identified herself with all its fortunes. Nothing of its sorrow, sadness or pain was foreign to her. With a genius, a consecration, a beauty and a youth which had outlived her years, a soul eager still to know, to learn, to catch every word God had for her, she lived on. a center of joy and comfort in this most typical and almost best known home in America. She stood a veritable Matterhorn of strength to this daughter. Given a face like hers, brave, benignant, patient, yet resolute, a will inflexible for duty, a heart sensitive to righteousness and truth, yet tender as a child's, given New England puritanism and rigor, its habits of looking deep into every problem, its consciousness full of God, its lofty ideal of freedom and its final espousal of every noble cause, and you and I shall never blame the stalwart heart, well-nigh crushed because mother is gone." The birthday motto adopted in the celebration of Madam Willard's 80 birthday was, "It is better further on," and her household name was "Saint Courageous".

In 1894, Frances Willard and Minerva Brace Norton published Willard's biography, A great mother; sketches of Madam Willard (Chicago, Women's temperance publishing association).

A granite marker in honor of Willard was erected in 1934 by the W.C.T.U in the Stanton Schoolhouse yard, North Danville township, Vermont.
