= Willard Homestead (Harrisville, New Hampshire) =

Historic house in New Hampshire, United States

- U.S. National Register of Historic Places
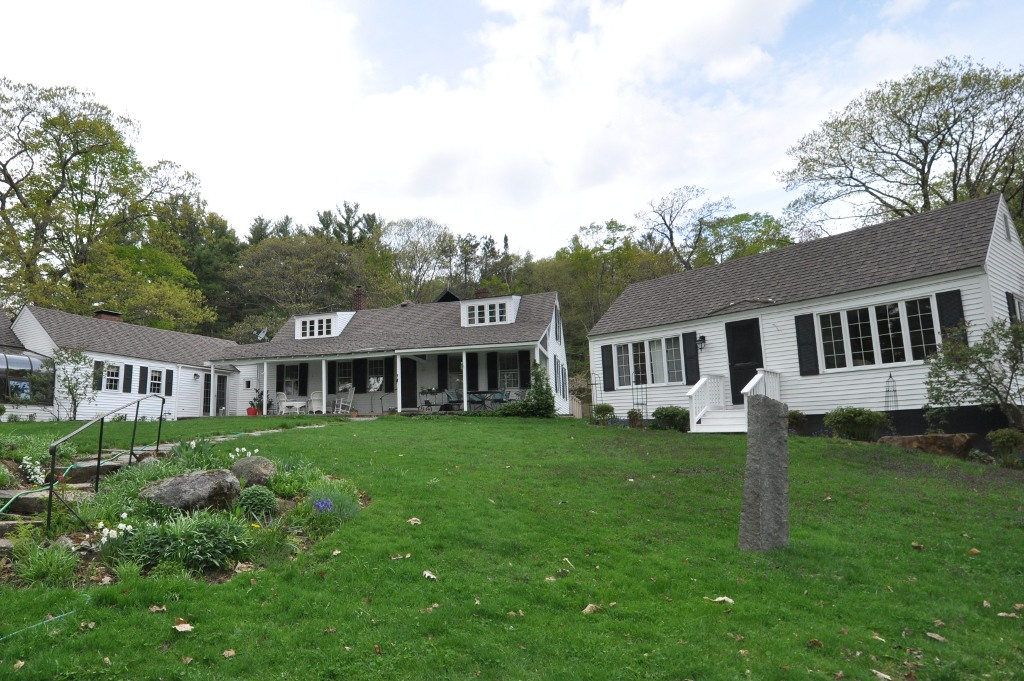

- Location within New Hampshire Location within the United States
- Location: Sunset Hill Ave., Harrisville, New Hampshire
- Coordinates: 42°56′30″N 72°9′21″W
- Area: 2.2 acres (0.89 ha)
- Built: 1787
- Architectural style: Cape cottage
- MPS: Harrisville MRA
- NRHP reference No.: 86003249
- Added to NRHP: January 14, 1988

The Willard Homestead is a historic house on Sunset Hill Road in Harrisville, New Hampshire. Built about 1787 and enlarged several times, it is notable as representing both the town's early settlement history, and its summer resort period of the early 20th century. The house was listed on the National Register of Historic Places in 1988.

== Description and history ==
The Willard Homestead stands in a rural area of western Harrisville, west of the junction of Sunset Hill Road and Monadnock Road. The main house is a rambling structure with a central 1 1/2-story frame section flanked by similarly sized wings. A two-story addition in the 1880s gave the house a T shape. It was converted into a summer residence in 1900, adding the front porch, dormers, and garage. The property also includes a barn, which is believed to date to the 18th century, and horse sheds that were converted to residential use as a guest house.

The oldest portion of this 1 1/2-story Cape style house was built c. 1787, and was for many years in the hands of the Willard family. Its first owner, Elijah Willard, served as pastor of the local Baptist church. It was enlarged in the 1880s, and in 1900 it was purchased by Wellington Wells, a state senator from Massachusetts, as a summer residence. Wells' guests included United States Supreme Court associate justice David J. Brewer.

== See also ==
- National Register of Historic Places listings in Cheshire County, New Hampshire
