= Sallie F. Chapin =

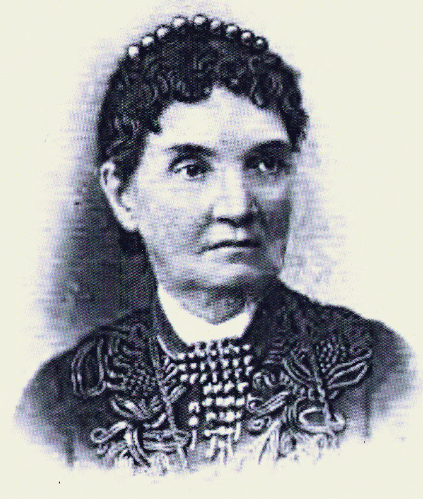
Sallie F. Moore Chapin

Sallie Flournoy Moore Chapin (March 30, 1830 - April 19, 1896) was an American author and temperance worker. She was affiliated with the Ladies' Memorial Association, Soldiers' Relief Society, Ladies' Auxiliary Christian Association, Woman's Christian Temperance Union (W.C.T.U.), and the Woman's Press Association of the South.

== Early life ==
Sarah ("Sallie") Flournoy Moore was born on March 30, 1830, in Charleston, South Carolina. Her maternal ancestors, Elizabeth Martha Vigneron Simons, were Huguenots, who came to the Colonies in 1685 and settled in Rhode Island. Her two great-grandfathers, Vigneron and Tousager, were killed in the Revolutionary War. She had Scottish relatives on her father's side. Her father was a Methodist minister and he moved to the northern part of the State. Moore's father died in the pulpit at a union camp meeting, during the Civil War, after receiving a dispatch announcing the death of his son in a battle.

Moore was reared and educated in Cokesbury, South Carolina.

== Career ==
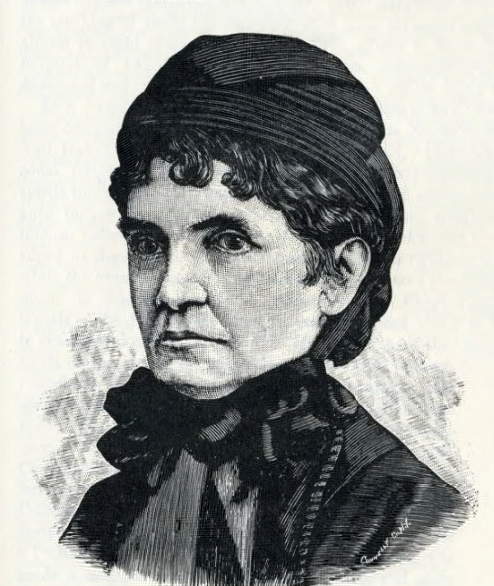
Sallie F. Chapin, Northern Illinois University Digital Library

From early childhood she showed a fondness and talent for authorship. Chapin wrote much, but she published only one book, Fitzhugh St. Clair, the South Carolina Rebel Boy; or, It Is No Crime to Be Born a Gentleman (1872).

The war broke her family fortune: Leonard Chapin died in 1879 after the conflict ended.

Chapin became involved in the Women's Christian Temperance Union during the 1880. Leadership of the South Carolinian chapter began during 1883. She did much to extend that order in the South, where conservatism hindered the work for a long time. In 1881 she attended the convention in Washington, D.C., where she made a reply to the address of welcome on behalf of the South, ending with a poem setting forth the intentions of the W.C.T.U.

She believed in prohibition as the remedy for intemperance, and was recognized as both a writer and conversationalist. In the Chicago W.C.T.U. convention, in 1882, when the Prohibition Home Protection Party was formed, she was made a member of the executive committee, and by pen and voice she popularized that movement in the South. She was at one time president of the Woman's Press Association of the South.

Her effort led to the opening of the South Carolina Industrial and Winthrop Normal College, later Winthrop University.

== Personal life ==
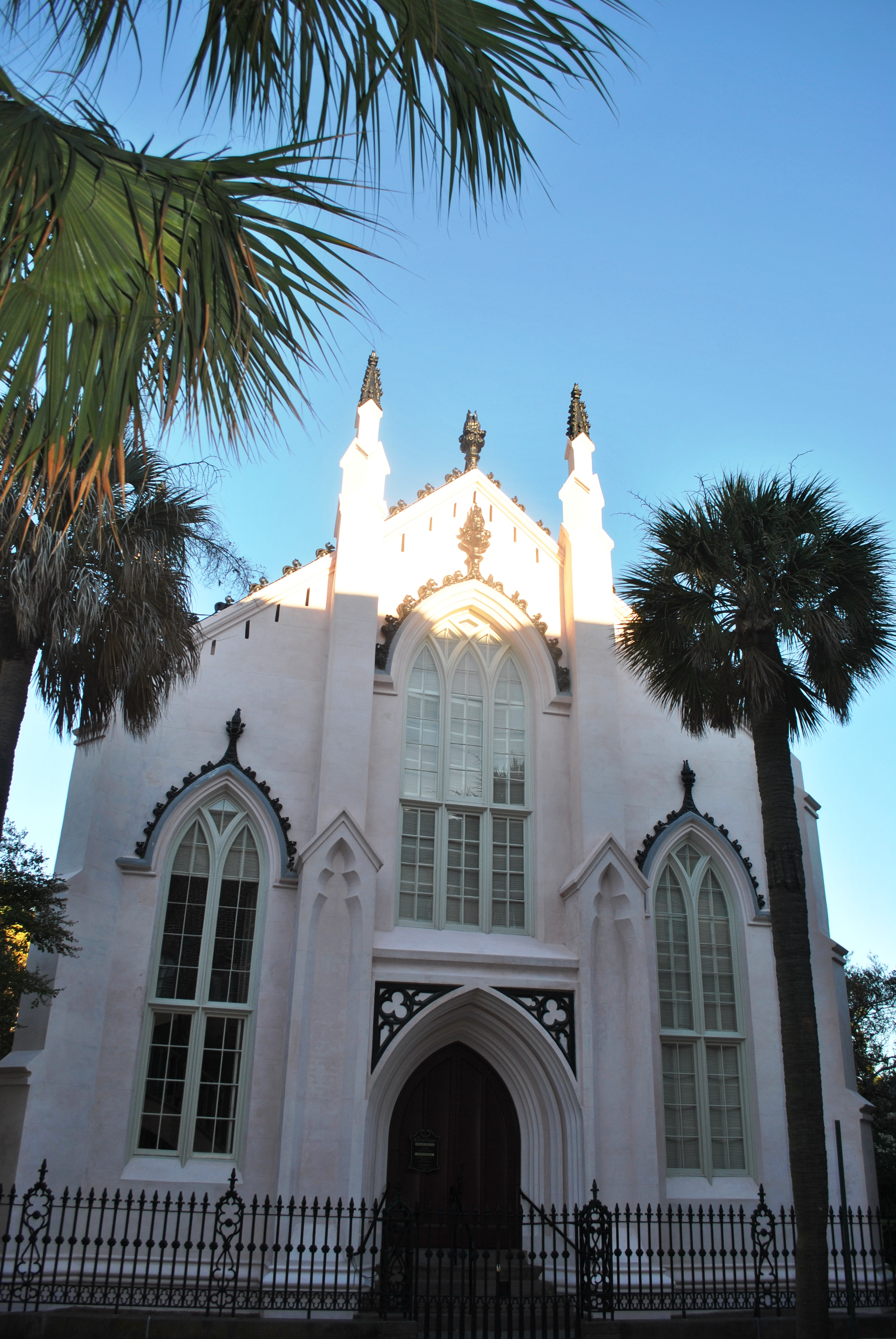
French Huguenot Church

Sallie Moore's wedding occurred while she was still a girl, and her married life was singularly happy. Her husband was one of the founders of YMCA of Charleston, and one of its chief officers for years.

They also adopted George Mendenhall Chapin; George & Son, was edited by Nancy Lu Wilson Rose in 2009.

Sallie Chapin died on April 19, 1896.
