= Park Ridge Youth Campus =

- Illinois Industrial School for Girls
- U.S. National Register of Historic Places
- U.S. Historic district
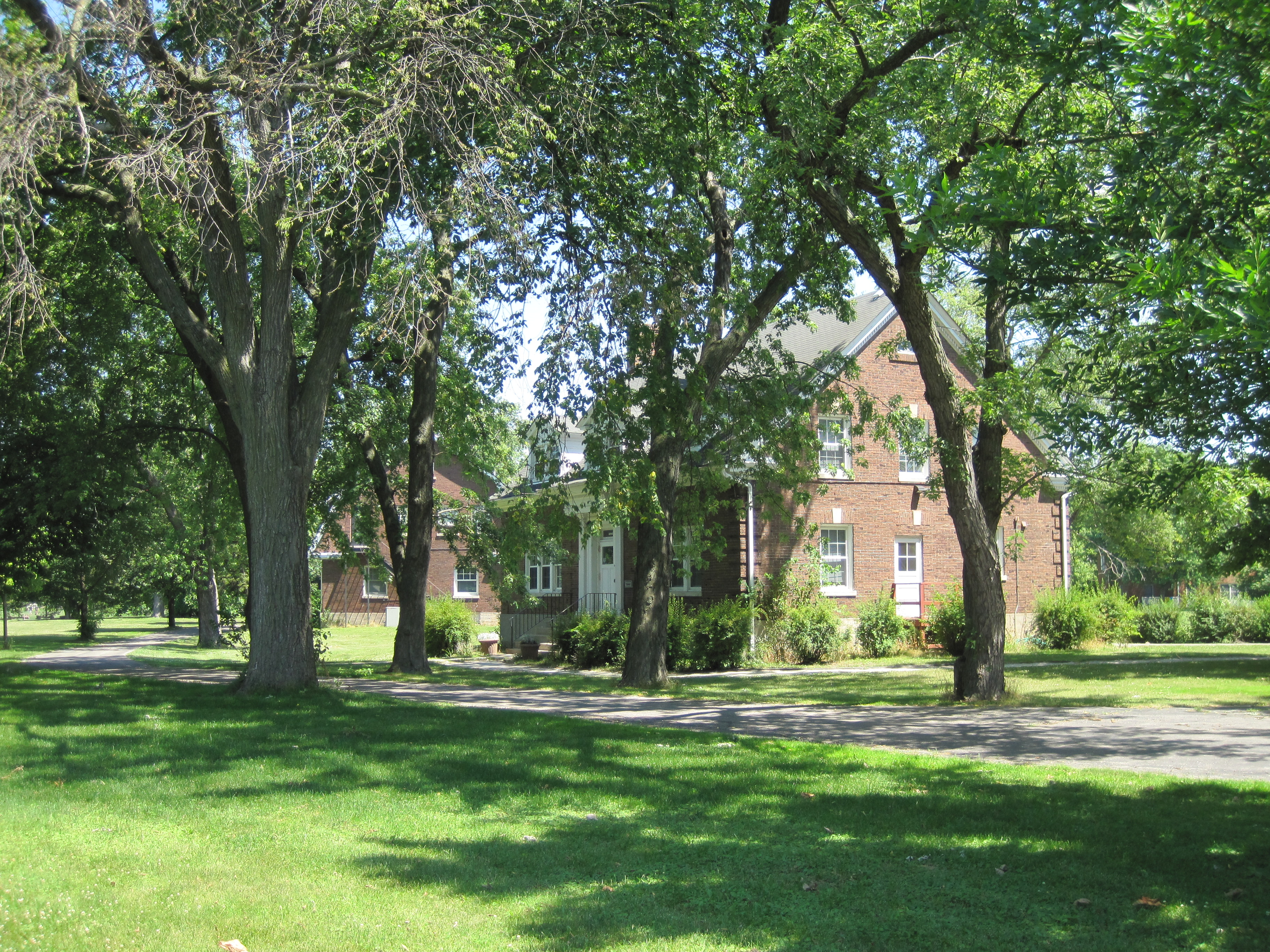
- Two of the campus buildings in 2011
- Location: 733 North Prospect Avenue; Park Ridge, Illinois
- Website: www.prparks.org/prospect-park
- NRHP reference No.: 98000978

The Park Ridge Youth Campus, or just The Youth Campus, was a school and orphanage in Park Ridge, Illinois from 1908 to 2012. The campus is on the National Register of Historic Places as the Illinois Industrial School for Girls, and was also known as the Park Ridge School for Girls. The campus is now Prospect Park and owned by the Park Ridge Park District.

== History ==
=== Evanston ===
The Youth Campus traced its foundation to 1877 as the Illinois Industrial School for Girls, in what was then South Evanston, Illinois.

=== Park Ridge ===
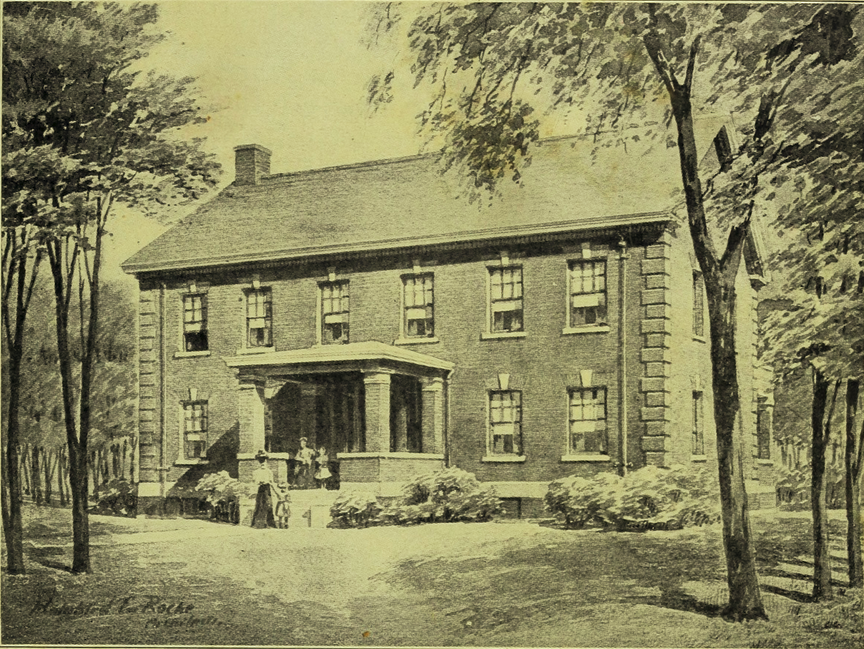
Illinois Industrial School for Girls (Park Ridge, 1909)

The facility was relocated to Park Ridge in 1908 and renamed the Park Ridge School for Girls in 1913.

Several of the buildings were funded by Julius Rosenwald, and were designed by Holabird & Roche, the same firm which designed the Chicago Board of Trade Building and Soldier Field. Eight of the campus buildings are contributing elements of the campus' listing on the National Register of Historic Places.

When boys were first admitted in 1980, the facility was renamed the Park Ridge Youth Campus, before being simply renamed The Youth Campus in the 1990s.

By the 2011 the school services were being provided by Maine Township High School District 207.

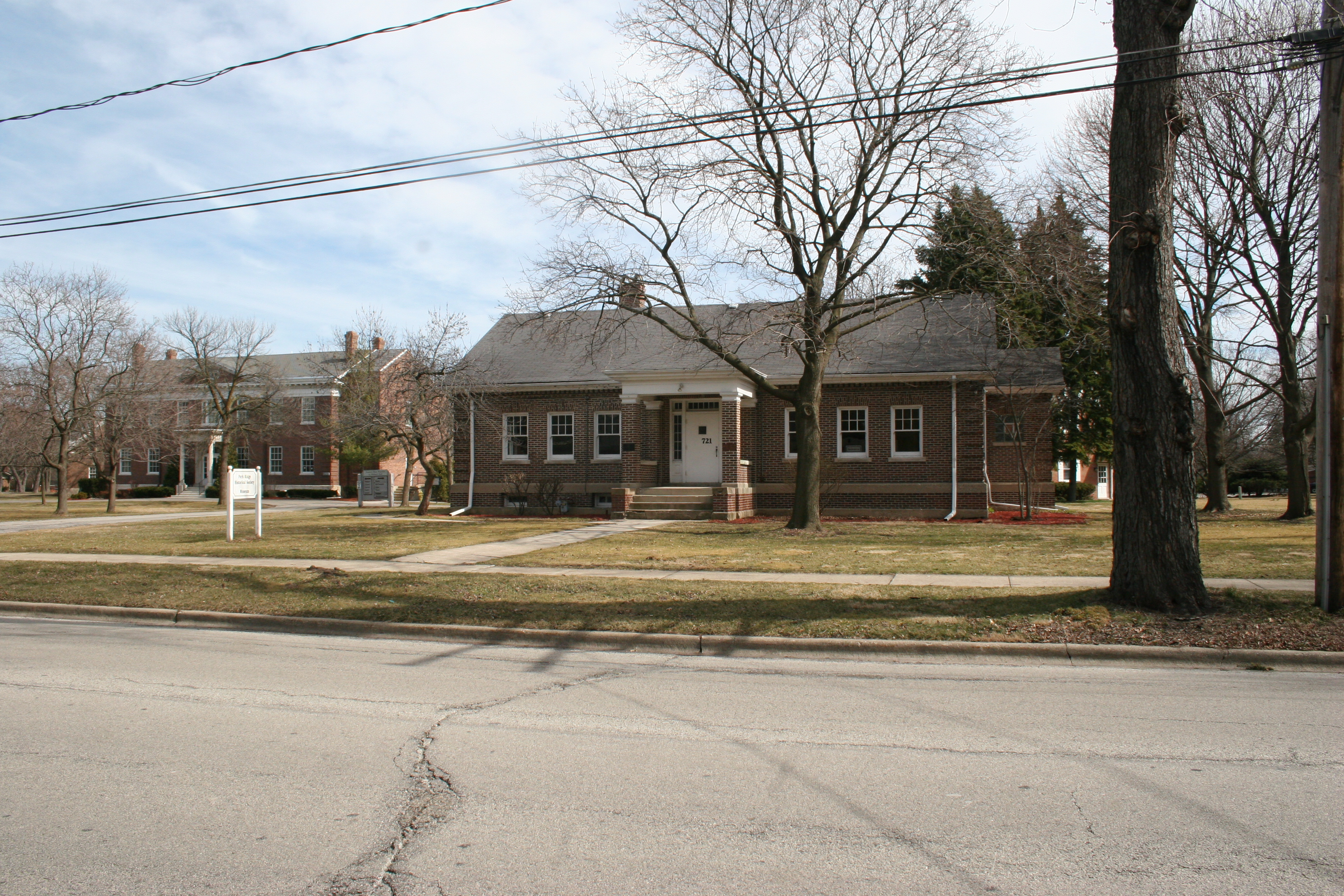
Solomon Cottage in 2012

=== After school ===
The Youth Campus closed in the summer of 2012. The organization merged into the existing Chicago not-for-profit organization Children's Home + Aid.

The campus itself was split into parcels, with plans to sell the north part, approximately 60%, to Mark Elliott Corporation for housing development, and the south part, approximately 40%, to the Park Ridge Recreation and Park District for $6.4 million. The Park District voters approved a referendum in April 2013 for a $13.2 million bond for the purchase and conversion to a park. The Park District's property was re-opened as Prospect Park in May 2016.

Except for Emery Cottage, Solomon Cottage, and Wohlers Hall, the Park District had the campus buildings torn down in March 2015; in exchange for allowing demolition, the Illinois Historic Preservation Agency required that the demolished buildings be recorded with architectural details, that Solomon Cottage and Wohlers Hall be restored, and that Emery Cottage also remain preserved. The Solomon Cottage, built in 1908, was leased on a long-term basis to the Park Ridge Historical Society in 2016, and renovated in 2017 to become the historical society's Park Ridge History Center.
