= Frances Willard Schoolhouse =

- U.S. National Register of Historic Places
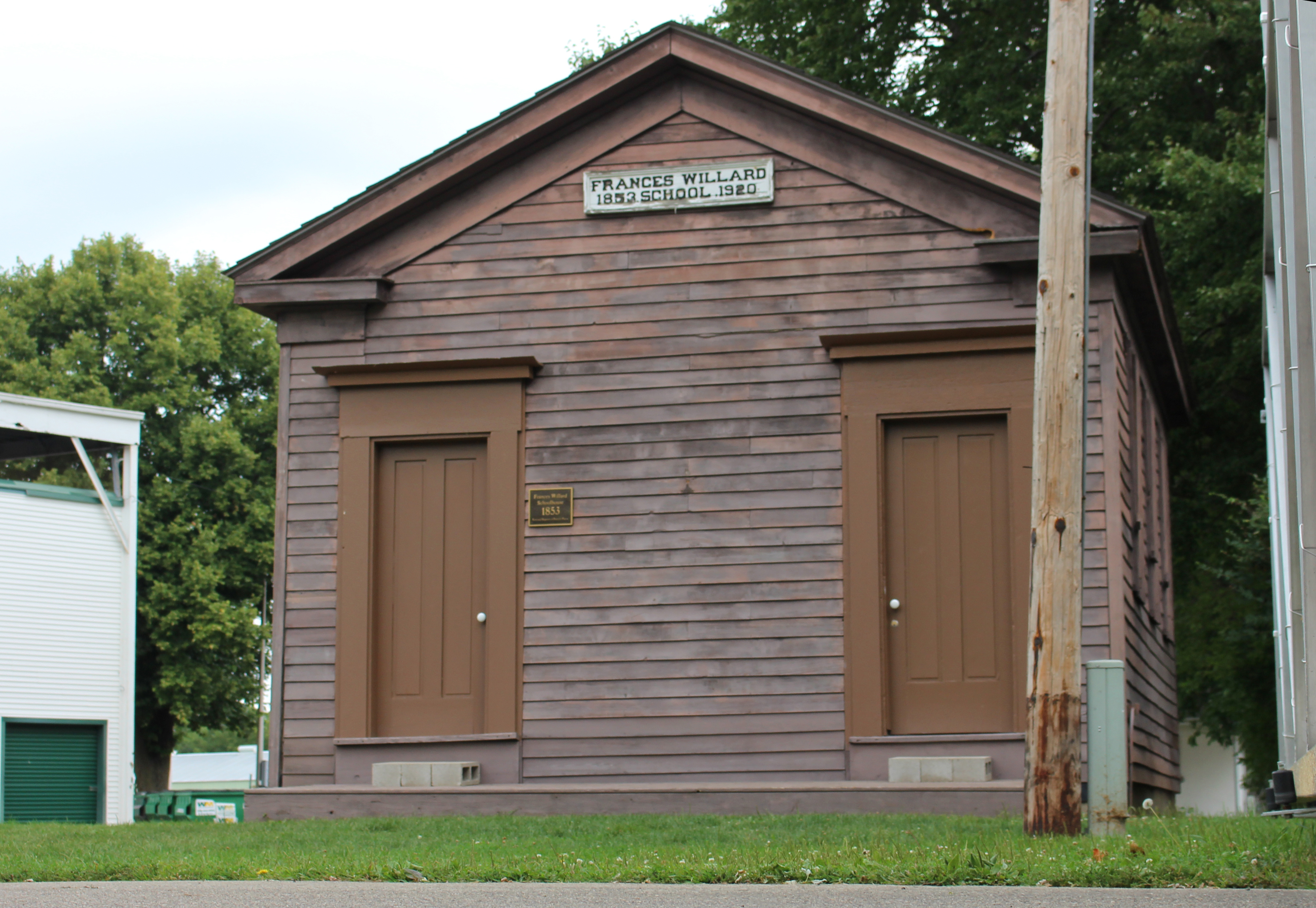
- Location: Janesville, Wisconsin
- Built: 1853
- Architect: Josiah Willard/David Inman
- Architectural style: Greek Revival
- NRHP reference No.: 77000054
- Added to NRHP: October 5, 1977

The Frances Willard Schoolhouse is a one-room schoolhouse built in 1853 in Janesville, Wisconsin. Prominent women's suffragist and social reformer Frances Willard studied and taught there. In 1977 the school was added to the National Register of Historic Places.

== History ==
In 1846 Josiah Willard and his family came to Rock County from New York, bringing along 7-year-old daughter Frances. Josiah was a progressive farmer who helped found the Rock County Agricultural and Mechanics' Association and promoted the first Wisconsin State Fair, which was held in Janesville. He also co-wrote the 1856 History of Rock County.

In 1853 Josiah, David Inman, and other neighbors built the school that is the subject of this article, a one-room frame building with the low-pitched roof, frieze boards, and cornice returns - all hallmarks of the Greek Revival architectural style that was popular at that time. It was initially called the "little brown schoolhouse." Willard later wrote of it:

It was plain and inviting, that little bit of a building, standing under the trees on the river bank. No paint has ever brightened it, outside or in, from that day to the present. It looks like a natural growth; like a sort of big ground nut. Inside, the pine desks were arranged around the wall, boys on one side, girls on the other, a slight platform with rude desk taking up the end nearest the door.... It was a cold winter morning when school opened... we got the key, made the fire, and were the first to take possession. So passed the day - our first in the old school house we learned to love in spite of - nay, perhaps the better because of, its ugliness...

Frances attended the little brown school as a student for about ten months in the 1850s, then came back to teach in 1858. After her time in Janesville, she studied in Milwaukee and points beyond, earning M.S., M.A., and L.L.D. degrees. She went on to be the president of Evanston College for Ladies and Dean of Women at Northwestern University. She and Susan B. Anthony founded the National Council of Women in 1888 and she served as its first president. She worked for social issues, advocating legal protection for women, an eight-hour work day, and the right of women to vote. She worked against drug abuse and alcoholism as president of the Woman's Christian Temperance Union and later as first president of the World's WCTU. Given all this, she was one of the prominent women leaders of the 1800s.

Willard fondly remembered the little brown school and visited it shortly before she died in 1898. In 1904 when the school was remodeled, it was renamed "Frances Willard School" in her honor. The Rock County WCTU bought the building in 1920 to preserve it, then donated it to the Rock County Historical Society in 1969. In 1972 it was moved to the Rock County fairgrounds.

On June 4, 2016, it was relocated from the Rock County fairgrounds to the campus of the Rock County Historical Society through the financial support of local businessman Bob Kimball and an anonymous donor.

The school was placed on the NRHP because it is the best-preserved structure connected to Frances Willard's time in Wisconsin. It is also one of the oldest surviving school buildings in Rock County.
