= Chicago Woman's Club =

Historical feminist organization in US

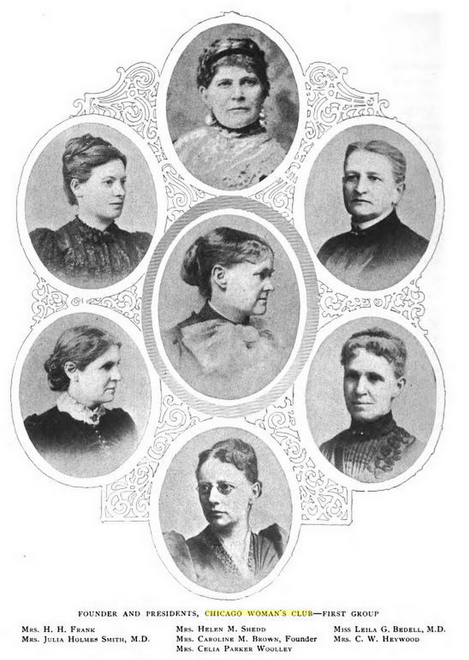
Founder and Presidents, Chicago Woman's Club.

The Chicago Woman's Club was formed in 1876 by women in Chicago who were interested in "self and social improvement." The club was notable for creating educational opportunities in the Chicago region and helped create the first juvenile court in the United States. The group was primarily made up of wealthy and middle-class white women, with physicians, lawyers and university professors playing "prominent roles." The club often worked towards social and educational reform in Chicago. It also hosted talks by prominent women, including artists and suffragists.

The Chicago Woman's Club was responsible for creating the first Protective Agency in the United States that dealt with assault and rape of women. The group was active in reform of the Cook County Insane Hospital and of other health reforms. They helped establish the first kindergartens and nursery schools in Chicago. Later, the club became involved with both the woman's suffrage movement and also with promoting birth control.

The club met until 1999, when the group dissolved. Assets of the club went to support scholarships and other philanthropic endeavors.

== History ==
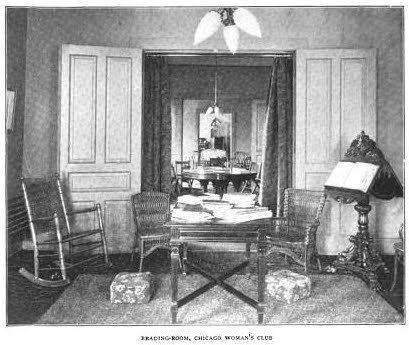
Reading Room of the Chicago Woman's Club.

The Chicago Woman's Club was first formed in 1876, on May 17. In 1885, the club incorporated, and changed the name officially to the Chicago Woman's Club. The founder of the group was Caroline Brown, who suggested to friends that they form a group in order to socialize and associate. By 1877, the club was written up in the Woman's Journal and had approximately thirty members, many of which were active in social reform and in literary and philanthropic circles. The kind of self-improvement study that the club was involved with was "often as demanding as a first year college curriculum." The education provided by the club was, at the time, one of the only ways most women could pursue a "post graduate education." The Chicago Woman's Club organized itself into six main committees: Reform, Philanthropy, Home, Education, Art and literature and Philosophy and science. Each member of the club was required to serve on at least one committee. The club's officers were not all members of the Chicago Woman's Club. Instead, half of the officers were members and the other half came out of other Chicago club organizations. Membership was exclusive and new members had to be sponsored by current members, "and their acceptance into the club was often dependent on the importance of their sponsor."

The members of the club initially met at Brown's house. In 1877, they rented rooms in the Chicago Literary Club on Monroe Street. Later, they started to meet at the Palmer House, and Grand Pacific. In 1894, the club had moved into the Potter Building, and to mark the occasion, they held a reception, where for the first time men were also invited to attend. Later, in 1916, the club would vote against allowing an "Associate Membership" for men. The club had a new location on Michigan Avenue in 1929, and also during that year again considered creating an "Associate Membership" for men. The building on Michigan Ave. was six stories high and designed by Holabird & Roche along with engineer Frank E. Brown. This building is now part of Columbia College. The group increased from 30 to 60 members in 1881. By 1894, there were 600 members. In 1896, the club had increased to 730 members. In 1901, there were 900 members, increasing to 1,000 by 1906, and to 1,200 members in 1921. Annually, the Chicago Woman's Club produced a large yearbook which described the activities of the club over the past year. The club's motto was "Humani nihil a me alienum puto." On May 25, 1892, they adopted the official colors for the club of ivory white and gold.

In 1876, the club admitted the first Jewish women, Henriette and Hannah Solomon. The first African American member of the club was Fannie Barrier Williams. She went through a difficult approval process which caused dissension in the club. In 1895, the club voted not to exclude anyone based on race. She was finally made a member in 1896. In 1894, a club for African American women which was based on the Chicago Woman's Club was organized.

In 1901, the club faced a difficult time when an anonymous letter was sent which accused member, Mrs. Robert Farson, of "financial dishonesty." Farson, and others accused, demanded an investigation. Handwriting analysis indicated that the person sending the letter was "No.75," a designation that would have been obvious to club members. Other possible members may have been those designated as "70 and 76." The discovery committee later decided that the letter writer was Alice Bradford Wiles, who both disputed the accusation and threatened to sue the club for "slander and damages."

=== Reform ===
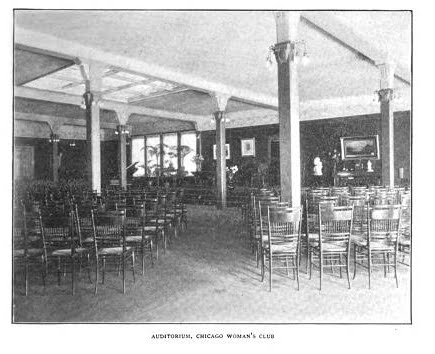
The Auditorium of the Woman's Club of Chicago.

The Chicago Woman's Club started engaging with various social reforms around the mid 80s. Club members were moved by families who endured difficult working conditions and by children who were forced to work for their families. Starting in January 1896, some club members held monthly meetings to study laws that affected or were about women and children.

The Chicago Woman's Club became involved in the Cook County Insane Hospital, where they supported Delia Howe become the assistant physician. The Chicago Women's Club also made the case that further appointments should be women after Howe left and asked them to appoint and maintain Harriet C. B. Alexander to the open position. The club continued to work towards improvements for female inmates at the hospital, conducted visits and monitored the status of the hospital, reporting on violations. They even submitted in 1886, a proposed amendment to the laws for the care of the insane and common criminals. Most of these duties were carried out by the club's Reform Committee. In 1893, the Reform Committee was still involved with helping to improve the hospital. It had secured enough food and clothing for those inside the Insane Hospital by 1904.

The Chicago Women's Club was also involved with asking for a general hospital to treat those with "infectious diseases." The club worked towards the establishment of such a hospital for many years. The Reform Committee also worked to create a Children's Hospital Society of Chicago. In 1909, the club suggested a way to improve medical staffing at the county jail.

The Chicago Woman's Club was active in other health-related issues. The club promoted advertisements against spitting in the city of Chicago, and were also in support of anti-cigarette legislation. The club pledged $11,343 to support the cancer seal campaign in 1930. The club was an early promoter of cancer education.

They were involved with helping to appoint a night matron at the jail in 1884. The night matron would look after women and children who were prisoners in the jail. Chicago Women's Club members, Ellen Henrotin and Sara Hackett Stevenson, were instrumental in creating a Protective Agency for Women and Children in 1886. This Protective Agency was the first in the country to protect wives who were victims of assault and rape. The club provided legal aid for women facing various issues, provided lawyers to those who could not afford them, and often "appeared in court on behalf of rape victims." In 1897, the Protective Agency merged with the Bureau of Justice, but "the women asked for and received sole jurisdiction over the cases affecting women and children." The Protective Agency again moved into a different merger with the Legal Aid Society of Chicago in 1905. Also in 1905, the club petitioned Illinois state about a proposed amendment to protect children under the crimes act.

The work of committee members such as Julia Lathrop, Jane Addams and Lucy Flower influenced the creation of the Illinois Juvenile Court Law of 1899, creating the first juvenile court in the country. The club helped pay the salaries of the probation officers who would later work in the court. Prior to creating a juvenile justice system, "bad kids" in Chicago were arrested on spurious charges and left in jails with adults with no legal recourse. In 1929, the Chicago Woman's Club, along with other organizations funded a study of "behavior problems of delinquent boys."

In 1915, Rachelle Yarros convinced the Chicago Woman's Club to create a birth control committee. By 1916, the club was addressing issues of birth control. The discussion of contraceptives was controversial, and also could have resulted in the arrest of those promoting it, since laws were still on the books preventing the dissemination of information about birth control. The club also held a birth control conference, where James A. Field presented information on the subject. Yarros was appointed by the Chicago Woman's Club as the chair of the Chicago Citizen's Committee which created the Illinois Birth Control League. The league opened various clinics in Chicago in the 1920s, despite laws against allowing information about birth control in the city.

The Chicago Woman's Club was also involved in the woman's suffrage movement. In 1894, the group created the Chicago Political Equality League. The Political Equality League was considered a "conservative" group and it worked to "dispel the bogy of the anti-suffragists, to show the world that one can be a believer in votes for women and still be essentially feminine, be charming perhaps, and agreeable." The group also hosted talks about suffrage, and had suffragists, such as Susan B. Anthony, speak at the club.

Environmental concerns were also important to the club. Members spoke out against the killing of wild birds for the feathers used in fashionable women's clothing. In 1905, they supported a measure to preserve natural areas in Illinois.

=== Education ===
The Chicago Woman's Club was involved in many educational efforts. Some of these, like advocating for children's schooling in prisons, were tied into their other reform efforts. Early on, the club petitioned Mayor Roche to appoint women to vacancies in the Board of Education in Chicago in 1887. Later, the club nominated five women to the school board in 1890. Ada Celeste Sweet was appointed to the Board of Education in 1892, and the club urged the confirmation of her appointment. As an example to the Chicago Board of Education, in 1898 the club cleaned one of the schools from "attic to basement" as an example of what cleanliness and sanitation in a school building should look like. In 1916, the club urged the school board to choose teachers based on educational merit alone. Club member, Lucy Flower, lobbied successfully for Illinois to have a compulsory education law.

The Chicago Woman's Club also helped, along with Rose Haas Alschuler and her cousin Charlotte Kuh, to set up the first public nursery school in the United States, which was affiliated with the Chicago Board of Education. The club was also the first to provide funds for a kindergarten in the public schools. In 1905, the club created a fellowship for the John H. Hamline school which would provide funds for parents' and children's clubs.

The Chicago Woman's Club also supported education for the blind beyond public schooling. In 1906, members of the club taught the visually impaired in their homes, teaching Braille, shorthand, typewriting and weaving. The work had grown so much, that additional funds were needed and a proposed bill was introduced to provide it to the teachers.

In 1889, the club "adopted" Norwood Park School, donating funds and soliciting more for the school. The school was both an orphanage for over 300 homeless boys and a training school. The club also helped the School Children's Aid Society by donating time and "suitable new clothing" for poor students so they could attend school. The club also created a school for boys who were inmates at the Chicago common jail. The Chicago Women's Club ensured that boys in the county jail had a Thanksgiving dinner in 1898.

In 1885, the club began a training school for domestic servants. The club continued this work, creating a school, developing scholarships, providing housing for students and creating an employment agency. In 1900, the club also advocated for boys to learn how to cook in public schools. The idea also included teaching boys other domestic sciences, so that when they grew up, they would "make good husbands, able to help their wives in domestic economy." Vocational classes for interested students, which included scholarships, were started by the Chicago Woman's Club.

In 1892, the club helped finance women's dormitories at the University of Chicago. The dormitories cost $280,000. In 1897, the Chicago Woman's Club helped raise money to add to the Egyptian collection at the Chicago University.

In 1898, the club created an information center for students, providing resources and information for 50 cents an inquiry. The club also kept records about what kinds of questions were asked, and encouraged and took only serious inquiries into a given topic.

=== Labor issues ===
In addition to working on reform and education, the club supported worker's rights. During the World's Colombian Exposition, the Chicago Woman's Club urged those planning the event to stay open on Sundays in order to allow the working class to have the opportunity to visit. The Chicago Woman's Club also supported conferences like "Women in Modern Industrialism" which reported on the status of women in different professions. Catherine Waugh McCulloch spoke affirmatively on the topic of whether married women should be involved in business at the Women in Modern Industrialism conference.

In 1894, the club helped secure 200 jobs for women and girls. Later the club started the Women's Emergency Association, which helped find employment for about 1,500 individuals. The organization was credited by The Daily Republican for "influencing all the laws for the improvement of the conditions surrounding the working women and children of Illinois." The Chicago Woman's Club also developed an Employment Bureau.

The club also worked with the Women's Trade Union and helped boycott factories where conditions for workers were poor. The club voted to send representatives to speak on behalf of clerks who were overworked in various stores, and to advocate for half-holidays for them. In 1912, the club created a committee to investigate women's working conditions in the industrial sector and had as its stated goal to create a minimum wage for working women.

== Notable members ==
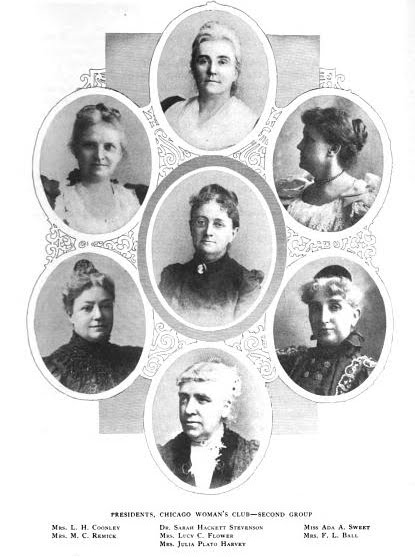
Presidents of the Chicago Woman's Club.

Many notable women were members of the club. Physician Sara Hackett Stevenson was president from 1892 to 1894. Ada Celeste Sweet was elected president in 1894. Novelist and preacher, Celia Parker Woolley, reformer Lucy Flower, Lydia Avery Coonley, and Julia Holmes Smith, also served as presidents. Many of the presidents of the Chicago Woman's Club had also been members of the Fortnightly Club.

- Jane Addams
- Anna Blount
- Louise DeKoven Bowen
- Myra Bradwell
- Lydia Avery Coonley
- Lucy Flower
- Ellen Martin Henrotin
- Mary Emma Holmes
- Mary Lewis Langworthy
- Julia Lathrop
- Emma Gilson Wallace
- Lena B. Mathes
- Catharine Waugh McCulloch
- Mary McDowell
- Anna E. Nicholes
- Bertha Palmer
- Elia Peattie
- Julia Holmes Smith
- Hanna G. Solomon
- Sara Hackett Stevenson
- Ada Celeste Sweet
- Marion Foster Washburne
- Alice Bradford Wiles
- Frances Willard
- Fannie Barrier Williams
- Celia Parker Woolley
- Rachelle Yarros
