= Yarros =

Yarros is a surname. Notable people with the surname include:

- Rachelle Yarros (1869–1946), American physician
- Rebecca Yarros (born 1981), American author
- Victor Yarros (1865–1956), American anarchist, lawyer and author
