= Illinois Birth Control League =

American advocacy organization

The Illinois Birth Control League (IBCL) was an organization created by the Chicago Citizens' Committee and the Chicago Woman's Club, to provide information and education about birth control. Later, the organization helped create the first birth control clinic in Chicago in the US state of Illinois. The early birth control clinics run by IBCL often had staff members on hand who were fluent in several languages, in order to better serve immigrant communities. The IBCL also sponsored discussions about issues relating to family planning and birth control.

== History ==
In 1916, Margaret Sanger visited Chicago to give a speech against Comstock laws and in support of birth control clinics. The speech drew around 1,200 people and "inspired the creation of the Illinois Birth Control League." By 1919, the league had been set up and was advertised in the Birth Control Review. In 1923, the IBCL opened its first birth control clinic, which was directed by Rachelle Yarros. This clinic was the second of its kind in the United States. The clinics enabled women who could not afford a private physician to receive practical family planning advice. Originally, the clinics were meant to be free clinics, but the city would not grant them the necessary license from the health commissioner. Because of this, the IBCL charged a "nominal fee" to give out oral information about birth control. In 1924, the IBCL was again denied a permit for the clinic to operate as a public clinic where information could be given out for free. IBCL opened a second birth control office in 1925. By 1937, over 20,000 women had been seen by the several clinics run by IBCL.

The IBCL and other women continued to fight against laws preventing the dissemination of information about birth control in Illinois during the late 1920s. In 1934, the IBCL, along with the Chicago Woman's Club, the Birth Control League and the Social Hygiene League of Chicago created a resolution, backed by three hundred women, to allow social workers to discuss family planning and to refer clients to birth control clinics.

IBCL incorporated in April 1924 with the name, "Illinois Birth Control League" with the mission of philanthropic and educational work relating to family planning. The IBCL became the Planned Parenthood League of Illinois in 1946, and then later, the Planned Parenthood Association, Chicago Area in 1947. Peggy Carr was the last president of the IBCL and oversaw the transition to Planned Parenthood.
