= Charles H. Walker =

American politician (1828–1877)

The Honorable Charles H. Walker
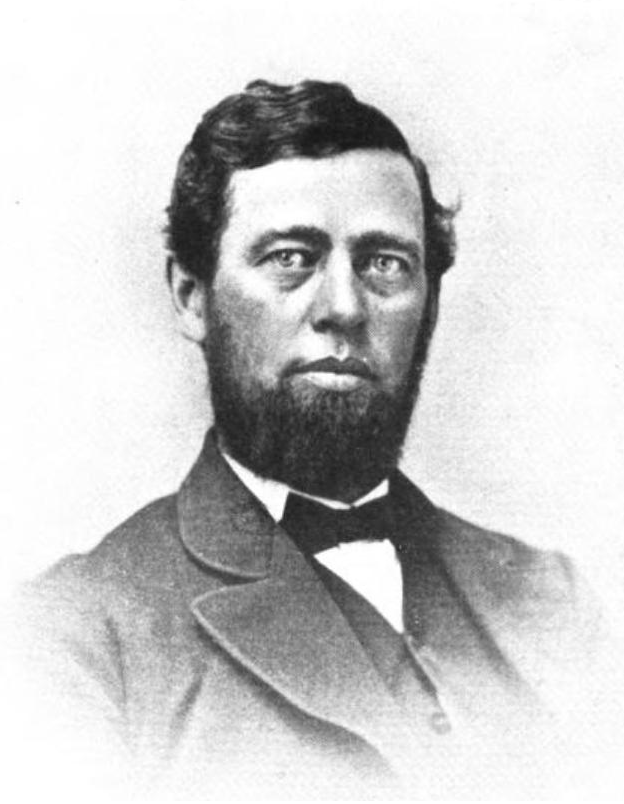

County Judge of Manitowoc County, Wisconsin
- In office January 1, 1858 – Summer 1862
- Preceded by: Isaac Parrish
- Succeeded by: Henry S. Pierpont

Member of the Wisconsin State Assembly from the Manitowoc 1st district
- In office January 1, 1856 – January 1, 1858
- Preceded by: James Bennett
- Succeeded by: Henry C. Hamilton

Personal details
- Born: September 5, 1828 Tully, New York, U.S.
- Died: December 14, 1877 (aged 49) Manitowoc Rapids, Wisconsin
- Cause of death: Stroke
- Resting place: Evergreen Cemetery, Manitowoc, Wisconsin
- Party: Democratic
- Spouses: Ione Fidelia Carpenter (m. 1865; died 1866); Elizabeth M. "Libbie" Homer (m. 1870–1877)
- Children: 2 (with Elizabeth)
- Education: Western Reserve College
- Profession: lawyer

Military service
- Allegiance: United States
- Branch/service: United States Army; Union Army
- Years of service: 1862–1865
- Rank: Major
- Unit: 21st Wis. Vol. Infantry
- Battles/wars: American Civil War: Kentucky Campaign (Cpt., Co. K, 21st Wis.); Battle of Perryville; Stones River Campaign; Battle of Stones River; Tullahoma campaign; Battle of Hoover's Gap; Chickamauga campaign; Battle of Davis's Cross Roads; Battle of Chickamauga (Took command, 21st Wis.); Atlanta campaign (Maj., 21st Wis.); Battle of Rocky Face Ridge; Battle of Resaca; Battle of Kennesaw Mountain; Battle of Marietta; Battle of Peachtree Creek; Battle of Jonesborough; Savannah campaign (Maj., 21st Wis.); Carolinas campaign (Maj., in command, 21st Wis.); Battle of Bentonville

Charles H. Walker (September 5, 1828 – December 14, 1877) was an American lawyer, jurist, and legislator. A Democrat, he was a member of the Wisconsin State Assembly for two terms, 1856 and 1857, and was County Judge of Manitowoc County, Wisconsin, from 1858 until 1862, when he resigned to volunteer for service as a Union Army officer in the American Civil War.

== Early life and career ==
Walker was born in Tully, New York, in 1828. As a child, his family moved to Ohio, where he was educated. He graduated from Western Reserve College in Cleveland in 1850 and quickly moved west to Kenosha, Wisconsin, where he studied law in the office of Frederick S. Lovell and was admitted to the bar.

In the Summer of 1854, he moved to Manitowoc, Wisconsin, and engaged in a legal practice in partnership with George L. Lee, known as Lee & Walker. He was elected to the Wisconsin State Assembly in 1855 and reelected in 1856, serving in the 8th and 9th Wisconsin legislatures. In 1857, he was elected County Judge of Manitowoc County, defeating incumbent judge Isaac Parrish.

== Civil war service ==
Walker resigned the judgeship in the summer of 1862 to volunteer for service in the American Civil War, responding to President Abraham Lincoln's urgent call for 300,000 volunteers. Walker organized a company of volunteers from Manitowoc and lead them into Camp Bragg—named for Lt. Colonel Edward S. Bragg of the 6th Wisconsin Infantry—at Oshkosh, Wisconsin, headquarters for the newly established 21st Wisconsin Infantry Regiment. In the organization of the regiment, Walker's company was designated Company K and he was commissioned as their captain. The 21st Wisconsin Infantry mustered into service in September 1862 under Colonel Benjamin Sweet.

=== Kentucky and Tennessee campaign (Fall 1862) ===
The 21st Wisconsin was ordered to proceed to Cincinnati for duty in the western theater of the war. They then crossed the Ohio River to Covington, Kentucky, where the regiment was issued their arms and organized into the brigade of General Philip Sheridan. They were there ordered to march quickly to the defense of Louisville and attach to the Division of General Lovell Rousseau, in the Army of the Ohio. The 21st Wisconsin arrived in Louisville just in time to join the march into interior Kentucky that resulted in the Battle of Perryville on October 8, 1862. During the battle, the regiment was erroneously positioned at the far left of the Union lines, and, due to this miscommunication, received fire from both Confederate and Union artillery. Colonel Sweet was wounded in these initial barrages. The Union regiments in front of them broke and fled through their formation and the 21st Wisconsin fell back under heavy fire from the front and sides and reestablished their line among the other regiments of their brigade. They took significant casualties, including Colonel Sweet, who was wounded twice, and Major Frederick Schumacher, who was killed.

Following the battle, Lieutenant Colonel Harrison Carroll Hobart joined the regiment at Lebanon, Kentucky, and took command from the wounded Colonel Sweet. On October 29, the regiment marched to Bowling Green and then to Mitchellville, Tennessee, to defend a railroad supply route. They remained at Mitchellville from November 10 through December 7. Throughout this march and guard duty, the regiment suffered further from exposure, as they had left most of their camp equipment at Louisville before Perryville. They lost more officers and enlisted men through this hardship— including their surgeon Samuel Carolin.

They marched to Nashville, Tennessee, in December and their division was attached to the XIV Corps in William Rosecrans' Army of the Cumberland. They camped at Nashville until the end of December, when they set out to confront Braxton Bragg's Army of Tennessee at Murfreesboro. During the march to Murfreesboro, their column was harassed by Confederate cavalry under the command of Joseph Wheeler. The 21st Wisconsin engaged in skirmishing with the cavalry and inflicted casualties on them, saving a train of supplies in the process. The next day, they participated in the Battle of Stones River and were engaged throughout the day in fighting, though they did not suffer severe casualties. In his report of the battle, General Rousseau praised the 21st Wisconsin and its commander.

Following the battle, the army went into camp around Murfreesboro, where they remained for several months, foraging, drilling, and constructing fortifications. With Colonel Sweet disabled and Major Schumacher dead, during this time Captain Walker was regarded as senior captain in the regiment and acted as a third field officer alongside Lt. Colonel Hobart and adjutant Michael H. Fitch, who would soon be named major.

=== Chickamauga campaign (Summer 1863) ===
In June 1863, the Army of the Cumberland set out for Tullahoma, with the strategic purpose of holding Bragg's attention and preventing him from sending forces to the relief of Vicksburg. XIV Corps, now under the command of General George Henry Thomas, was ordered to probe Hoover's Gap, one of several passes through the Highland Rim, which the Union would need to secure to make its advance. The brigade of Colonel John T. Wilder was sent in advance as mounted infantry and drove the Confederates back, seizing the high ground of the gap and refusing orders to fall back. After Wilder's brigade successfully repulsed several Confederate counterattacks, the 21st Wisconsin was one of several units sent up to reinforce Wilder on the evening of June 24. With the Union in firm possession of Hoover's Gap, the Confederates were forced to evacuate Middle Tennessee and retrench at Chattanooga, forming a new defensive line along the Tennessee River.

In September, the 21st Wisconsin crossed the Tennessee River, along with XIV Corps, as part of Rosecrans's elaborate plan to surround Chattanooga. Bragg, detecting that he was in danger of being encircled, evacuated Chattanooga and retreated to the south into Georgia. At this point, Rosecrans misjudged Bragg's intent; he ordered an aggressive movement of his forces into Georgia in three widely separated columns, not expecting Bragg to turn and counterattack. XIV Corps proceeded to the Dug Gap en route to Lafayette, Georgia, where, unknown to the Union forces, Bragg was preparing to destroy their lead division. Bragg's orders, however, were not carried out by the Confederate officers at the front, and the Union force under James S. Negley detected the danger and withdrew. At this point, the 21st Wisconsin and its division arrived and reinforced Negley's division. The 21st Wisconsin was part of the rearguard which assisted the escape of the two divisions back through Stevens Gap.

On the morning of September 19, after some additional maneuvering, the Battle of Chickamauga commenced as Confederate forces began crossing the Chickamauga Creek. At the time, the 21st Wisconsin was positioned at Missionary Ridge and were sent up with their division to reinforce John T. Croxton's brigade. After some initial success, Bragg sent reinforcements to the site and pushed back the Union division. XIV Corps reformed a defensive line with the 21st Wisconsin near the left edge where they were engaged through the afternoon. On September 20, XIV Corps held its ground on the Union left at Kelly's farm even after the rest of the Union line was routed. At sundown, the Union right was overrun and XIV Corps was compelled to evacuate their position; the 21st Wisconsin, however, did not receive the order and remained in their position until nearly surrounded by the enemy. They attempted to fight their way out of that position, but in the attempt, Lt. Colonel Hobart and about 70 men were captured. Captain Walker lead the remainder of the regiment back to Chattanooga, where they rejoined the rest of the Union Army. They remained at Chattanooga through the Fall and were stationed at nearby Lookout Mountain, Tennessee, through the Winter.

=== Atlanta campaign (Spring–Fall 1864) ===
While the 21st Wisconsin was camped at Lookout Mountain, Captain Walker went back to Wisconsin to recruit new enlistments to replenish the ranks after the losses at Perryville and Chickamauga and returned to camp in March with 139 new volunteers. Lt. Colonel Hobart, in the meantime, had managed to escape captivity and rejoined the regiment. Though Captain Walker would not be officially promoted to major until November, his promotion at that point was made retroactive to May 3, 1864, in acknowledgment of the fact that he was acting as the third field officer of the regiment at this time.

Also during this spring, the Army of the Cumberland had come under the command of General William Tecumseh Sherman as he took overall command of the Union armies in the western theater of the war. In May 1864, Sherman's army set off on his Atlanta campaign and entered a series of battles and marches in rapid succession.

The 21st Wisconsin joined Sherman's flanking maneuver at the Battle of Rocky Face Ridge, which forced the Confederate defenders to retreat to Resaca, Georgia, and joined the assault on Resaca on May 14, which forced the Confederates to retreat once again. At Pumpkin Vine Creek during the Battle of Dallas on May 27, the 21st Wisconsin scattered a band of Confederate skirmishers and occupied a strategic hill, where they were under fire for six days during the siege. The Confederates again retreated from Dallas and were pursued to fortifications at Kennesaw Mountain, near Marietta, Georgia.

On June 27, 1864, the 21st Wisconsin joined the assault on Kennesaw Mountain, with their division assigned to support the attack on Cheatham Hill. After a day of bombardment, the Confederates were again forced to evacuate their position by Sherman's flanking maneuvers.

Following this battle, Colonel Hobart was assigned to command three regiments of the division and Major Fitch was in command of the 21st Wisconsin. They participated in skirmishing with the enemy, pursuing them south to the vicinity of Atlanta. At this point Sherman split his army to facilitate a rapid pursuit to Atlanta while also severing key supply lines; the Confederate army at this time also changed tactics and attempted a counter-offensive against the lead unit, the Army of the Cumberland. The Confederates chose to attack at Peachtree Creek, just after the Union army had crossed and before they had a chance to establish fortifications. During the Battle of Peachtree Creek, the 10th and 21st Wisconsin regiments, under Colonel Hobart, critically drove back a Confederate attack. They were constantly engaged in skirmishing from Peachtree Creek through the Battle of Atlanta. And went into camp at Atlanta on September 8, after the Battle of Jonesborough. The Confederates made attempts to raid at the rear of the Union army and Sherman pursued him briefly to Gaylesville, Alabama, but did not engage in battle—Major Walker was in command of the regiment through this campaign, as Major Fitch had taken leave to get married.

=== Savannah and Carolinas (Fall 1864–Spring 1865) ===
In November, the 21st Wisconsin was consolidated with the remaining members of the 1st and 10th Wisconsin regiments, and the promotions of Hobart, Fitch, and Walker were formalized. Hobart was assigned command of the brigade, and Fitch remained in command of the 21st Wisconsin. On November 12, 1864, they set out with XIV Corps on Sherman's Savannah Campaign (his "March to the Sea"). They passed the burning cities of Marietta and Atlanta on November 14 and 15, respectively, heading east. They destroyed railroads and bridges but did not encounter an enemy army. They joined the siege of Savannah in December, and following the Confederate evacuation, occupied the city.

At this point, Lt. Colonel Fitch was designated to command three regiments of the battalion under Colonel Hobart, and Major Walker was in command of the 21st Wisconsin for the remainder of the war. XIV Corps next turned north into South Carolina, participating in the torching and destruction in that state on their route north of Columbia, South Carolina. They camped at Fayetteville, North Carolina, on March 11, 1865. On March 19, 1865, the 21st Wisconsin participated in their last fighting of the war at the Battle of Bentonville. They went into camp at Goldsboro, North Carolina, on March 23, and, on April 13, they were the first brigade to enter the city of Raleigh, North Carolina.

With the war ended, they marched north through Virginia and joined the Grand Review of the Armies in Washington, D.C., in May. They returned home to Milwaukee on June 17, 1865, where the regiment was disbanded.

== Postbellum years ==
After the war, Walker returned to his law practice, but due to poor health soon retired to a farm in Manitowoc Rapids, Wisconsin. In the 1870s, he served two years on the Manitowoc County Board, representing Manitowoc Rapids, and was chairman of the county board in 1876.

He suffered a series of paralytic strokes over the course of his last years, and died in 1877 at his home in Manitowoc Rapids.

== Personal life and family ==
Walker was married twice. He married Ione Carpenter in September 1865, after returning from the war. But she died less than a year later. In 1870, he married Elizabeth "Libbie" Rouan (née Homer), of Sheboygan, with whom he had two sons.

Wisconsin State Assembly
Preceded by James Bennett	Member of the Wisconsin State Assembly from the Manitowoc 1st district January 1, 1856 – January 1, 1858	Succeeded by Henry C. Hamilton
Legal offices
Preceded by Isaac Parrish	County Judge of Manitowoc County, Wisconsin; January 1, 1858 – Summer 1862	Succeeded by Henry S. Pierpont
