= Gale Robbins =

American actress and singer (1921–1980)

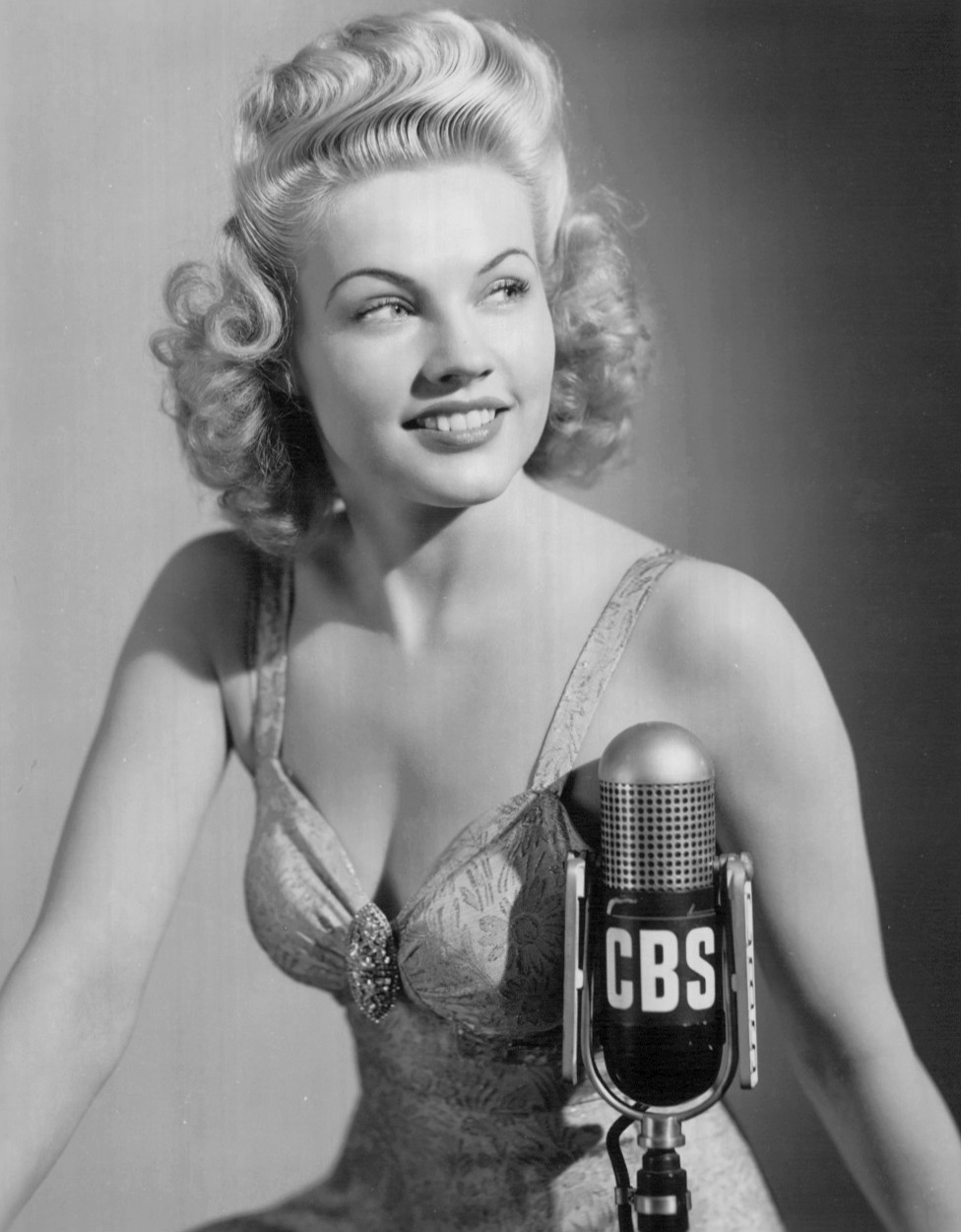
- Robbins in 1941
- Born: Betty Gale Robbins or Betty Gale Murphy; May 7, 1921; Chicago, Illinois, U.S. or Mitchell, Indiana, U.S.
- Died: February 18, 1980 (aged 58); Tarzana, California, U.S.
- Education: Lucy Flower High School
- Occupations: Actress; singer
- Years active: 1944–1966
- Known for: Calamity Jane
- Spouse: Robert Wesley Olson (m. 1946; died 1967)
- Children: 2
- Awards: Hollywood Walk of Fame

Gale Robbins (born Betty Gale Robbins or Betty Gale Murphy, May 7, 1921 – February 18, 1980) was an American actress and singer.

== Early years ==
Born in Chicago, Illinois, although one source claims she was born in Mitchell, Indiana and her family moved to Chicago "when she was very young"; she graduated from Lucy Flower High School in June 1939.

== Modeling ==
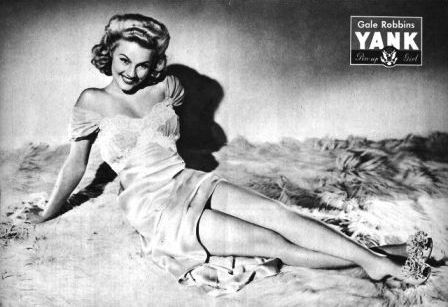
Pin-up photo of Robbins for Yank, the Army Weekly in 1944

Robbins "attended the Vera Jones Modeling School and posed for many magazine covers and ads." A 1941 newspaper article described her as "the famous model whose face has appeared on the covers of many leading magazines, and whose eyes and teeth are the trademarks respectively of Murine and Iodent."

== Singing ==
In 1939, Robbins was a singer in the stage show at the Hotel Sherman's College Inn in Chicago, Illinois. She apparently changed her stage name at that time. An article in the August 6, 1939, issue of the Chicago Tribune reported: "Betty Robbins, Chicago singer who joined the show recently, holds over for the new program, under the name Gale Robbins. Gale is her middle name."

Robbins sang with the Phil Levant band in 1940, and in 1941, she sang with Jan Garber. Also in 1941, she recorded Jim (one side of RCA Victor 27580) with Art Jarrett. Beginning in June 1942, Robbins sang on The Ben Bernie War Workers' Program, which was broadcast three nights a week on CBS radio. (Walter Winchell wrote in his syndicated newspaper column that Robbins was "the best part of Ben Bernie's act.") On August 14, 1942, she was a featured vocalist on a revue headlined by Fred Brady and broadcast over WABC. Also in 1942, she was one of four female singers on the staff at WBBM radio in Chicago, Illinois. In 1945, she sang on Ice Box Follies on ABC, and during the 1945–1946 season, she was a vocalist on The Hoagy Carmichael Show on NBC.

In 1949, Robbins sang as part of Dennis Day's Vaudeville show in Boston, prompting a reviewer for the trade publication Billboard to write: "The acts include Gale Robbins, as fine a vocalist as the town has seen in ages. She's pretty, has a real voice and a personality which never flags." That same year, she was the female lead in the musical revue A La Carte at the El Capitan Theater in Hollywood, California. A reviewer wrote in Billboard, "Song-wise, Gale Robbins and Bill Shirley are admirably suited to their lead parts, scoring vocally and in stage presence."

In September 1957, Robbins signed with Vik Records and made her first recordings for that label.

== Film ==
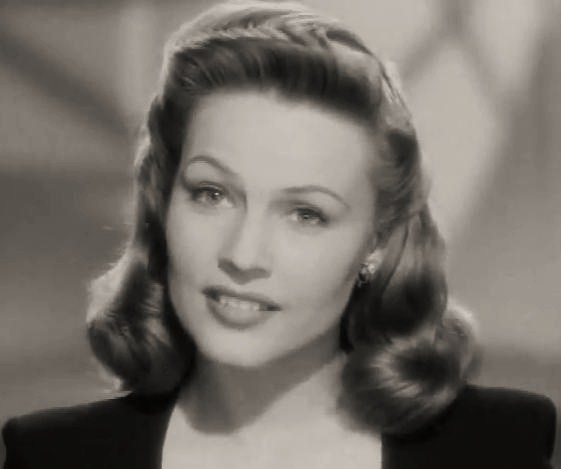
In My Dear Secretary (1948)

Robbins signed a contract with 20th Century Fox late in 1942. She made her film debut in In the Meantime, Darling in 1944. She appeared in several films, such as Calamity Jane and My Dear Secretary, and briefly sang parts of two songs in The Barkleys of Broadway, playing Shirlene May, the potential understudy to Ginger Rogers' character. Robbins sang another song, "All Alone Monday," in another Fred Astaire vehicle, Three Little Words (1950).

== Television ==
Robbins entertained at many military bases with a troupe led by Bob Hope. She later focused on television, including being a regular on Pantomime Quiz on KTTV in Los Angeles, California, in 1949. She was hostess of Hollywood House from 1949 to 1950. She released the album I'm a Dreamer, backed by Eddie Cano and his orchestra, in 1958. She made three guest appearances on The Bob Cummings Show between 1955 and 1958. Gale appeared on The Untouchables, in the episode "The Antidote." She also had roles in such popular series as Gunsmoke, ‘’Trackdown’’, Perry Mason, 77 Sunset Strip and Mister Ed.

In 1955, Robbins signed a contract with Screen Gems for "a number of Damon Runyon Theater segments." Billboard reported that it was "the first time that the Columbia subsidiary has put a performer under contract for more than a single pic."

== Recognition ==
Robbins has a star on the Hollywood Walk of Fame in the category of motion pictures. Her star is located at 6510 Hollywood Boulevard.

== Personal life ==
Robbins married her high school sweetheart, Robert Olson, November 8, 1943, when he was in the Air Force. The couple remained married until Olson's death in 1968, and had two daughters, Victoria and Cynthia.

== Death ==
Robbins died of lung cancer February 18, 1980, in Tarzana, California, at the age of 58.

== Partial filmography ==
- In the Meantime, Darling (1944)
- Mr. Hex (1946)
- Race Street (1948)
- My Dear Secretary (1948)
- The Barkleys of Broadway (1949)
- Oh, You Beautiful Doll (1949)
- Three Little Words (1950)
- The Fuller Brush Girl (1950)
- Between Midnight and Dawn (1950)
- Strictly Dishonorable (1951)
- The Belle of New York (1952)
- The Brigand (1953)
- Calamity Jane (1953)
- The Girl in the Red Velvet Swing (1955)
- Double Jeopardy (1955)
- Gunsmoke in Tucson (1958)
- Quantrill's Raiders (1958)

== Partial discography ==
- This Can't Be the End of Me/Riverman (1956 Era 1022)
- I'm a Dreamer album (1958 Vik LX 1128)

== See also ==
- Pin-ups of Yank, the Army Weekly
