= Celia Parker Woolley =

American novelist

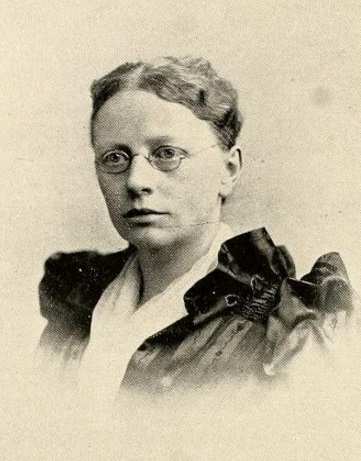
- Woolley, circa 1897.
- Born: Celia Parker; June 14, 1848; Toledo, Ohio
- Died: March 9, 1918 (aged 69); Chicago, Illinois

Celia Parker Woolley (June 14, 1848 – March 9, 1918) was an American novelist, Unitarian minister and social reformer. She also served as a president of the Chicago Woman's Club and the founder of the Frederick Douglass Woman's Club.

== Biography ==
=== Early life ===
Born Celia Parker on June 14, 1848, in Toledo, Ohio, She moved to Coldwater, Michigan at a young age. Parker's parents were both educated, and her father was a respected architect. She graduated from Coldwater Female Seminary in 1866 or 1867, and in 1868, she was married to dentist J. H. Woolley. In 1876 the couple moved to Chicago. They had one child who died in adolescence.

== Ministry and beliefs ==
Woolley began studies for the ministry and became pastor of the Unitarian Church of Geneva, Illinois from 1893–1896, being ordained in 1894. As a pastor, she was hailed for not shying away from speaking about topical issues of the time, and is credited with getting people interested in the faith with her popular sermons. She wrote for prominent Unitarian and Christian publications, such as The Christian Register, based in Boston; Unity, a Unitarian publication in Chicago; and The Open Court, a journal based in Chicago combining science and religion. In Woolley's article in The Open Court, she discusses the success of the Congress of Liberal Religious Societies, an organization of which she was a vice-president alongside Susan B. Anthony and other notable figures. Woolley describes the congress as a gathering of liberal religions to increase religious fellowship. She was then pastor of the Independent Liberal Church, Chicago, 1896–98.

== Activism ==
Woolley cultivated close relationships with many prominent Chicago figures of the time, including Fannie Barrier Williams, a Black unitarian civil rights activist and educator; Jenkin Lloyd Jones, a popular unitarian minister and Frank Lloyd Wright's uncle; Ida B. Wells, an anti-lynching journalist and activist, and many more. She was active in the Chicago Woman's Club from the time she moved to Chicago in 1876, where she would serve as president for three years, from 1888 to 1890. The Chicago Woman's Club, established in 1876, was created to discuss literature, social reform, art, and education. As the years passed, its approach became more hands-on, influencing many in Chicago. Fannie Barrier Williams became the first Black member of the club in 1896 with the help of Woolley's intense lobbying and Jenkin Lloyd Jones' support. In 1904, she moved with her husband to Chicago's South Side to do social work, because she was concerned with issues of racism and human rights. In 1904 she established the Frederick Douglass Center in order to promote opportunities for blacks and better interracial relationships and cooperation. In 1906, she founded the Frederick Douglass Woman's Club, one of the few interracial women's clubs in Chicago. Mrs. George W. Plummer, a white woman, served as the president, and Ida B. Wells as vice president. Louis George Gregory spoke there in April and August 1911, and was one of the keynote speakers of the 1912 NAACP conference in Chicago, and hosted ʻAbdu'l-Bahá, then leader of the Bahá'í Faith, at the Center in September during his journeys in the West.

She was active as a lecturer and in the work of women's clubs. Some of this work emphasized literature and related biography. George Eliot and Robert Browning were two interests.

She died in Chicago's South Side on March 9, 1918.

== Selected works ==
- Love and Theology, novel (1887; republished as Rachel Armstrong, or, Love and Theology)
- A Girl Graduate, novel (1889)
- Roger Hunt, novel (1893)
- The Western Slope, autobiographical and historical (1903)
