= Frederick Douglass Woman's Club =

Women's club in Chicago, Illinois, US

The Frederick Douglass Woman's Club was formed in Chicago, Illinois, in 1906. It was one of the first women's clubs in Chicago to promote suffrage. It was notable because it was one of the few interracial women's clubs in Chicago.

== History ==
The club was founded in 1906 by Celia Parker Woolley, a white Unitarian minister and novelist. Most of the members of the club were middle-class, and it was an interracial club. The club met weekly, hosting speakers who discussed political events of the day, including votes for women. Speakers included Elia W. Peattie, G. M. Faulkner of Liberia College, and Elmira Springer. Ida B. Wells served as vice president of the club.

The club was housed at the Frederick Douglass Center, a settlement house in Chicago founded by Woolley and Wells, whose purpose was to foster interracial cooperation between African Americans and whites. The club was only one aspect of the settlement house work focused on connecting middle-class black and white women. The influential black activist Fannie Barrier Williams supported the work of the center and the club, believing that interracial activism could both bring women's suffrage and improve the lives of black women and girls in Chicago.

Because of social pressure from the Frederick Douglass Woman's Club, the Chicago Political League, another local woman's club extended their membership to African-American women.

== See also ==
- Woman's club movement
- Ida B. Wells
- Fannie Barrier Williams
