= Mary L. Langworthy =

American lecturer and executive (1872–1949)

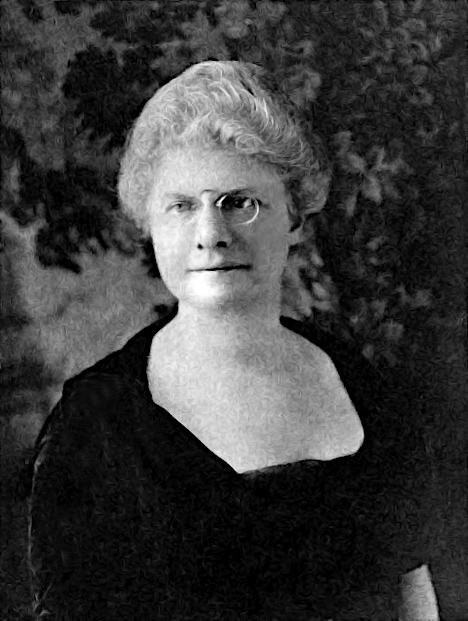
- Born: Mary Ann Lewis; March 31, 1872; Alfred, New York, U.S.
- Died: January 15, 1949 (aged 76); Illinois
- Education: Alfred College
- Occupations: dramatic coach; writer; lecturer; clubwoman; civic leader
- Spouse: Benjamin Franklin Langworthy (m. 1897)

Mary L. Langworthy (née, Lewis; March 31, 1872 – January 15, 1949) was an American dramatic coach, writer, lecturer, clubwoman, and civic leader. She lived in Chicago, Illinois, where she wrote and directed patriotic and educational pageants. She also served in an executive capacity for many organizations, including president of the Illinois Congress of Mothers and Parent–teacher association (beginning in 1914), and president of the Chicago Woman's Club (1924-25).

== Early life and education ==
Mary Ann Lewis was born in Alfred, New York, on March 31, 1872, the daughter of Abram Herbert and Augusta Melissa (Johnson) Lewis. The first American Lewis came from England and settled in Rhode Island. Her father was Abram Herbert Lewis, a professor of church history, and he was descended from a long line of Rhode Island Seventh Day Baptists. Through her mother, Langworthy descended from John Tanner, of pioneer stock, who came from England to Rhode Island.

Langworthy grew up with a mingled heritage. Though deeply grounded in religious faith, she felt no special religious mission. Though furnished with natural eloquence, she felt no impulse to use it for sectarian causes. Her natural poetry blended with her natural practicality to make her a teacher of literature, and especially dramatic literature.

She was educated in the district school of Alfred, New York, attending later the Plainfield Ladies’ Seminary, Plainfield, New Jersey, where she received a teachers' certificate. After this, Langworthy did special work at Alfred College, Alfred, New York, in the study of English literature and languages. In 1894, she was in New York City at the Delsarte School of Expression under Eva Alberti for a course in dramatic expression.

== Career ==
On October 25, 1897, she married Benjamin Franklin Langworthy (1871-1952), an attorney of Chicago. They had two daughters, Frances Lewis and Marigold Lockhart. The family resided in Chicago.

Langworthy was a dramatic coach and instructor in dramatics. She also wrote and directed patriotic and educational pageants. During the period of 1913-16, she wrote and directed the pageants for Independence Day, that were held in River Forest, Illinois. Other pageants included "Plantation Memories", "As the Child Learns", and "The Soul of Man". These were presented in the 1910s at Lewis Institute (now Illinois Institute of Technology), the Chicago Auditorium, and elsewhere. In 1921, she published the libretto for Elijah, a religious opera in six scenes, being a dramatization of Mendelssohn's oratorio.

As time passed, she became more interested in the lives of her pupils rather than in their dramatic performances. In Chicago, Langworthy saw the dangers threatening women in an industrial age. Though always a suffragist, as her parents had been before her, Langworthy was less concerned with votes for women than with womanliness for women. She began to lecture young women about life. She became identified with associations of teachers and parents for the preservation of the highest standards. As a lecturer, Langworthy was especially successful in public talks to young women.

During the World War I, she served as Chair of Girls’ Work in the Illinois Division of the Council of National Defense; Chair, Woman’s Department of YWCA and the Overseas Service, Great Lake Division. She founded and directed "The Jolly Tar", a home club for sailors where everything was free, located near the Great Lakes Training Station.

After the war, Langworthy filled similar positions of responsibility and service. These included serving as president of the Chicago Woman's Club (1924-25). She was the chair of the Department of Education of the National Congress of Parents and Teachers, and later, vice-president of the National Congress. She was the chair of girls' work in the Chicago Community Service; and a trustee of the village of Winnetka, Illinois. Langworthy served as director, Illinois League of Women Voters; vice-president, Cook County, Illinois School of Nursing; and secretary, Juvenile Protective Association. She was also a member of the Daughters of the American Revolution (DAR) George Rogers Clark Chapter.

In July 1924, Langworthy went with her husband to England to attend the meeting of the American Bar Association, held in London at the invitation of the English and Canadian Bar. After three weeks in England and Wales, they visited Holland, Belgium, Austria, Czechoslovakia, Hungary, the Tyrol, Italy, Switzerland, France and back to England, where a part of the pleasure for Mrs. Langworthy was a close observance of the functioning of these countries in the lines of sanitation, recreation, child protection and development, civic art and music, policing, housing, foods, and justice.

== Personal life ==
An effort to unite spiritual ideals with civic and practical life characterized her sisters and brother. An elder sister, a nurse, married William Logie Russell, head of the psychopathic branch of the New York Hospital. Another elder sister married a chemist, James Henry Parsons. Her widowed sister, Louise Lewis Kimball, was an educator; her younger sister, Mrs. Bennet Spencer, a lecturer. Her brother, Edwin Herbert Lewis, served as Dean of the faculty of Lewis Institute, and wrote romances that dealt with the relations of modern science and modern life.

In religion, Langworthy was affiliated with Seventh Day Baptists. In politics, she was a Republican.

Mary Ann Lewis Langworthy died January 15, 1949.

== Selected works ==
=== Pageants, written between 1910 and 1924 ===
- "The Hall and the Forga (educational)
- "Plantation Memories" (musical)
- "Independence Day" (patriotic)
- "As the Child Learns" (educational)
- "The Soul of Man" (religious)

=== Opera ===
- Elijah, a religious opera in 6 scenes, being a dramatization of Mendelssohn's oratorio (libretto only, 1921)
