= Sarah Hackett Stevenson =

American physician (1841–1909)

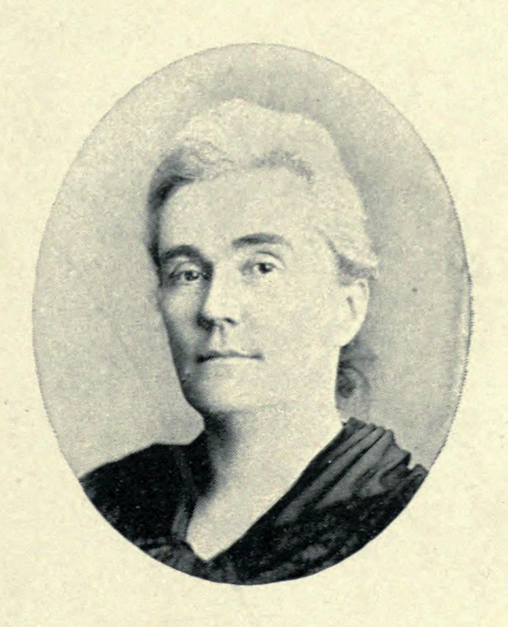
- Born: Sarah Ann Hackett Stevenson; February 2, 1841; Buffalo Grove, Illinois
- Died: August 14, 1909 (aged 68)
- Education: Mount Carroll Seminary; State Normal College; Woman's Hospital Medical College
- Occupation: Physician

Sarah Ann Hackett Stevenson (February 2, 1841 – August 14, 1909) was an American physician in Illinois, and the first female member of the American Medical Association (AMA), as an Illinois State Medical Society delegate in 1876. She was a leader and advocate for the emancipation of women and for the equal treatment of men and women.

== Early life and education ==
Stevenson was born in Buffalo Grove, (now Polo), in Ogle County, Illinois. She was one of seven children and the younger of two daughters. Her mother, Sarah T. Hackett, daughter of Captain Simon Hackett, was born into a prominent Philadelphia family. Her father, John D. Stevenson, was the eldest son of Ann (Davis) and Charles Stevenson, one of the earliest settlers of Ogle County. She attended Mount Carroll Seminary (which later became Shimer College) and State Normal College, in Bloomington, Illinois (now Illinois State Normal University) where she graduated with honors as a teacher in 1863. She taught for four years in public schools in Bloomington, Mount Morris and Sterling, Illinois where she also served as principal. She later moved to Chicago to study anatomy and physiology at Woman's Hospital Medical College, in Chicago, where she graduated with highest honors in 1874, having in the meantime also spent a year in England studying at South Kensington Science School in London under Thomas Huxley. While in England she stayed with Emily Faithfull, who would later visit her in Chicago. She pursued postgraduate study abroad at hospitals in London and Dublin, studying under Huxley and Charles Darwin. While in Europe, she was appointed a delegate to the Sanitary Conference in Vienna in 1874 by Illinois Governor John Beveridge.

== Career ==
Stevenson's medical career began in Chicago where from 1875 to 1880 she was physiology chair at the Woman's Hospital Medical College. During this time, she was elected to membership in the Illinois State Medical Society. In 1875, she was appointed head of the society's committee on progress in physiology. In 1876, as an alternate delegate to the American Medical Association convention in Philadelphia, she fulfilled the role of delegate when the appointee was unable to fulfill his attend. This made her the first woman member. Her participation in the AMA continued as she served as delegate for three more conventions and, in 1878, chaired an AMA special committee for advancing physical sciences. In 1879, she presented a paper on the sympathetic nervous system.

== Influence ==
She was the first of many: the first woman member of the American Medical Association (AMA), the first woman appointed on the State Board of Health, and the first woman to be on staff at the Cook County Hospital. She was a strong advocate for the emancipation of woman. Dr. Stevenson opted to resign from her position at the Woman's Medical College because she believed the segregation of sexes in medical school was no longer needed. In 1875, she took up a professorship at the Women's Hospital Medical College, which later became part of Northwestern University but was closed in 1892. In 1876, attending the AMA convention as a delegate of the Illinois State Medical Society, she was accepted without controversy as the AMA's first female member. In 1880 she co-founded the Illinois Training School for Nurses together with Lucy Flower. She retired in 1903.

Dr. Stevenson was listed as a consulting physician at Bellevue Place, sanitarium and rest home in Batavia, Illinois.

In 1893, Stevenson proposed to the Chicago Woman's Club to create a safe home for women and children without funds and in need of shelter. Her proposal was accepted by many and followed by donations from various individuals and other clubs; the Woman's Model Lodging House was then opened to the public as a result of Stevenson's plea to help those in need. There was a charge of fifteen cents per night, and those who were unable pay were given work to pay for their lodging.

== Writings ==
- Boys and Girls in Biology (1875)
  - A high school textbook based on Thomas Huxley's lectures. Stevenson states that oftentimes science is taught to others using complex terminology rendering it unappealing and difficult to understand. This work was written in hopes of educating young boys and girls about biology in an interesting and simplistic way.
- The Physiology of Women (1880)
  - The purpose of this book was to educate women about themselves. There are five chapters within the book that talk about the physiology and anatomy of women, mental health, marriage, pregnancy, motherhood, and much more.
- Wife and Mother: Or, Information for Every Woman (1888)
  - A book with several chapters including what to expect during and after pregnancy.
