= Milan H. Sessions =

American politician (1821–1898)

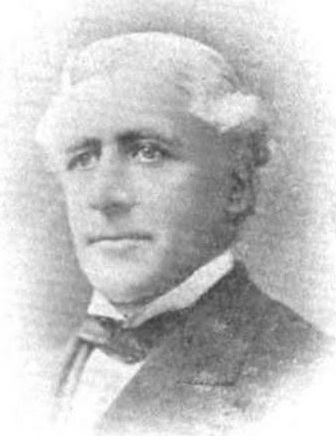
- From 1898's Norwich University: Her History, Her Graduates, Her Roll of Honor

5th Speaker of the Nebraska House of Representatives
- In office January 1873 – January 1875
- Preceded by: George W. Collins
- Succeeded by: Edward S. Towle

Member of the Nebraska House of Representatives
- In office January 1883 – January 1885 Serving with Charles O. Whedon, J. W. Worl, M. H. Westcott, H. Wissenburg, & Allen W. Field
- Preceded by: Simon C. Ayer
- Succeeded by: Allen W. Field, J. B. Wright, William Brandt Jr., H. S. Liesveldt, J. C. Johnston, & S. W. Burnham
- Constituency: 30th House district
- In office January 1879 – January 1881 Serving with S. G. Owen, W. W. Carder, & T. R. Burling
- Preceded by: District established
- Succeeded by: Charles O. Whedon, N. T. McClun, N. C. Abbott, & Robert B. Graham
- Constituency: 7th House district
- In office January 1873 – January 1875
- Preceded by: District established
- Succeeded by: Thomas C. Chapman
- Constituency: Gage–Johnson–Lancaster–Pawnee–Saunders district

Member of the Wisconsin State Assembly from the Waupaca County district
- In office January 1869 – January 1870
- Preceded by: Jarvis W. Carter
- Succeeded by: Albert V. Balch

Member of the Wisconsin Senate from the 27th district
- In office January 1865 – January 1867
- Preceded by: Alexander S. McDill
- Succeeded by: Edward L. Browne

Personal details
- Born: December 4, 1821 Randolph, Vermont, U.S.
- Died: April 18, 1898 (aged 76) Minneapolis, Minnesota, U.S.
- Resting place: Lakewood Cemetery, Minneapolis
- Party: Republican
- Spouses: Caroline Cleveland Chandler (m. 1847; died 1857); Caroline Carrie Thorne (m. 1866; died 1868); Jane E. Josyslin (m. 1878)
- Children: with Caroline Chandler; John Hebard Sessions^{(b. 1848; died 1936)}; Caroline Wallace Sessions^{(b. 1852; died 1938)}; Mary Willis Sessions^{(b. 1854)}; with Caroline Thorne; Alice Thorne (Boutelle)^{(b. 1868; died 1925)}

Military service
- Allegiance: United States
- Branch/service: United States Volunteers (Union Army)
- Years of service: 1862–1863
- Rank: Captain, USV
- Unit: 21st Reg. Wis. Vol. Infantry
- Battles/wars: American Civil War

Milan Hibbard Sessions (December 4, 1821 – April 18, 1898) was an American lawyer, Republican politician, and pioneer of Wisconsin and Nebraska. He served in the Wisconsin Senate, Wisconsin State Assembly, and Nebraska House of Representatives, and was speaker of the Nebraska House of Representatives during the 1873 session. Earlier in life, he served as a Union Army officer in the American Civil War.

== Biography ==
Milan Hebard Sessions was born on December 4, 1821, in Randolph, Vermont. In 1847, he married Caroline C. Chandler. They had three children before she died in 1857. Sessions moved to Waupaca, Wisconsin, in 1855. During the American Civil War, he served with the 21st Wisconsin Infantry Regiment of the Union Army with the rank of captain. He married Elizabeth Wilson in 1866. They had one daughter before she died in 1868. Sessions then moved to Lincoln, Nebraska, in 1871. In 1878, he married Jane E. Josyslin.

== Career ==
Sessions was State's Attorney of Washington County, Vermont, from 1853 to 1854. He was District Attorney of Waupaca County, Wisconsin, from 1860 to 1861. Later, Sessions was a member of the Wisconsin Senate and of the Wisconsin State Assembly. In 1871, he was defeated for the Senate by his law partner, Myron Reed. He was a member of the Nebraska House of Representatives in 1873 and 1879, serving as Speaker of the House of Representatives during his second term.

Sessions moved to Minneapolis, Minnesota, in 1881 and practiced law. He died of pneumonia at the home of his son in Minneapolis on April 18, 1898, and was buried at Lakewood Cemetery in Minneapolis.
