= Mary Emma Holmes =

American reformer, suffragist, and educator

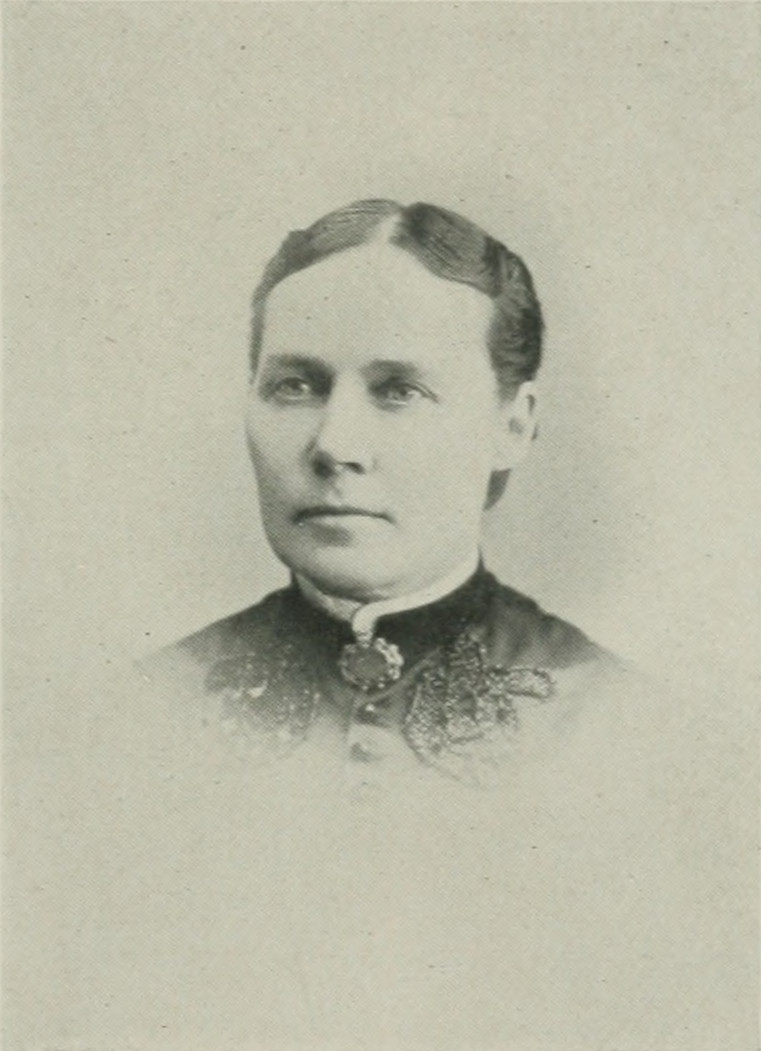
- "A Woman of the Century"
- Born: Mary Emma Smith; August 3, 1839; Peoria County, Illinois, U.S.
- Died: May 18, 1937 (aged 97); Chicago, Illinois, U.S.
- Other names: Mrs. Mary E. Holmes
- Occupations: reformer; suffragist; educator
- Spouse: David Edward Holmes (m. 1865; died 1907)

Mary Emma Holmes (née, Smith; August 3, 1839 – May 18, 1937) was an American reformer, suffragist, and educator. She was the president of the Equal Suffrage Association of Illinois, and she represented the National American Suffrage Association in the World's Columbian Exposition at Chicago in 1893. Holmes was a member of the Chicago Woman's Club, and was the chair of the Chicago YWCA's travelers' aid department, which had for its object the protection of girls at the region's depots.

== Early life and education ==
Mary Emma Smith was born on a farm in Peoria County, Illinois, August 3, 1839. She is descended from Puritan stock. Her father, Capt. Ira Smith, was born in Hampden, Maine, 5th January, 1806. Her mother, Sarah Jenkins Smith, was a native of Thomaston, Maine, and was born 20th November, 1813. Her father, a man of means, enlisted in a man-of-war at the age of 17. It was the custom, in those days, to deal out grog daily to the sailors. This troubled him, and he attempted to give away his allowance or to throw it overboard, but was stopped by the officer in charge. He appealed to the captain, and was allowed to receive US$2.50 per month instead of the rum. Mr. Smith soon became the master of a merchant ship. He hung out his sign, which said that he would not allow grog except in cases of sickness, and wanted only men who would be willing to go without it. His vessel was the first one that sailed out of Boston with temperance regulations. His men were so faithful that other captains soon followed his example. This reformatory spirit was born in his daughter.

Holmes was educated in Peoria, Illinois, where she lived during her girlhood.

== Career ==
She was a teacher in the Peoria public schools for six years. She taught in the poorest part of the city, from choice, and did missionary work at the same time.

On September 21, 1865, she married Rev. David Edward Holmes (1832-1907), and moved to his field of labor in Berlin, Wisconsin. The failure of her husband's health during the first year of their married life made a change of business necessary, and both Rev. and Mrs. Holmes taught in the Berlin high school for six years. They were chosen members of the faculty of the Normal School in Oshkosh, Wisconsin (now, University of Wisconsin–Oshkosh), but soon after they began their work, but another health failure on the part of her husband made a change to a business life a necessity.

Within a year, they removed to Galva, Illinois, where her husband became successful as a lumber merchant, Mrs. Holmes keeping the books for several years. They had one son, Edward, born in 1874, and an adopted daughter, Emma Holland.

Although Holmes was always a reformer, for many years, she was also very involved in public work. She was for several years president of the county societies for temperance and suffrage. Then she was superintendent of the franchise department for the Illinois Woman's Christian Temperance Union (W.C.T.U.) for several years. These positions she resigned after she became president of the Equal Suffrage Association of Illinois. After being president of the State five years, she resigned to rest, but at the end of one year of rest, she again accepted the presidency in the annual meeting in November, 1890. By virtue of this office, she was also vice-president of the National American Suffrage Association. Holmes excelled in executive ability and as a presiding officer. She was the treasurer of a fund contributed to obtain a marble portrait bust of Susan B. Anthony, to be exhibited in the World's Fair, in Chicago, in 1893. Holmes was also a member of the "government reform" committee of the woman's branch of the World's Congress Auxiliary, and also represented the National American Suffrage Association in the World's Fair as the Committee from Illinois.

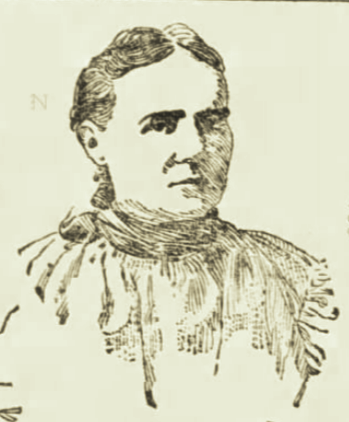
1895

In 1894, she became affiliated with the Chicago Woman's Club and chaired the school for prisoners at the Cook County jail. The following year, Mr. Holmes became paralyzed after a train accident, and Mrs. Holmes turned her focus to her homelife, though in December of that year, she served as one of three judges in the Chicago Tribune's contest, "How a Woman Can Embark in Business on a Capital of $100".

Widowed in 1907, Holmes became very active in clubwork. She wrote a good deal in a local way, and also for educational journals, all through her active life.

She belonged to the liberal wing of the Congregational Church and was an active member, having been clerk in the Galva church for many years. She taught a Sunday-school class of 100 men and women and a society of 250 children, called "Careful Builders." A free public library in her own home was provided for these charges.

== Death ==
Mary Emma Smith Holmes died in Chicago, May 18, 1937. (Note: Herringshaw (1914) mistakenly records Mary Emma Holmes' date and place of death as February 13, 1906, Rockford, Illinois, confusing this subject with Mary Emilie Holmes.)
