= Double Jeopardy (1955 film) =

1955 American film by R. G. Springsteen

- Directed by: R. G. Springsteen
- Written by: Don Martin
- Produced by: Rudy Ralston
- Starring: Rod Cameron; Gale Robbins; Allison Hayes
- Cinematography: John L. Russell
- Edited by: Cliff Bell Sr.
- Music by: R. Dale Butts
- Production company: Republic Pictures
- Distributed by: Republic Pictures
- Release date: June 23, 1955
- Running time: 70 minutes
- Country: United States
- Language: English

Double Jeopardy is an American crime film directed by R. G. Springsteen and starring Rod Cameron, Gale Robbins and Allison Hayes. It is also known by the alternative title of Crooked Ring.

The film's art direction was by Carroll Clark.

== Plot ==
Lawyer Marc Hill helps clear the name of his girlfriend's father who is accused of murdering a man who was blackmailing him.

== Cast ==
- Rod Cameron as Marc Hill
- Gale Robbins as Marge Baggott
- Allison Hayes as Barbara Devery
- Jack Kelly as Jeff Calder
- John Litel as Emmett Devery
- Robert Armstrong as Sam Baggott
- John Gallaudet as Police Lt. Freid
- Robert Nelson as Police Sgt. McNulty
- Minerva Urecal as Mrs. Kreesy
- Tom Powers as Harry Sheldon
- Dick Elliott as Happy Harry
- Fern Hall as Miss Webster
- Gay Gallegher as Miss Hunter
- Howard Price as Ambulance Attendant
- Rudy Robles as Frank
- Robert Shayne as Mr. Ross

== See also ==
- List of American films of 1955

== Bibliography ==
- Spicer, Andrew. Historical Dictionary of Film Noir. Scarecrow Press, 2010.
