= Samuel Laing Williams =

American lawyer (1857–1921)

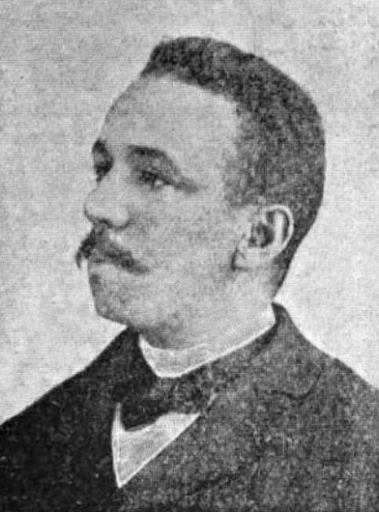
Photograph portrait of Samuel Laing Williams, 1903.

Samuel Laing Williams (January 10, 1857 – December 21, 1921) was an American lawyer and community leader. He was the first African American to graduate from the Law School of the George Washington University, then called Columbian University, in Washington, D.C. Founded in 1821 as Columbian College, Columbian University briefly admitted African Americans to its law program some time between 1865 and about 1890. Williams may have been the first African American admitted to any GW program when he applied in 1882; he experienced discrimination from his white peers but was said to have eventually won their respect, along with that of the faculty, who awarded him a top law thesis prize. He earned his LL.B. from Columbian University in 1884 while also working at the United States Pension office. He was admitted to the District of Columbia Bar on June 18, 1885, then went on to earn his LL.M. from Columbian University's graduate law program in 1885.

Out of a student body of just over 180 law students, only three other African Americans are known to have attended Columbian University Law School during this time: Robert Bruce Bagby from Indiana, Theodore H. Greene from Mississippi, and George Langhorne Pryor from Virginia, who were all enrolled as seniors in 1886. At least one other African American, William Henry Harrison Hart, is known to have been rejected admission in 1885. This window of admissions of African Americans soon closed, and George Washington University did not drop its racial exclusion policies until 1954, after George Washington University Law School merged with National University Law School, which had already desegregated.

== Biography ==
Samuel Laing Williams was born in Savannah, Georgia, between 1854 and 1859, the child of an African-American woman known only as Nancy, and an unknown white Englishman. One obituary gives his birth date as January 10, 1857. Little is known of his early life, but by 1870, he was living in Chicago with David and Ann Laing, both from England; listed on the census as "Samuel Williams" (he included the name "Laing" later), he moved with them to Columbiaville, Michigan, where David Laing opened an iron foundry. Williams enrolled in the University of Michigan in 1877 and graduated in 1881 with an A.B. degree. For a short time, he moved to Greensboro, Alabama, to teach in the Tullibody Academy, a private school for African-American boys. He then moved to Washington, D.C., where he worked as an adjudicator in the United States Pension Office, and soon after, entered Columbian University Law School.

While in law school, he met Frances "Fannie" Barrier (1855–1944), an African-American teacher then in Washington, D.C., who went on to work as a social activist, clubwoman, lecturer, and journalist working for social justice, civil liberties, education, and employment opportunities, especially for black women. Williams moved back to Chicago in 1885, but continued to visit Barrier in Washington. The two were married at her parents' home in Brockport, New York, on April 20, 1887, celebrated with receptions in Washington, and then moved to Chicago, where they became leaders in the African-American community. They were friends and associates of black activists representing a range of ideologies, including Frederick Douglass and Booker T. Washington, and with white reformers, including Jane Addams, Mary McDowell, and Philip D. Armour, whom they convinced to fund the founding of Provident Hospital, which had a biracial staff and clientele and a nursing school for African Americans.

Williams worked as a lawyer for the Chicago NAACP and served as its Vice President in 1914. He served as Assistant U.S. District Attorney in Chicago during the Roosevelt and Taft administrations, and was one of the best known African-American lawyers in the country and regarded by many as a brilliant orator. He died in Chicago on December 21, 1921.
