= Norman Barton Wood =

American writer, lecturer, minister (1857–1933)

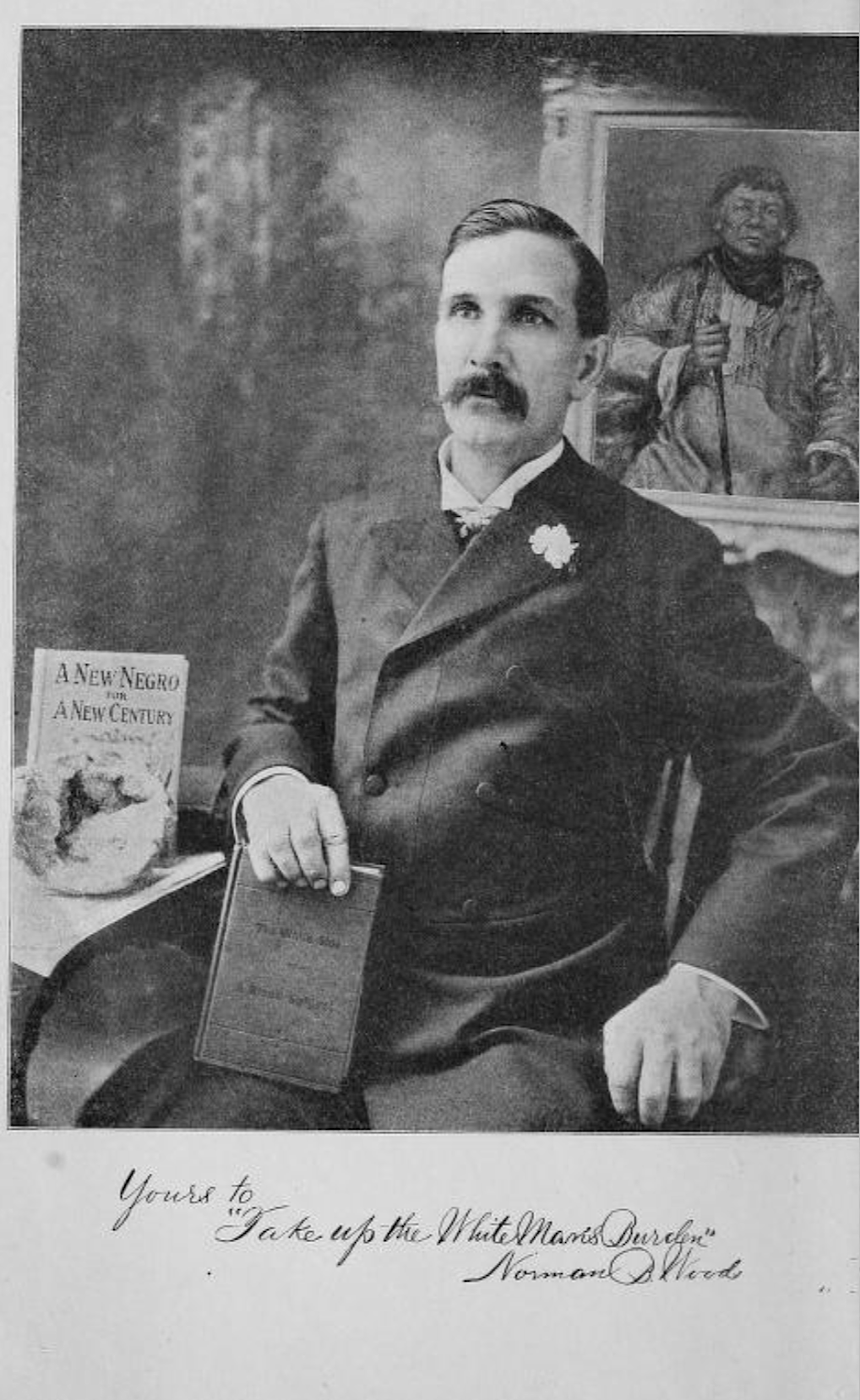
- Born: August 18, 1857; Fayette County, Kentucky, U.S.
- Died: December 25, 1933; Aurora, Illinois, U.S.
- Education: Southern Baptist Theological Seminary
- Occupation(s): Author, lecturer, Baptist minister

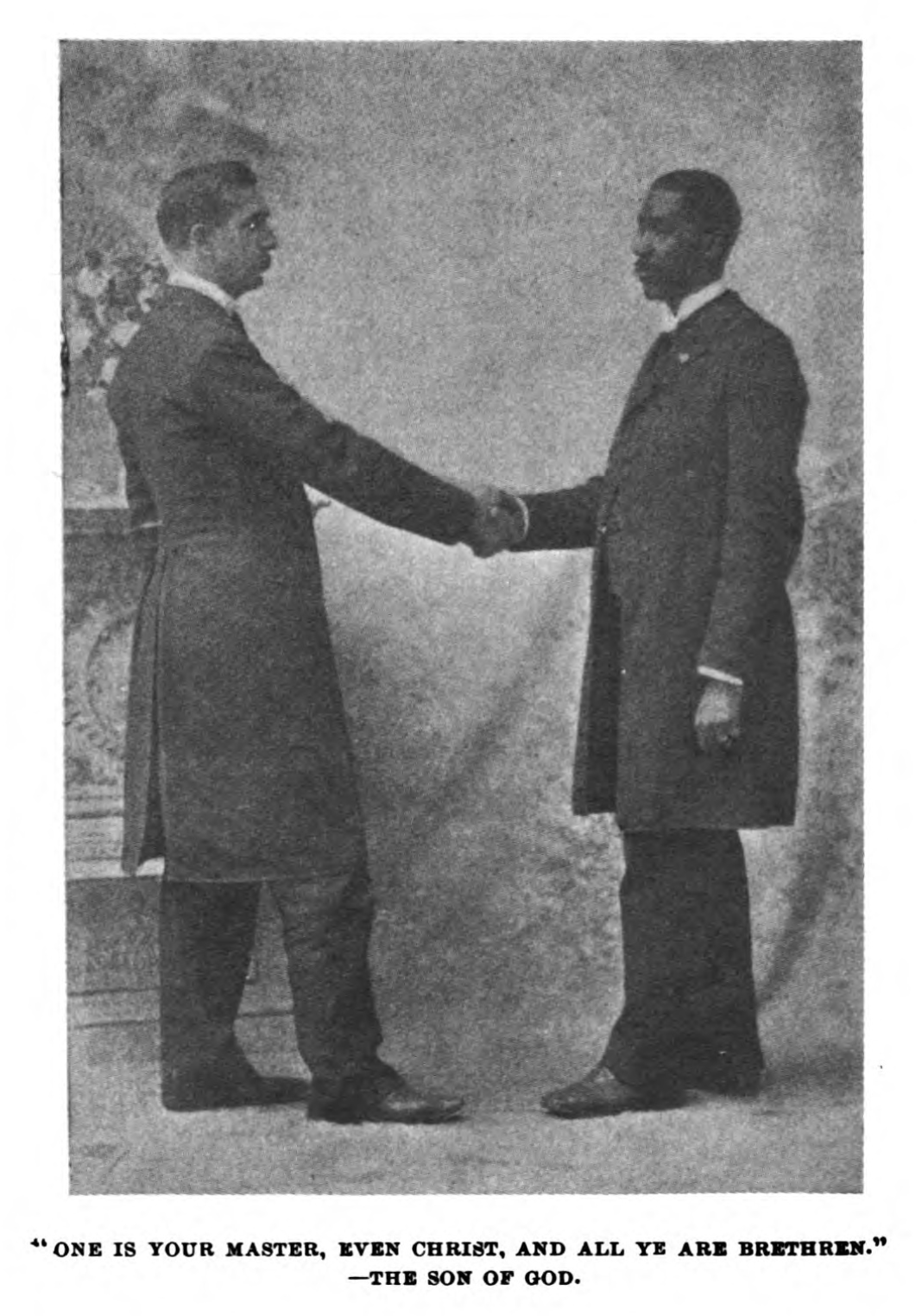
Rev. Norman Barton Wood (left) and Rev. Harry Knight from the book, The White Side Of A Black Subject (1897)

Norman Barton Wood (1857–1933) also known as N. B. Wood, was an American author, lecturer, and Baptist minister. He was White, and wrote books about African Americans and Native Americans in the late 19th century and early 20th century. He lived in Aurora, Illinois.

== Early life and education ==
Wood was born on August 18, 1857, in Fayette County, Kentucky, U.S., to parents Narcissa (née Wheat) and Benjamin Wood. He attended the Southern Baptist Theological Seminary in Louisville, Kentucky, and studied under Rev. William Heth Whitsitt.

== Career ==
Wood was a minister in the Baptist church. He served as pastor at the Claim Street Baptist Church in Aurora, Illinois. In 1898, he served as the chairman of the Temperance League in Aurora, Illinois.

He co-authored the book about the Black struggle in the early 20th-century with Booker T. Washington and Fannie Barrier Williams, A New Negro for a New Century: An Accurate and Up-to-Date Record of the Upward Struggles of the Negro Race (1900). It contains stories about Black history, journalism, slave narratives, biographical sketches, and stories from Black soldiers who fought in U.S. wars. Much of the book A New Negro for a New Century is rooted in late 18th-century ideas about race, and is considered to be outdated racial theory in the 21st century. The book may have been written in order to refute claims made by President Theodore Roosevelt in Scribner's Magazine in 1899 about "racial fitness" or possibly in order to move the dialogue passed popular 18th-century Black stereotypes, such as fictionalized plantation stories, vaudeville, and "scientific racism".

Wood dedicated some 20 years to researching, lecturing and writing about Native Americans, including his book Lives of Famous Indian Chiefs: From Cofachiqui, the Indian Princess, and Powhatan, Down to and Including Chief Joseph and Geronimo (1906). The book includes an image of Wood seated with his books accompanied by the caption, "Yours to 'Take up the White Man's Burden'" and his signature Norman B. Wood.

Wood died of a heart attack on December 25, 1933, in Aurora, Illinois. He was interred at the Naperville Cemetery in Naperville, Illinois.

== Publications ==
- Wood, Norman B. (1897). The White Side of a Black Subject: A Vindication of the Afro-American Race, From the Landing of Slaves at St. Augustine, Florida, in 1565, to the Present Time. Chicago, IL.: American Publishing House.
- Washington, Booker T.; Wood, Norman B.; Williams, Fannie Barrier (1900). MacBrady, John E. (ed.). A New Negro for a New Century: An Accurate and Up-to-Date Record of the Upward Struggles of the Negro Race. Chicago, IL: American Publishing House.
- Lives of Famous Indian Chiefs: From Cofachiqui, the Indian Princess, and Powhatan, Down to and Including Chief Joseph and Geronimo. Aurora, IL.: American Indian Historical Pub. Co. 1906.
