= Winifred Bonfils =

American reporter and columnist

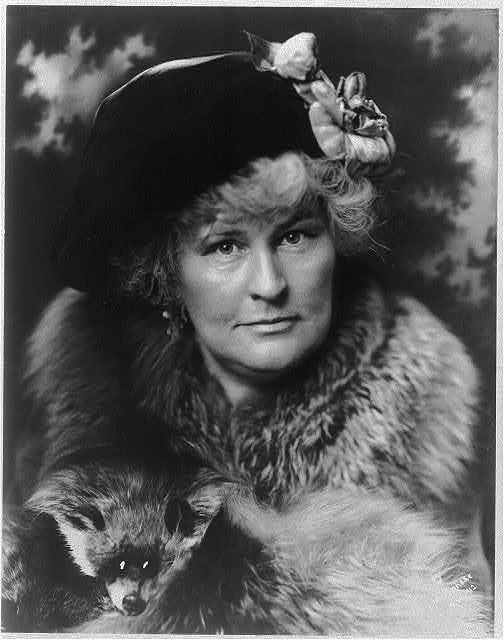
- Bonfils in 1913
- Born: Winifred Sweet; October 14, 1863; Chilton, Wisconsin, U.S.
- Died: May 25, 1936 (aged 72); San Francisco, California, U.S.
- Other names: Annie Laurie; Winifred Black
- Occupation: Journalist

Winifred Sweet Black Bonfils (October 14, 1863, Chilton, Wisconsin – May 25, 1936, San Francisco, California) was an American reporter and columnist, under the pen name Annie Laurie, a reference to her mother's favorite lullaby. She also wrote under the name Winifred Black.

== Career ==
Bonfils, as Winifred Black and as Annie Laurie, wrote celebrity and sensational articles, the kind sought after by William Randolph Hearst's news syndicate, and for the San Francisco Examiner. She was one of the most prominent "sob sisters", a label given female reporters who wrote human interest stories. Her stories often contained baseless statistics and lurid headlines especially with regard to drug use. Her first husband was Orlow Black, and her second was publisher Charles Bonfils.

After writing to the Chicago Tribune, in 1890 she found work at the San Francisco Examiner. She was a reporter, telegraph editor, Sunday editor, assistant city editor, special writer. She investigated the leper settlement in Molokai, Hawaii, in 1892. She raised funds for founding several charities. She investigated the public hospitals in San Francisco and those inaugurating many reforms. She helped found Junior Republic for Boys in New York. She conducted California Children's Excursion to World's Fair in Chicago. She managed hospitals and relief work for Galveston flood victims. She organized and managed the national and international fight against narcotic evil.

She is famous for staging a fainting on the street to test emergency services in San Francisco, a form of stunt reporting that resulted in a major scandal and institution of the ambulance service. In 1900, she dressed as a boy and was the first reporter on the line at the Galveston hurricane of 1900. She delivered an exclusive and Hearst sent relief supplies by train.

She covered the 1906 San Francisco earthquake and had a front row seat at the murder trial of Harry Thaw in 1907. Her coverage of the trial and descriptions of Thaw's wife Evelyn Nesbit earned her the label of "sob sister".

She reported from Europe during the First World War, later becoming a columnist.

She wrote a biography of Phoebe Apperson Hearst, The Life and Personality of Phoebe Apperson Hearst.

The name "Annie Laurie" was a tribute to her contemporary Nellie Bly.

She was the author of "The Little Boy Who Lived on the Hill" (1895), about her son who drowned at Carmel in 1926, and "Roses and Rain".

== Life ==
Born Winifred Sweet in Chilton, Wisconsin, she was the daughter of Civil War General Benjamin Sweet and Lovisa Denslow, and the sister of Ada Celeste Sweet, who held the first position as disbursing officer ever given to a woman by the US government.

Winifred grew up on a farm in Lombard, Illinois, attending a number of private schools in the Chicago area. After attempting a career as an actress, became a journalist, writing for a short time in Chicago before landing a job at the San Francisco Examiner in 1890. She was married in June 1891 to Orlow Black, a fellow worker on a morning San Francisco newspaper. They had one son in 1892, Jeffrey Black, who died young. On September 13, 1897, she filed for divorce, charging Black with cruelty. "The divorce complaint pictures Mrs. Black as the breadwinner of the family." After the divorce she moved to Denver, Colorado. In the late 1920s she was back to California, living at 37 Florence St., San Francisco, California, and married to Charles A. Bonfils, brother of Frederick Gilmer Bonfils. They had two children, Winifred Bonfils Barker, who married C. O. Barker, and Eugene Napoleon Bonfils, who died young.

== Death ==
On the night of May 25, 1936, Bonfils died. The announcement in The San Bernardino Daily Sun reported:

To the moment of her death she insisted she was neither a "sob sister nor a special writer".

"I'm just a plain, practical all-around newspaper woman," said the white-haired 73-year-old woman who began and ended her career in writing for the W. R. Hearst newspapers.

"I'd rather smell the printers' ink and hear the presses go 'round than go to any grand opera in the world," she once said.

Her funeral was a civic ceremony in San Francisco, with her body lying in state in the City Hall. She was buried at Holy Cross Cemetery in Colma, California.
