= Ada Celeste Sweet =

American social reformer, humanitarian, editor

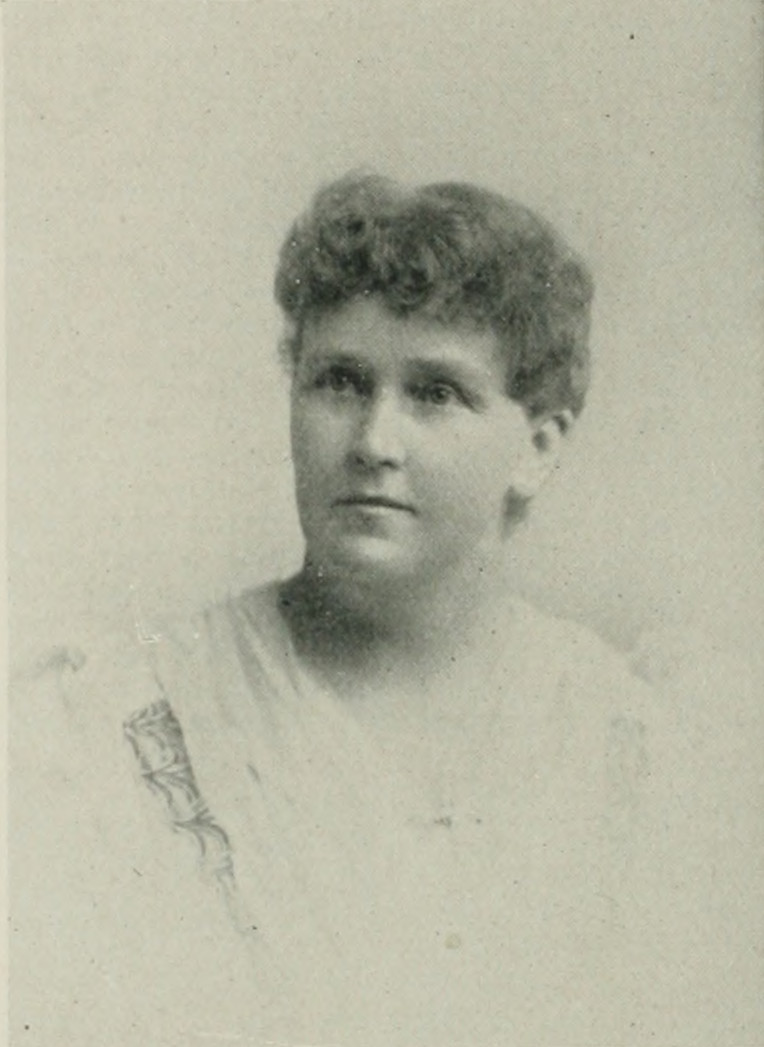
Portrait photo from A Woman of the Century

Ada Celeste Sweet (23 February 1853 – 17 September 1928) was an American reformer and humanitarian originally from the U.S. state of Wisconsin, but subsequently from Illinois. President Ulysses S. Grant appointed her United States agent for paying pensions in Chicago, the first position as disbursing officer ever given to a woman by the US government. She established a strict system of civil service reform, which made her unpopular with politicians. In addition to being the founder of the ambulance system for the Chicago police, she did philanthropic work, labored for governmental reforms, and served as literary editor of the Chicago Tribune.

== Early years and education ==
Ada Celeste Sweet was born in Stockbridge, Wisconsin, February 23, 1853. Her father was Benjamin J. Sweet, a successful lawyer and later, a Wisconsin State senator. Her mother, née Lovisa L. Denslow, was a daughter of Elihu Denslow, and from the same place in New York as the Sweet family. There were several siblings including in 1854, Lawrence Wheelock; in 1858, Minnie; in 1865, Martha Winfred; and Benjamin Jeffrey, in 1871.

When the civil war began, her father entered the Union Army as Major of the 6th Wisconsin Volunteer Infantry Regiment. Afterwards, as Colonel of the 21st Infantry Regiment, he was wounded at Battle of Perryville. Later, he took command of Camp Douglas in Chicago as Colonel of the Eighth US Veteran Reserve Corps.

Sweet spent her summers in Wisconsin and her winters in a convent school in Chicago. After the war, General Sweet settled on a farm 20 miles (32 km) from Chicago and opened a law office in the city. Sweet, the oldest of the children, aided her father in his business. She was carefully educated and soon developed business expertise.

== Career ==
In 1868, General Sweet was appointed by President Grant as pension agent in Chicago. Ada entered the office, learned the details of the business, and carried on the work for years. In 1872, General Sweet was made first deputy Commissioner of Internal Revenue, and moved to Washington, D.C. Ada accompanied him as his private secretary. He died on New Year's Day, 1874, leaving an estate too small to provide for his family.

President Grant then appointed Ada Sweet as US agent for paying pensions in Chicago, the first position as disbursing officer ever given to a woman by the government of the US. The Chicago agency contained 6,000 names of northern Illinois pensioners on its roll, and the disbursements amounted to over US$1,000,000 yearly. She made the office independent of politics and appointed women as assistants. In 1877, President Hayes made all Illinois pensions payable in Chicago, and her office disbursed over US$6,000,000 yearly. She chose her own clerks and trained them for her work. She did so well that, in spite of pressure brought to secure the appointment of a man, she was reappointed in 1878 by President Rutherford B. Hayes, and in 1882 by President Chester A. Arthur. In 1885, the Democratic party commissioner of pensions asked her to resign, but she appealed to President Grover Cleveland, and he left her in the office until September 1885, when she resigned, to take a business position in New York City.

In 1886, she visited Europe. Returning to Chicago, she became the literary editor of the Chicago Tribune. In 1888, she opened a United States claims office in Chicago, and did a large business in securing pensions for soldiers or their families, retiring in 1905. In 1892, Sweet was appointed to the Chicago Board of Education. From 1911 to 1913, she managed The Equitable Life Assurance Society's woman's department.

== Personal life ==
Sweet lived in Chicago with her brother. She was interested in all the work of women, and served as a member of the Chicago Woman's Club, where she worked on the club committee for compulsory education. She was also a Trustee of the Civic Federation. In May 1894, Sweet became president of the Chicago Woman's Club. She was the founder and first President of the Municipal Order League of Chicago, a society formed to improve the sanitary condition, and thereby the healthfulness, of the city. In October 1890, she gave the first police ambulance to the city, having raised money among her friends to build and equip it, and thus originated the present system in Chicago of caring for those who are injured or fall ill in public places.

On September 17, 1928, Sweet died in San Francisco, California at the home of her sister, Winifred Bonfils, another important figure in the history of women's rights.
