= 21st Wisconsin Infantry Regiment =

Union Army infantry regiment

- Flag of Wisconsin
- Active: September 5, 1862 – June 17, 1865
- Country: United States
- Allegiance: Union
- Branch: Infantry
- Size: Regiment
- Engagements: American Civil War: Kentucky Campaign; Battle of Perryville; Stones River Campaign; Battle of Stones River; Tullahoma campaign; Battle of Hoover's Gap; Chickamauga campaign; Battle of Davis's Cross Roads; Battle of Chickamauga; Atlanta campaign; Battle of Rocky Face Ridge; Battle of Resaca; Battle of Kennesaw Mountain; Battle of Marietta; Battle of Peachtree Creek; Battle of Jonesborough; Savannah campaign; Carolinas campaign; Battle of Bentonville

Commanders
- Colonel: Benjamin Sweet
- Colonel: Harrison C. Hobart
- Lt. Colonel: Michael H. Fitch
- Major: Charles H. Walker

The 21st Wisconsin Infantry Regiment was a volunteer infantry regiment that served in the Union Army during the American Civil War. They were assigned for their entire war service to XIV Corps, operating in the western theater of the war.

== Service ==
The 21st Wisconsin Infantry was established by Governor Edward Salomon as one of several new regiments to fill President Abraham Lincoln's call for 300,000 three-year volunteers. The volunteers of the 21st Wisconsin Infantry were mostly drawn from the counties of Fond du Lac, Winnebago, Outagamie, Waupaca, Calumet, and Manitowoc.

Organized at Oshkosh, Wisconsin, and mustered on September 5, 1862. Left Wisconsin for Cincinnati, Ohio, September 11, thence to Covington, Ky., and to Louisville, Ky., September 15. Duty in the fortification of Louisville September 18 – October 1. Attached to 28th Brigade, 3rd Division, Army of the Ohio, September, 1862. 28th Brigade, 3rd Division, 1st Army Corps, Army of the Ohio, to November, 1862. 3rd Brigade, 1st Division, Center 14th Army Corps, Army of the Cumberland, to January, 1863. 3rd Brigade, 1st Division, 14th Army Corps, Army of the Cumberland, to April, 1863. 2nd Brigade, 1st Division, 14th Army Corps, to April, 1864. 1st Brigade, 1st Division, 14th Army Corps, to June, 1865.

SERVICE.--Pursuit of Bragg to Crab Orchard, Ky., October 1–16, 1862. Battle of Perryville, Ky., October 8. Guard duty at Mitchellsville until December 7. Moved to Nashville, Tenn., and duty there until December 26. Advance on Murfreesboro December 26–30. Jefferson December 30. Battle of Stone's River December 30–31, 1862, and January 1–3, 1863. Duty at Murfreesboro until June. Expedition to McMinnville April 20–30. Middle Tennessee (or Tullahoma) Campaign June 23 – July 7. Hoover's Gap June 24–26. Occupation of Middle Tennessee until August 16. Passage of the Cumberland Mountains and Tennessee River and Chickamauga (Ga.) Campaign August 16 – September 22. Davis Cross Roads, near Dug Gap, September 11. Battle of Chickamauga September 19–21. Rossville Gap September 21. Siege of Chattanooga September 24 – November 23. Chattanooga-Ringgold Campaign November 23–27. Orchard Knob November 23–24. Mission Ridge November 25. Reconnaissance to Cooper's Gap November 30 – December 3. Atlanta (Ga.) Campaign May 1 to September 8, 1864. Demonstrations on Rocky Faced Ridge May 8–11. Battle of Resaca May 14–15. Advance on Dallas May 18–25. Operations on line of Pumpkin Vine Creek and battles about Dallas, New Hope Church and Allatoona Hills May 25 – June 5. Pickett's Mills May 27. Operations about Marietta and against Kenesaw Mountain June 10 – July 2. Pine Hill June 11–14. Lost Mountain June 15–17. Assault on Kenesaw June 27. Ruff's Station July 4. Chattahoochie River July 5–17. Buckhead, Nancy's Creek, July 18. Peach Tree Creek July 19–20. Siege of Atlanta July 22 – August 25. Utoy Creek August 5–7. Flank movement on Jonesboro August 25–30. Near Red Oak August 29. Battle of Jonesboro August 31 – September 1. Operations against Hood in North Georgia and North Alabama September 30 – November 3. March to the sea November 15 – December 10. Siege of Savannah December 10–21. Campaign of the Carolinas January to April, 1865. Taylor's Hole Creek, Averysboro, N. C., March 16. Battle of Bentonville March 19–21. Occupation of Goldsboro March 24. Advance on Raleigh April 10–14. Occupation of Raleigh April 14. Bennett's House April 26. Surrender of Johnston and his army. March to Washington, D.C., via Richmond, Va., April 29 – May 17. Grand Review May 24. Mustered out June 8 and discharged from service June 17, 1865.

Organization of Regiment.
Company	Earliest Moniker	Primary Place of Recruitment	Earliest Captain
A	Fond Du Lac Company	Fond du Lac and Fond du Lac County	Alexander White
B	Oshkosh Company	Oshkosh and Winnebago County	Charles N. Paine
C	Oshkosh Company	Oshkosh and Winnebago County	Alphonso S. Godfrey
D	Appleton Company	Appleton and Outagamie County	John Jewett Jr.
E	Chilton Company	Chilton and Calumet County	Hiram M. Gibbs
F	Oakfield Company	Oakfield, Fond du Lac, and Fond du Lac County	Edgar Conklin
G	Waupaca Company	Waupaca and Waupaca County	Milan H. Sessions
H	Fond Du Lac Company	Fond du Lac and Fond du Lac County	George Bentley
I	Menasha Company	Menasha and Winnebago County	Simeon Batchelder Nelson
K	Manitowoc Company	Manitowoc and Manitowoc County	Charles H. Walker

== Casualties ==
The 21st Wisconsin suffered 5 officers and 117 enlisted men killed in action or who later died of their wounds, plus another 3 officers and 180 enlisted men who died of disease, for a total of 305 fatalities.

== Commanders ==
- Colonel Benjamin Sweet – Was major of the 6th Wisconsin Infantry, then assigned colonel for 21st Wisconsin Infantry. Was wounded at Battle of Perryville and had to resign commission. Before the war was a Wisconsin state legislator.
- Colonel Harrison C. Hobart – Was captain in 4th Wisconsin Infantry, then assigned Lt. Colonel for 21st Wisconsin Infantry. Was wounded and taken prisoner at Battle of Chickamauga, and later escaped, then commanded 21st Wisconsin Infantry until promoted to brigade command. Before the war was 2nd Speaker of the Wisconsin State Assembly and Democratic nominee for Governor of Wisconsin.
- Lt. Colonel Michael H. Fitch – Was adjutant of regiment, then major and lt. colonel. Wrote a memoir of his war service.
- Major Charles H. Walker – Was captain of Co. K, then major. Before the war was a Wisconsin state legislator and judge.

== Notable people ==
- Charles B. Clark was enlisted in Co. I and later rose to the rank of 1st lieutenant in that company. After the war he became a U.S. Congressman and co-founder of the Kimberly-Clark Corporation.
- Wynn Edwards was a private in Co. F and was wounded at Atlanta. After the war he became a Wisconsin state legislator.
- William Fowler was a sergeant in Co. E and died of wounds at the Battle of Perryville. He was the first non-white legislator in Wisconsin Territory.
- Milan H. Sessions was captain of Co. E and resigned due to disability in 1863. After the war he became a Wisconsin state legislator.
- De Wayne Stebbins was a corporal in Co. K for just 2 months, after which he was enrolled as an officer in the U.S. Navy. After the war he became a Wisconsin state senator.
- William Wall was enlisted in Co. C, then commissioned as 1st lieutenant and promoted to captain in 1863. After the war he became a Wisconsin state legislator.
- Joseph H. Woodnorth was a private in Co. G until June 1864, when he was detailed as an orderly and clerk on the staff of General George Henry Thomas. He received an honorary brevet to captain and after the war became a Wisconsin state senator.

== See also ==
- List of Wisconsin Civil War units
- Wisconsin in the American Civil War
