= Benjamin Sweet =

American Civil War officer, Republican politician, and public administrator

Benjamin J. Sweet
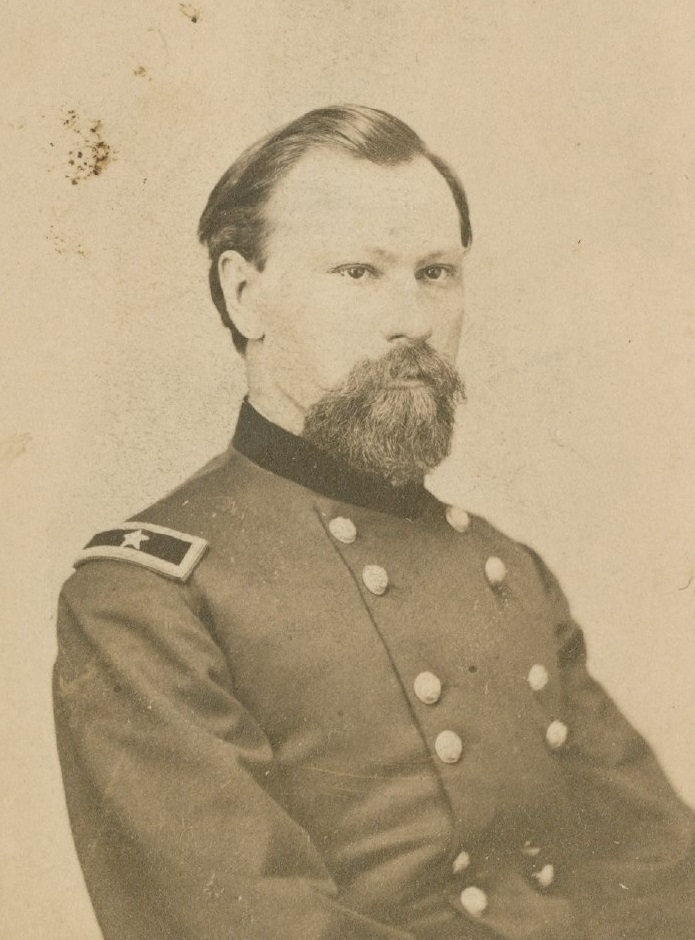

Member of the Wisconsin Senate from the 19th district
- In office January 1, 1861 – January 1, 1862
- Preceded by: Samuel H. Thurber
- Succeeded by: George A. Jenkins

Personal details
- Born: Benjamin Jeffery Sweet; April 24, 1832 Kirkland, New York, U.S.
- Died: January 1, 1874 (aged 41) Washington, D.C., U.S.
- Spouses: Lovisa Loveland Denslow; (died 1878)
- Children: Ada Celeste Sweet^{(b. 1853; died 1928)}; Lawrence Wheelock Sweet^{(b. 1854)}; Minnie Sweet^{(b. 1857)}; Martha Winifred (Bonfils)^{(b. 1863; died 1936)}; Benjamin Jeffery Sweet^{(b. 1871; died 1906)}
- Parents: James Sweet (father); Charlotte (Newell) Sweet (mother)

Military service
- Allegiance: United States
- Branch/service: United States Army; Union Army
- Years of service: 1861–1865
- Rank: Colonel, USV; Brevet Brig. General, USV
- Commands: 21st Reg. Wis. Vol. Infantry
- Battles/wars: American Civil War: Northern Virginia campaign; Confederate Heartland Offensive; Battle of Perryville

Benjamin Jeffery Sweet (April 24, 1832 – January 1, 1874) was an American lawyer, politician, public administrator, and Union Army officer. He was a member of the Wisconsin State Senate and a Deputy Commissioner of Internal Revenue.

Sweet is also an important figure in the history of women's rights. The founding document he prepared for the town of Lombard, Illinois, stated that "all citizens" are entitled to vote. In 1891, Ellen A. Martin invoked that provision and voted, 29 years before women were empowered by an amendment to the Constitution to vote in the United States. His two daughters, Ada Celeste Sweet and Winifred Bonfils were also important figures in the history of the battle for women's rights.

== Biography ==
Sweet was born Benjamin Jeffery Sweet on April 24, 1832, in New York City. He later moved to Chilton, Wisconsin. Sweet died on January 1, 1874. He had two noteworthy daughters: Ada Celeste Sweet was a social reformer and pioneer for women serving in government office; Winifred Bonfils (born Martha Winifred Sweet) was a journalist and humanitarian.

== Political career ==
Sweet was elected to the Wisconsin State Senate. He later served as Deputy Commissioner of Internal Revenue of the United States from 1872 until his death.

== Military career ==
Soon after the outbreak of the American Civil War, on July 16, 1861, Sweet joined the 6th Wisconsin Volunteer Infantry Regiment of the Union Army and was given the rank of major. On September 17, 1861, he was promoted to lieutenant colonel. On September 5, 1862, Sweet was promoted to colonel and given command of the 21st Wisconsin Volunteer Infantry Regiment. During the Battle of Perryville, in Kentucky, despite being sick from malaria, he led his men in combat until he was seriously wounded in his right arm. The wound ultimately left Sweet paralyzed in that arm for the rest of his life. Sweet resigned his commission on September 8, 1863.

On September 25, 1863, Sweet was appointed a colonel in the Veteran Reserve Corps and assigned to the garrison at the Union Army prisoner-of-war camp for Confederate States Army soldiers at Camp Douglas, Chicago, Illinois. Following recuperation from his injury, Sweet was given command of Camp Douglas after Brigadier General William W. Orme resigned on May 2, 1864. At Camp Douglas, Sweet oversaw what some observers have called the unnecessarily harsh and cruel treatment of Confederate prisoners, but which other observers have seen as no less so than Confederate treatment of Union prisoners.

This notwithstanding, Sweet would soon be lauded for "discovering" and "thwarting" a bogus plot by spies for the Confederacy to liberate Confederate prisoners of war and attack Chicago on the eve of the 1864 United States presidential election. Sweet's efforts to prevent the conspirators from achieving their objective earned him the thanks of the United States Department of War. On December 12, 1864, President Lincoln awarded Sweet the rank of brevet brigadier general of volunteers to rank from December 20, 1864, and the U.S. Senate confirmed the award on February 14, 1865.

Sweet resigned from the army on September 19, 1865. He died from a sudden illness in 1874.
