= Victor Yarros =

American anarchist (1865–1956)

- Born: 1865; Russia
- Died: 1956 (aged 90–91)
- Spouse: Rachelle Yarros

Victor S. Yarros (1865–1956) was an American anarchist, lawyer and author. He immigrated to the United States with his friend Charles David Spivak in 1882. He was law partner to Clarence Darrow for eleven years in Chicago, husband to the feminist gynecologist Rachelle Yarros (née Slobodinsky) and resident of Hull-House Settlement. He was a prolific contributor to the individualist anarchist periodical in the United States called Liberty.

Yarros' political views evolved significantly over the years, from free-market anarchism to social democracy. He shifted from Spencerian anarchism, to individualist anarchism under Benjamin Tucker and finally to a follower of Lysander Spooner. According to Roderick T. Long, by the 1930s, Yarros came to believe that the democratic state was useful in the struggle against economic privilege.

== See also ==
- Anarchism in the United States
- Left-libertarianism
