= Alice Bradford Wiles =

American clubwoman

Alice Bradford Wiles, in an 1893 publication

Alice Bradford Wiles (February 16, 1853 – February 20, 1929) was an American clubwoman based in Chicago, Illinois. She was active at the national level with the Daughters of the American Revolution and at the state level as president of the Illinois Federation of Women's Clubs.

== Early life and education ==
Alice Bradford was born in Roxbury, Massachusetts, the daughter of Joseph Russell Bradford and Sarah Jane Toppan Bradford. She attended Mount Holyoke Seminary and joined the first class of women admitted to Cornell University, in 1872. She graduated in 1875.

== Career ==
In 1891, Alice Bradford Wiles was appointed to Illinois Woman's Exposition Board, and elected First Vice President of the board, to represent the state's women in planning the 1893 World's Columbian Exposition in Chicago. She chaired the committee on manufactures, inventions, and designs, which meant gathering Illinois women's handmade goods for display at the exposition.

She was founder of the Freeport Woman's Club, and was elected president of the Illinois Federation of Women's Clubs in 1897. She was also national president of the United States Daughters of 1812, from 1915 to 1919, and was briefly on the executive committee of the Illinois Society for Child Study in 1897.

She joined the Daughters of the American Revolution in 1893. In 1899, she was head of Chicago's large chapter of the Daughters of the American Revolution. She remained active in the DAR into the 1920s, when she chaired the organization's national Committee on Legislation in the U. S. Congress. In 1925, she was elected "Honorary State Regent of Illinois for Life." She was at the center of a controversy in Chicago club circles in 1902, when she was found to be the author of an anonymous letter charging another woman's club leader with unfair business dealings. The controversy continued into 1904. In 1905, she gave a speech defending the woman's club movement against Grover Cleveland's dismissive comments.

== Personal life ==
Alice Bradford married fellow Cornell graduate and patent lawyer Robert Hall Wiles in 1876. They lived in Freeport, Illinois, and had two children, Edith and Russell. Their son Russell Wiles became a patent lawyer, and named his own daughter Alice Bradford Wiles. She was widowed in 1907. Alice Bradford Wiles died in 1929, aged 76 years.
