= Lucy Flower =

American children's rights activist (1837–1921)

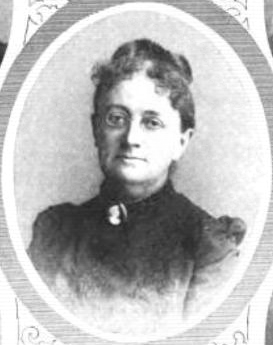
Lucy C. Flower, from an 1898 publication

Lucy Louisa Coues Flower (May 10, 1837 – April 27, 1921) was an American children's rights activist at the end of the 1800s and the beginning of the 1900s. Flower was a president of the Chicago Woman's Club. She was the major contributor in the creation of the juvenile court, along with others such as Julia Lathrop and Jane Addams. The creation of the juvenile court was not Flower's only accomplishment; she was also prominent in the creation of Illinois Training School for nurses, the foundation of the John Worthy School, and played many major roles in the Chicago School System. Flower was very interested in helping juveniles, which leads to her biggest creation - the juvenile court, founded on July 1, 1899, in Cook County, Illinois. Before the juvenile court, children as young as seven were sent to jails with adult criminals. In 1898, there were 508 crimes committed by children 10 and under, and 15,161 committed by children 10 to 20. In 1899, when the court was established, the crime rate went down for all children.

Lucy Louisa Coues was born on May 10, 1837, in Boston, Massachusetts. She was adopted by Charlotte Haven Ladd and Samuel Elliott Coues. She grew up in Portsmouth, New Hampshire, and attended the Packer Collegiate Institute from 1856 to 1857. She then worked for the United States Patent Office in Washington before moving to Madison, Wisconsin. She ran a private school there and taught high school from 1862 to 1863. She married attorney James M. Flower on September 4, 1862. They had three children and moved to Chicago in 1873. In 1911 Lucy Flower Technical High School for Girls opened on the South Side of Chicago (the school later moved to the West Side) as the city's first open-enrollment school for girls.

Flower died of a cerebral hemorrhage on April 27, 1921, in Coronado, California. Chicago's Lucy Flower Playlot Park was renamed in her honor in 2005 (formerly the People's Park).
