= Lucy Flower Technical High School for Girls =

- U.S. National Register of Historic Places
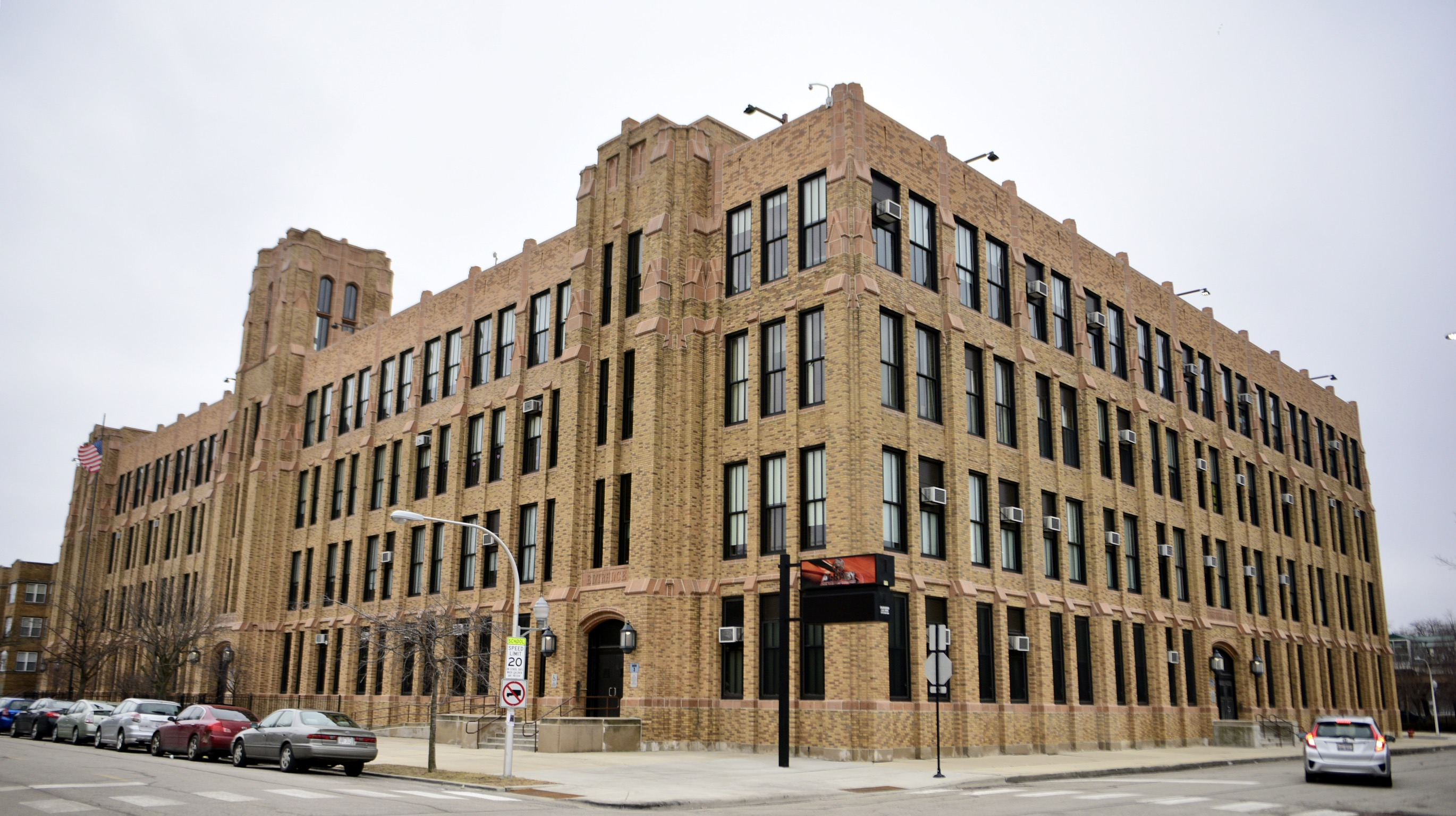

- Location within Chicago metropolitan area Location within Illinois Location within the United States
- Location: 3545 W. Fulton Boulevard, Chicago, Illinois
- Coordinates: 41°53′11″N 87°42′56″W
- Built: 1927
- Architect: John C. Christensen
- Architectural style: Gothic Revival
- NRHP reference No.: 100000960
- Added to NRHP: May 8, 2017

Lucy Flower Technical High School for Girls is a historic school building at 3545 W. Fulton Boulevard in the East Garfield Park neighborhood of Chicago, Illinois. It was built in 1927 as a larger home for the school of the same name, which was founded in 1911. Named for Lucy Flower, the school was the only all-female public high school in Chicago. Intended to parallel all-male schools such as Lane Tech and Crane Tech, Flower Tech combined vocational training and home economics in its curriculum. John C. Christensen, the Chicago Board of Education's chief architect, designed the school in the Collegiate Gothic style; inspired by English schools such as the University of Cambridge and University of Oxford, the style was a popular choice for schools at the time.

As the school accepted students from all parts of Chicago rather than a single neighborhood, it was one of the few schools to provide an integrated education. The school changed its name and admission standards in the 1960s, resulting in a perceived decline in its prestige, and the opening of another nearby vocational school hurt its enrollment. The school became coeducational in 1978 and closed in 2004. At the end of its period as a school it was known as the Al Raby School.

The building was added to the National Register of Historic Places on May 8, 2017. Its foyer has a mural by Edward Millman.
