= Fannie Barrier Williams =

American educator and activist (1855–1944)

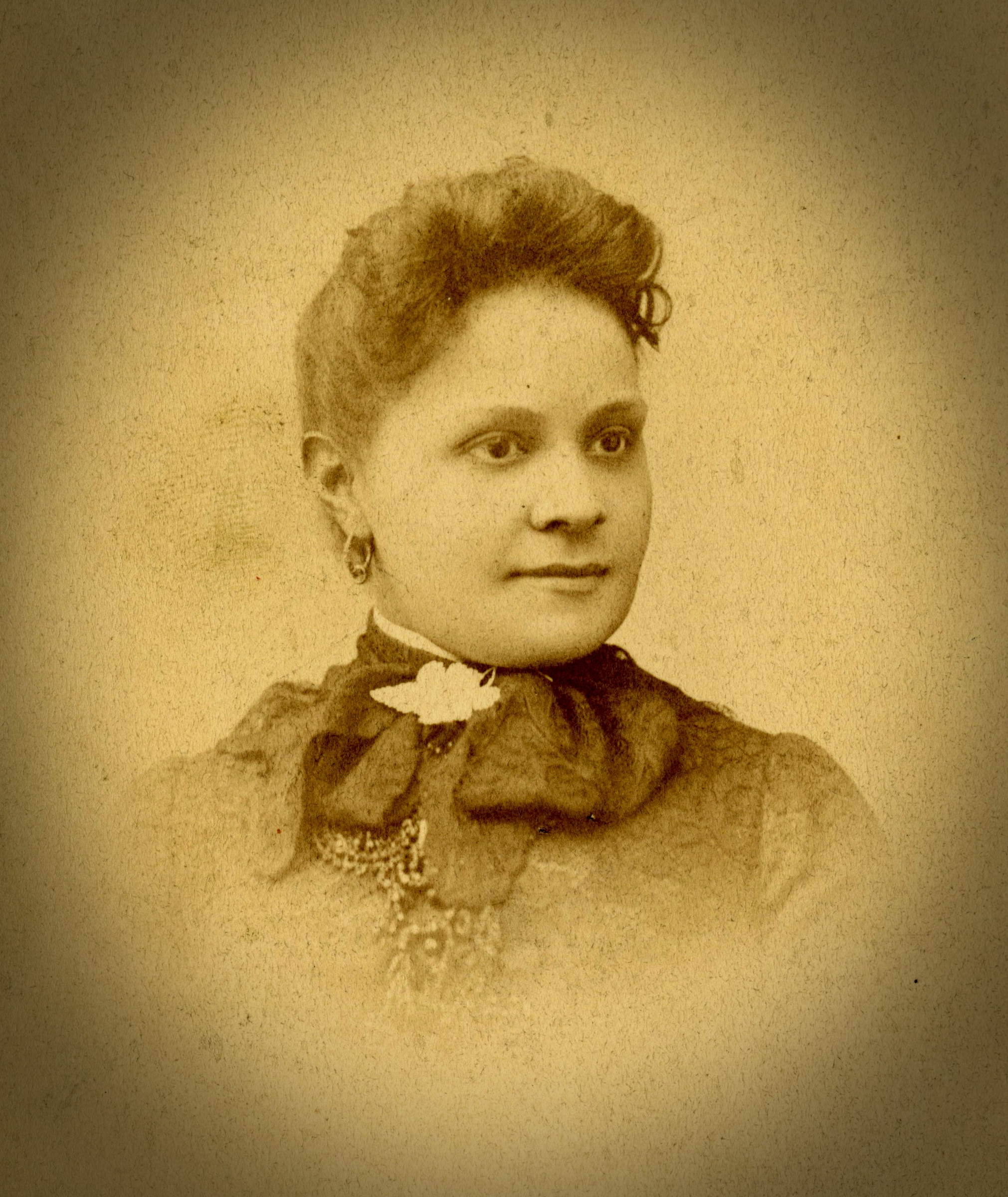
- Fannie Barrier c. 1880
- Born: Frances Barrier; February 12, 1855; Brockport, New York, U.S.
- Died: March 4, 1944 (aged 89); Brockport, New York, U.S.
- Education: The College at Brockport
- Occupations: Educator, Activist
- Spouse: S. Laing Williams (m. 1887)

Frances Barrier Williams (February 12, 1855 – March 4, 1944) was an American educator, civil rights and women's rights activist, and the first black woman to gain membership to the Chicago Woman's Club. She became well known for her efforts to have black people officially represented on the Board of Control of the World's Columbian Exposition in 1893. She was also a musician and portraitist, and studied foreign languages.

== Early life ==
Frances (Fannie) Barrier was born on February 12, 1855, the youngest of three children born to Anthony and Harriet Barrier. Her father, born in Pennsylvania, came to Brockport, New York, as a child. He claimed to be partially of French descent. He worked as a barber and later became a coal dealer. Her mother was born in Sherburne, a small community in Chenango County, New York, and was a housewife who dedicated her life to raising her children, and participating in church activities. The couple married in Brockport, where they were one of just a few black families in town. Her family was part of a privileged class since her father had built a solid real estate portfolio, and owned a profitable business. Barrier had intimate contact with the white elite, without suffering any kind of direct discrimination that was prominent elsewhere in the country. The Barrier family attended the First Baptist Church in Brockport, where Barrier's father was a well-respected lay leader, her mother taught the Bible, and she played piano. They were the only black family in the congregation.

In a 1904 autobiographical article in the Independent, Barrier recalled of her Brockport youth that "...there could not have been a relationship more cordial, respectful and intimate than that of our family and the white people of this community."

Barrier and her siblings, Ella and George, attended the "primary department" or campus school of the old Brockport Collegiate Institute. After that, Fannie Barrier continued on in the school's new incarnation as the Brockport State Normal School (now SUNY Brockport), and was the first African American to graduate in 1870.

== Education and early career ==
Fannie Barrier Williams was the first black woman to graduate from the Brockport Normal School (now SUNY Brockport). Williams was also a founding member of The Arethusa Sorority while at the Normal school in 1870. Though Arethusa is still a sorority in New York State known as Sigma Gamma Phi, the Brockport chapter was dissolved in 1939. After graduation, Barrier went south to teach at a school for blacks in Hannibal, Missouri, where she encountered a level of racism she never experienced in Brockport. For the first time, she witnessed segregation, intimidation, physical assault, and other degradations suffered by many blacks. She reported that she was "shattered" by the discrimination she encountered and this new awareness of racism targeted toward women of color ultimately led her to pursue a lifetime of activism.

Disheartened by the racism she was experiencing, Barrier left the south to study piano at the New England Conservatory of Music in Boston, Massachusetts. However, the conservatory had a widespread reach and influence, drawing students from both the North and the South. Southern white students objected to Barrier's presence, and she was pressured to leave.

After leaving the conservatory in Boston, Barrier went to the Washington, D.C., area to teach, joining the emerging education movement, which focused on freedmen and freedwomen. The education movement and community allowed her to socialize and make connections with other educated blacks. However, she also experienced significant difficulties due to her race when she enrolled in the School of Fine Arts in Washington to study portrait painting.

While teaching in Washington, D.C., she met her future husband Samuel Laing Williams of Georgia and Chicago. He worked in the United States Pension Office while studying law at Columbian University (later George Washington University Law School). They were married in Brockport in August 1887, returned to Washington, and eventually settled in Chicago, Illinois, where Williams was admitted to the Illinois Bar, and began a successful law practice. The couple joined All Souls (Unitarian) Church in Chicago.

== Social activism and charity work ==
Barrier Williams and her husband Samuel Laing Williams were part of the Black midwestern aristocracy, and became active among local community activists and reformers. Chicago's black elite included two distinct groups, the old guard, many of whom migrated to Chicago to escape the oppressive climate of the South, and the new generation. Combined, they were known as the "Black 400."

The new generation were usually born free and educated, and the women were more visible in the public sphere than ever before. Interracial cooperation was also crucial to building networks and gaining influence.

Barrier Williams distinguished herself as an artist and a scholar. She was a well-known portraitist and studied German. Barrier Williams and her husband were among the founding members of the Prudence Crandall Study Club, an organization formed by Chicago's elite black American community. Barrier Williams was director of the art and music department, and she led the women's group alongside Mary Jones, who was a mentor and friend to her. They were known as the "Cultured Negro Ladies."

Although many white women's organizations did not embrace their black counterparts as equals, Barrier Williams made a place for herself in the Illinois Woman's Alliance (IWA), which provided a bridge between the women of the Prudence Crandall Study Club and the greater world of public activism, particularly within the labor movement. The IWA made women's issues public concerns, particularly regarding health and hygiene. Barrier Williams became Vice President of the IWA in 1889, and served on the committee focusing on the health and hygiene of the poor.

Associating with both Frederick Douglass and Booker T. Washington, she represented the viewpoint of black Americans in the Illinois Women's Alliance and lectured frequently on the need for all women, but especially black women, to have the vote. Her women's rights was recognized when she was the only black American selected to eulogize Susan B. Anthony at the 1907 National American Woman Suffrage Association convention.

Barrier Williams helped found the National League of Colored Women in 1893 and its successor, the National Association of Colored Women (NACW) in 1896. She was also among the founders of the National Association for the Advancement of Colored People (NAACP), and worked with Mary Church Terrell to create the National Federation of Afro-American Women in 1895.

Barrier Williams played a crucial role in advocating for the development of Provident Hospital, which opened in 1891. She adamantly lobbied for a hospital for blacks and run by blacks, particularly staffed with all-black nurses, which would provided a much-needed employment opportunity for black women.

Barrier Williams utilized her alliance with the IWA to facilitate her entry into the white women's club movement. Barrier Williams was nominated as the first black woman to the prestigious Chicago Woman's Club in 1894 and when she was nominated, she and her supporters received threats, both public and private. It was a struggle to finalize her nomination, but she was finally inducted as a member in 1896.

Barrier Williams and her husband worked for the Hyde Park Colored Voters Republican Club and the Colored Taft League. Williams played a central and continuous role in the development of the Frederick Douglass Center in 1905, a settlement house, which she called "the black Hull House." She was also instrumental in the creation of the Phyllis Wheatley Home for Girls.

=== Columbian Exposition of 1893 ===
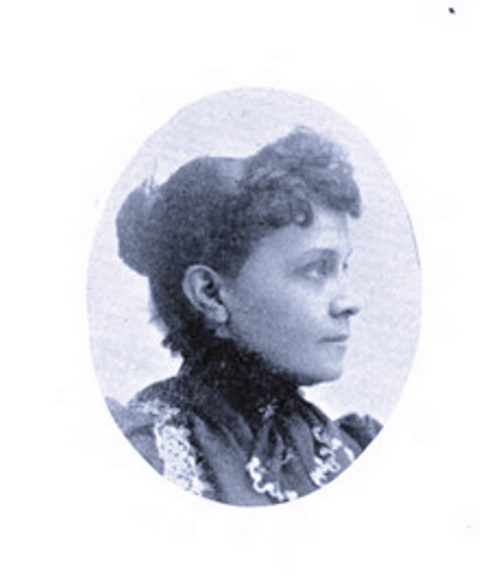
Fannie Barrier Williams

Barrier Williams achieved broader public recognition due to her efforts to gain representation of Black individuals at the Chicago Columbian Exposition of 1893. She succeeded in having two staff appointments designated for black-Americans, and ensured that black-American interests were included in the program. She was appointed as Clerk in Charge of Colored Interests in the Department of Publicity and Promotions.

Barrier Williams was invited to present two major addresses at the Exposition. In the first, "The Intellectual Progress of the Colored Women of the United States Since the Emancipation Proclamation," Barrier Williams addressed the World's Congress of Representative Women, and disputed the notion that slavery had rendered black American women incapable of the same moral and intellectual levels as other women. She called on all women to unite to claim their inalienable rights. Her address was followed by a discussion by Anna Julia Cooper and Fanny Jackson Coppin, as well as words of praise for all three women's speeches from Frederick Douglass.

The second speech was presented to the World's Parliament of Religions. The address (entitled "What Can Religion Further Do to Advance the Condition of the American Negro?") called upon churches, particularly those in the South, to open their doors to all people, regardless of race. Barrier Williams proclaimed a continuing belief in the ability of religion and faith to correct society's problems.

== Later life ==
From 1900 she became an outspoken supporter of Booker T. Washington's program of accommodation and self-improvement. After the death of her husband in 1921, Barrier Williams remained in Chicago until 1926. In 1924, the widowed Williams became the first woman and the first black American to be named to the Chicago Library Board.

She returned to Brockport in 1926 to live with her sister Ella D. Barrier, where she enjoyed a much simpler and quiet life. The Brockport Republic wrote in 1932 that she was "very ill with the grip." She seemingly recovered but due to her declining health, she wrote her will and last testament five years later. She named people she generally cared for and the organizations where people had embraced her activism as the beneficiaries of her estate and possessions.

== Death and legacy ==
On March 4, 1944, she died after a long illness. She was buried at the Brockport Cemetery on March 14, 1944, at 2pm. She was survived by her sister, Ella D. Barrier, who died a year later.

In 2014, SUNY-College at Brockport named the Fannie Barrier Williams Women of Courage Scholarship after her. It is awarded to students with a 3.0 or higher GPA, and the requirements include an essay of their commitment to social justice. In 2022, the school renamed their Liberal Arts Building in honor of her, it now being named the Fannie Barrier Williams Liberal Arts Building. The village of Brockport has also designated October 6, 2022, as Fannie Barrier Williams Day.

== Publications ==
- Washington, Booker T.; Wood, Norman B.; Williams, Fannie Barrier (1900). MacBrady, John E. (ed.). A New Negro for a New Century: An Accurate and Up-to-Date Record of the Upward Struggles of the Negro Race. Chicago, IL: American Publishing House.
- "Club Movement Among Negro Women" (1902)
- Fannie Barrier Williams, "A Northern Negro's Autobiography", The Independent, vol. LVII, No. 2002, July 14, 1904.
- Fannie Barrier Williams, "After Many Days: A Christmas Story." In A Treasury of African-American Christmas Stories, ed. Bettye Collier-Thomas. New York: Henry Holt and Company, 1997. Originally published in The Colored American Magazine 6, no. 2 (December 1902): 140–153.
- Fannie Barrier Williams, The New Woman of Color: The Collected Writings of Fannie Barrier Williams 1893–1918. DeKalb, IL: Northern Illinois University Press, 2002.
