= Rachelle Yarros =

American physician (1869–1946)

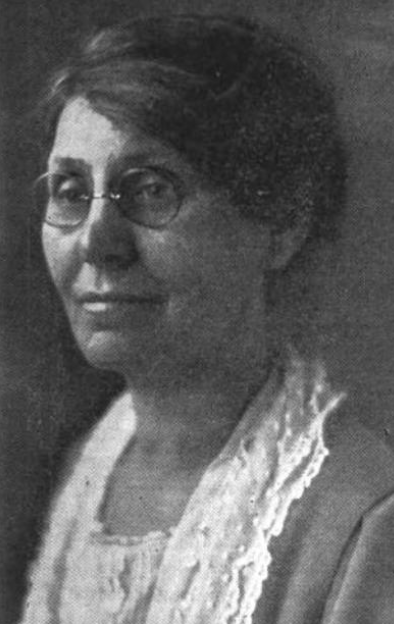
- Rachelle S. Yarros, from a 1923 newsletter
- Born: 18 May 1869; Berdychiv, Kiev Governorate, Russian Empire
- Died: 17 March 1946 (aged 76); San Diego, California, United States
- Known for: Involvement in the social hygiene movement
- Medical career
- Profession: Physician
- Field: Obstetrics and gynecology
- Institutions: Hull House, Chicago Lying-in Hospital

Rachelle Slobodinsky Yarros (18 May 1869 – 17 March 1946) was an American physician who supported the use of birth control and the social hygiene movement. A graduate of the Woman's Medical College of Pennsylvania, Yarros resided at Hull House for many years and opened the second birth control clinic in the nation there. She was an obstetrician/gynecologist affiliated with the University of Illinois at Chicago and the Chicago Lying-in Hospital.

Yarros' social causes included assisting with the founding of the American Social Hygiene Association (ASHA) and founding the first premarital and marital counseling service in the United States. Yarros was married to journalist and anarchist Victor Yarros. Late in life, she left Chicago for Florida and then California, dying of heart problems in San Diego. She also used the penname Rosa Slobodinsky when writing an Anarchist pamphlet.

== Early life ==
Rachelle Slobodinsky was born into a wealthy family in Berdychiv, a city near Kiev. Her parents were Joachim and Bernice Slobodinsky. Joining a subversive political organization when she was 13, Slobodinsky found herself gaining attention from Czarist police when she was 17, and her parents gave her enough money to escape to the United States. She fled to New York, where she got a job sewing at a sweatshop. She later moved to Boston, where she met her future husband, Victor Yarros. He was a Russian immigrant, journalist and anarchist.

== Career ==
In 1890, Slobodinsky became the first woman admitted to the College of Physicians and Surgeons in Boston. Attending a year of medical school there, Slobodinsky graduated from the Woman's Medical College of Pennsylvania in 1893. She married Victor Yarros in 1894. She completed postgraduate training at the New England Hospital for Women and Children, the New York Infirmary for Infants and Children and Michael Reese Hospital. Yarros and her husband moved to Chicago, where Yarros established a practice as an obstetrician/gynecologist and became a volunteer faculty member at the University of Illinois at Chicago.

Yarros was deeply affected by the suicide of one of her patients. A young woman had become pregnant and had been abandoned by her fiancé, and she was afraid of the ramifications that pregnancy would have for her career as a business supervisor. The woman saw Yarros in her office and begged for an abortion, but abortion was illegal and Yarros refused to perform one. The woman committed suicide on Lake Michigan that day. Yarros hoped that contraception and sex education would eliminate the need for abortions. Though some birth control advocates of the time supported the notion of eugenics, Yarros did not.

Yarros was on the UIC faculty until 1928, becoming an associate professor, and she served as an associate director of the Chicago Lying-in Hospital. Between 1907 and 1927, Rachelle and Victor Yarros resided at Hull House, where residents were heavily involved in social reform movements. Among the residents at Hull House was Yarros' friend Alice Hamilton. They had become friends during their internship in Boston. In the 1910s, Yarros was a member of the Chicago Women's Club and she encouraged them to establish a birth control committee which evolved into the Illinois Birth Control League.

For many years, Yarros was the director of the Illinois Birth Control League. With the encouragement of Margaret Sanger, Yarros opened a birth control clinic at Hull House. It was the second such clinic in the United States. The clinic, which provided married females with diaphragms, faced criticism from Chicago's health commissioner, Herman N. Bundesen. However, similar clinics were established across the city in a short time.

An advocate for sexually informed women, Yarros wrote Modern Woman and Sex in 1933, which was reissued a few years later as Sex Problems in Modern Marriage. She was one of the founders of the ASHA and she served as the first vice-president of the Illinois Social Hygiene League. As an arm of the latter organization, Yarros founded the nation's first premarital and marital counseling clinic.

Even most of the membership of the ASHA supported eugenics, so they did not fully consider the sex education needs of minorities. Compounding the problem, as people realized that American soldiers were returning from World War I infected with syphilis, they were focused on emphasizing sex education for white men. Yarros believed in and campaigned for sex education for women and minorities. "Experiences of a Lecturer", one such speech that was delivered to the ASHA membership in 1918, was later published in the journal Social Hygiene.

== Later life ==
In the late 1930s, Yarros moved to Winter Park, Florida. She moved again in 1941, this time to La Jolla, California. She maintained some involvement in social and civic causes even late in life, chairing the Russian Relief Committee of La Jolla and serving as vice-president of the San Diego Social Hygiene Association. Victor Yarros, who had at one time been a law partner of Clarence Darrow, lived until 1956. They had one adopted daughter named Elise.

Yarros died in San Diego in 1946 of heart failure; she had suffered a heart attack several years earlier. Her obituary quoted a passage from an unpublished autobiography, which said that "the enlightened, socially minded doctor will sympathize with labor, with victims of exploitation and industrial autocracy, with the juvenile and adult delinquents who are the products of slums and blighted, ugly, depressing districts. He will work and fight for ripe and genuine reforms."
