= Myra (given name) =

- Gender: Female

Other names
- Related names: Miranda, Mira, Myron

The name Myra was created by the 17th-century poet Fulke Greville 1st Barone Brooke (1554–1628). Its origins are unknown, though some speculate the created name is an anagram of the name Mary, a variant spelling of the Latin word myrrha, meaning myrrh, a fragrant resin obtained from a tree, or derived from the Latin mirari, meaning wonder, the same source from which William Shakespeare derived the invented name Miranda.

== Origin and meaning ==
- English meaning of the name Myra for a girl: poetic invention
- Greek meaning of the name Myra for a girl: myrrh, an aromatic shrub. Myra is associated with the same "myrrh" that, according to Matthew, was brought as a gift to the infant Jesus by the Magi, along with gold and frankincense.
- Latin meaning of the name Myra for a girl: variation of Miranda, admirable, extraordinary
- Arabic meaning of the name Myra for a girl : Aristocratic Lady
- Hebrew meaning of the name Myra for a girl : Seadew
- Biblical meaning of the name Myra for a girl : I flow, pour out, weep
- Sanskrit meaning of the name Myra for a girl : Beloved, Favorable, Admirable.
- Japanese Kanji meaning of the name Maira 舞良: 舞 means "dance." 良 means "good."

== Distribution ==
The table below provides a detailed overview of the popularity of the female name Myra and variants of this in some of the countries where statistics are available.

Land	Name form	Number of women	Percentage of women	Ranking women	Number of girls	Percentage of girls	Ranking girls
Saint Lucia	Myra	(2005)	that. 0.4%	that. 4 .			
Honduras	Maira				(2010)		9.
India	Myra				(2012)		12.
Ecuador	Mayra	20 664 (2013)	0,3 %	24.			
India	Mayra				(2012)		25.
Zimbabwe	Moira	(2012)	that. 0.4%	that. 32 .			
Nicaragua	Mayra	7 128 (2003)	0,2 %	33.			
Colombia	Maira	(2010)	that. 0.3%	50.			
Argentina	Maira	(2005)	that. 0.3%	91.			
South Africa	Moira	that. 100,000 (2012)	that. 0.6%	that. 93 .			
Philippines	Myra	that. 80,000 (2012)	that. 0.2%	that. 169 .			
Great Britain	Moira	that. 40,000 (2005)	that. 0.1%	that. 187 .			
Great Britain	Myra	that. 30,000 (2005)	that. 0.08%	that. 225 .			
Germany	Maira				(2012)		324.
USA	Myra	60 386 (1990)	0,04 %	385.			
Germany	Mayra				(2012)		420.
Sweden	Myra				13 (2012)	0,03 %	472.
Netherlands	Mayra				26 (2007)	0,03 %	512.
USA	Mayra	27 174 (1990)	0,02 %	635.			
Netherlands	Myra				15 (2007)	0,02 %	806.
Netherlands	Moira				14 (2007)	0,02 %	846.

== People ==
=== Actresses ===
- Myra Turley, American actress
- Myra Keaton (1877–1955), American actress
- Myra Hemmings (1895–1968), American actress
- Myra Carter (1930–2016), American actress
- Myra De Groot (1937–1988), British actress
- Myra Frances (1943–2021), British actress
- Myra McFadyen (1956–2024), Scottish actress
- Myra Singh Indian child actress

=== Musicians ===
- Myra Melford (born 1957), American jazz pianist and composer
- Myra Taylor (singer) (1917–2011), American jazz singer and songwriter
- Myra Hess (1890–1965), British pianist
- Myra Maimoh (born 1982), Cameroon singer
- Myra Merritt, American operatic soprano
- Myra Molloy (born 1997), Thai singer-songwriter and actress
- Myra Mortimer (1894–1972), American contralto
- Myra Brooks Turner (1936–2017), American composer and music educator
- Myra Barnes, the birth name of Vicki Anderson (1939–2023), American soul singer
- Myra Ruiz (born 1993), Brazilian Actress and Singer

=== Politics ===
- Myra Barry (born 1957), Irish Fine Gael politician
- Myra Jehlen, American Board of Governors Professor of English at Rutgers University in New Brunswick, New Jersey
- Myra Virginia Simmons (1880–1965), American suffragist
- Myra Freeman (born 1949), Lieutenant Governor of Nova Scotia
- Myra Ndjoku Manianga, Congo politician
- Myra McDaniel (1932–2010), the first African American to be the Secretary of State of Texas
- Myra Tanner Weiss (1917–1997), American Trotskyist
- Myra Crownover (born 1947), American politician
- Myra C. Selby (born 1955), American former nominee to be a United States Circuit Judge
- Myra Wolfgang (1914–1976), American labor leader and women's rights activist between the 1930s and 1970s
- Myra Sadd Brown (1872–1938), British campaigner for women's rights, an activist and internationalist
- Myra Curtis (1886–1971), British civil servant

=== Sports ===
- Myra Moller (born 1984), New Zealander cyclist
- Myra Wood, American lawn bowls international
- Myra Lakdawala, American-born former athlete for Pakistan
- Myra Nimmo (born 1954), Scottish athlete and academic
- Myra Blackwelder (born 1955), American professional golfer

=== Writers ===
- Myra Schneider (born 1936), British poet
- Myra Sklarew (1934–2024), American poet, teacher and biologist
- Myra Morris (1893–1966), Australian poet, novelist, and writer for children
- Myra Taylor (scriptwriter) (1934–2012), British television scriptwriter
- Myra MacPherson (1934–2026), American journalist, author and biographer
- Myra Kelly (1875–1910), Irish-American author and schoolteacher
- Myra Nye (1875–1955), American writer
- Myra Bairstow, American writer
- Myra Bradwell (1831–1894), American publisher and political activist
- Myra Douglas (1844–?), American writer, poet
- Myra Sajid (born Sajid Zaki), Pakistani dramatist, playwright and scriptwriter
- Myra Orth (1934–2002), American art historian
- Myra Belle Martin (1861–?), American teacher, writer, and financier
- Myra Bradwell Helmer Pritchard (1889–1947), American writer and golfer
- Myra Gale Brown (born 1944), American author
- Myra Roper (1911–2002), British-born Australian author and broadcaster

=== Other ===
- Myra MacDonald, Scottish journalist
- Myra Louise Bunce (1854–1919), English designer and painter
- Myra Bennett (1890–1990), British celebrated nurse
- Myra Albert Wiggins (1869–1956), American painter and pictorial photographer who became a member of the important early 20th century Photo-Secession movement
- Myra Kukiiyaut (1929–2006), Inuk artist
- Myra Landau (1926–2018), Romanian-born artist and abstract painter
- Myra Juliet Farrell (1878–1957), Australian visionary, inventor and artist
- Myra Louise Taylor (1881–1939), British nursing superintendent
- Myra English (1933–2001), Hawaiian entertainer and celebrity tourism promoter
- Myra Hindley (1942–2002), English serial killer, known as one of the perpetrators of the Moors murders
- Myra Wilson, British computer scientist
- Myra Soble (1904–1992), Russian spy
- Myra Marx Ferree (born 1949), former professor of sociology and director of the Center for German and European Studies
- Myra Hart, founder of Staples Inc.
- Myra Kinch (1904–1981), American dancer
- Myra Knox (1853–1915), Canadian-born American physician
- Myra Kraft (1942–2011), American philanthropist
- Myra Shackley (born 1949), British professor
- Myra Reynolds (1853–1936), American literary scholar
- Myra Reynolds Richards (1882–1934), American sculptor and teacher
- Myra Sidharta (born 1927), Chinese psychologist
- Myra B. Spafard (1864–1940), American artist
- Myra Clark Gaines (1804–1885), American socialite and plaintiff
- Myra Kingman (1873–1922), American journalist
- Myra Smith Kearse (1899–1982), American physician and community leader in New Jersey
- Myra Adele Logan (1908–1977), American physician, surgeon and anatomist who was the first woman to perform open heart surgery
- Myra Butter (1925–2022), British aristocrat and thoroughbred racehorse owner
- Myra Greene is an American photographer

== Fictional characters ==
- Myra, a minor character in the Divergent books
- Myra Booth, a character in TV series Coronation Street
- Myra Breckinridge, the name of the main character and 1968 novel by Gore Vidal
- Myra Bruhl, a character in the play Deathtrap and in the film version with the same name
- Myra Castellanos, a character in the video game series The Evil Within
- Myra Driscoll Henshawe, a character in the 1926 novel My Mortal Enemy by Willa Carther
- Myra Licht, a character in the BBC comedy series Episodes
- Myra McQueen, a character in TV series Hollyoaks
- Myra Menke, a character in the book Holes by Louis Sachar
- Myra Monkhouse, a character in TV series Family Matters
- Myra Santelli, from the 2012 movie Girl vs. Monster
- Myra Sokolov, a character in the animated series Totally Spies!

== See also ==
- Myra (disambiguation)
