= Christopher Thrower =

American lawyer and legislator

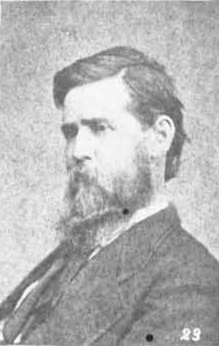
Christopher Thrower (Circa 1877)

Christopher Thrower (died March 17, 1883) was a lawyer, soldier, newspaper editor, judge, and state legislator in Arkansas.

He served with the Camden Knights during the American Civil War.

He served two terms in the Arkansas Senate before moving to Hot Springs, Arkansas and becoming a judge. In the wake of the U.S. Supreme Court's Bradwell v. Illinois limiting application of the 14th Amendment, he introduced legislation in 1873 barring women from obtaining law licenses by limiting licenses to male citizens. The bill became law.
