= Myra (disambiguation) =

Myra was a city in Lycia in what is today Turkey.

Myra may also refer to:

== People ==
- Myra (given name), a female given name in the English-speaking world
- Myra (rapper) (born 1994), Norwegian rapper Regina Tucker
- Myra (singer) (born 1986), Mexican American pop singer Mayra Ambriz

== Places ==
=== United States ===
- Myra, Kentucky, an unincorporated community
- Myra Arboretum, Larimore, North Dakota
- Myra, Texas, an unincorporated community
- Myra, West Virginia, an unincorporated community
- Myra, Wisconsin, an unincorporated community

=== Other places ===
- Mount Myra, a mountain in British Columbia, Canada
- Myra, Norway, a village
- Myra Station, Norway, a former railway station

== Other uses ==
- myRA (My Retirement Account), a type of Roth IRA account in the United States
- MYRA School of Business, a business school in Mysore, India
- Myra (crab), a genus of crabs
- Myra (painting), a 1995 painting by Marcus Harvey
- Myra (album), singer Myra's 2001 debut album
- Myra, one of the two Israeli offshore exploratory drilling licenses Sara and Myra

== See also ==
- Mira (disambiguation)
- Myra Falls (disambiguation)
