= Bradwell v. Illinois =

- Supreme Court of the United States

Argued January 18, 1873 Decided April 15, 1873
- Full case name: Myra Bradwell v. State of Illinois
- Citations: 83 U.S. 130 (more) 16 Wall. 130; 21 L. Ed. 442; 1873 U.S. LEXIS 1140

Case history
- Prior: Application denied, sub nom., In re Bradwell, 55 Ill. 535 (1869)
- Subsequent: None

Holding
- Illinois constitutionally denied law licenses to women, because the right to practice law was not one of the privileges and immunities guaranteed by the Fourteenth Amendment. Illinois Supreme Court affirmed.

Court membership
- Chief Justice Salmon P. Chase Associate Justices Nathan Clifford · Noah H. Swayne; Samuel F. Miller · David Davis; Stephen J. Field · William Strong; Joseph P. Bradley · Ward Hunt

Case opinions
- Majority: Miller, joined by Clifford, Davis, Strong, Hunt
- Concurrence: Bradley, joined by Swayne, Field
- Dissent: Chase

Laws applied
- U.S. Const. amend. XIV

Bradwell v. State of Illinois, 83 U.S. (16 Wall.) 130 (1873), was a United States Supreme Court case which ruled that women were not granted the right to practice a profession under the United States Constitution. The case was brought to the court by Myra Bradwell, who sought to be admitted to the bar to practice law in Illinois. The Court ruled that the Privileges and Immunities Clause of the Fourteenth Amendment did not include the right to practice a profession as a woman. This court case was a Fourteenth Amendment challenge to sex discrimination in the United States, and it no longer reflects current legal standards as current Title VII Laws restrict employment discrimination based on gender.

== Background of the case ==
Myra Bradwell began informally practicing law in 1852 as an apprenticeship to her attorney, husband, James Bradwell. At the age of thirty-eight, in 1869, she met the Illinois bar requirements, but despite fulfilling the Illinois statute requirements of good standing character and sufficient training, she was denied the right to practice law due to her gender.

After bringing suit, she received a ruling from the Illinois Supreme Court that her rejection was a result of her "marital disability". Her ability to practice law was restricted due to the fact that she was a married woman. The Illinois Supreme Court cited the legal doctrine of feme covert, a common law principle, which granted a woman's legal standing to her husband upon marriage. This meant that Myra Bradwell did not have a legal existence apart from her husband.

Bradwell appealed to the United States Supreme Court, arguing that the Privileges and Immunities Clause of the Fourteenth Amendment protected her right to pursue a lawful profession like any other citizen, regardless of her sex or marital status. Bradwell argued that as a citizen of the United States, she was entitled to the rights and privileges afforded to citizens, including the right to practice law. Lastly, Bradwell argued that the Illinois Court decision based on feme covert was outdated and that her marital status did not correlate with her ability to practice law.

== Decision ==
=== Majority ===
In an 8-1 decision, the United States Supreme Court upheld the Illinois ruling, denying Bradwell the right to practice law. The majority opinion, written by Justice Samuel Freeman Miller, stated that the right to practice law was not protected by the Privileges or Immunities Clause of the Fourteenth Amendment, as it was not considered a fundamental right of U.S. citizenship. The court emphasized that the power to regulate professions, including setting qualifications for the legal profession, fell under the jurisdiction of individual states.

The Court first rejected Bradwell's claim that her rights were violated under Article IV, Section 2 of the U.S. Constitution, which guarantees citizens of each state the "privileges and immunities" of citizens in other states. Since Bradwell was a resident and citizen of Illinois, the Court concluded that this provision did not apply to her case. As Justice Miller stated, "The protection designed by that clause, as has been repeatedly held, has no application to a citizen of the state whose laws are complained of"(Page 83 U.S. 138). The clause was designed to protect citizens when they traveled to other states, not to protect citizens from discriminatory laws within their own state.

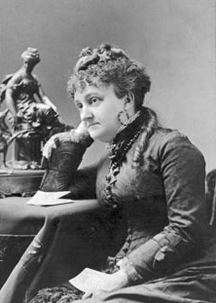
Photo of Myra Bradwell c. 1870

The Court also dismissed Bradwell's argument that the Fourteenth Amendment's Privileges and Immunities Clause had been violated. The justices held that the right to practice law was not among the rights associated with U.S. citizenship. As Justice Miller wrote, “The right to admission to practice in the courts of a state is not one of [the privileges and immunities of U.S. citizenship]... this his right in no sense depends on the citizenship of the United States”(Page 83 U.S. 139). Furthermore, the Court emphasized that the power of a state to prescribe qualifications for admission to the bar was unaffected by the Fourteenth Amendment. The ability to set criteria for those wishing to enter the legal profession was squarely within state authority, and the federal government had no basis for interfering in this matter. The Court pointed to the recently decided Slaughter-House Cases to support its position, which clarified the limited scope of federal authority over state-regulated privileges. According to this precedent, the right to regulate professional admissions fell within the state's jurisdiction, and states could determine qualifications without federal intervention.

=== Concurrence ===
Associate Justice Joseph P. Bradley concurred with the Court's decision, basing his decision on the natural differences between men and women. He argued that it was not a fundamental right or privilege for women to be admitted to every profession, particularly those requiring special qualifications and responsibilities such as the practice of law. Justice Bradley's decision was based on the perception of traditional gender roles, yet he also relied on the precedent of the limited scope federal authority had over state-regulated privileges.

This decision was a landmark in the judiciary upholding gender discrimination, which reaffirmed the states' authority in determining qualifications for professions. This decision reflects how societal norms regarding gender roles influenced judicial reasoning, reinforcing the view that women were naturally unfit for participation in certain aspects of public life, including the practice of law.

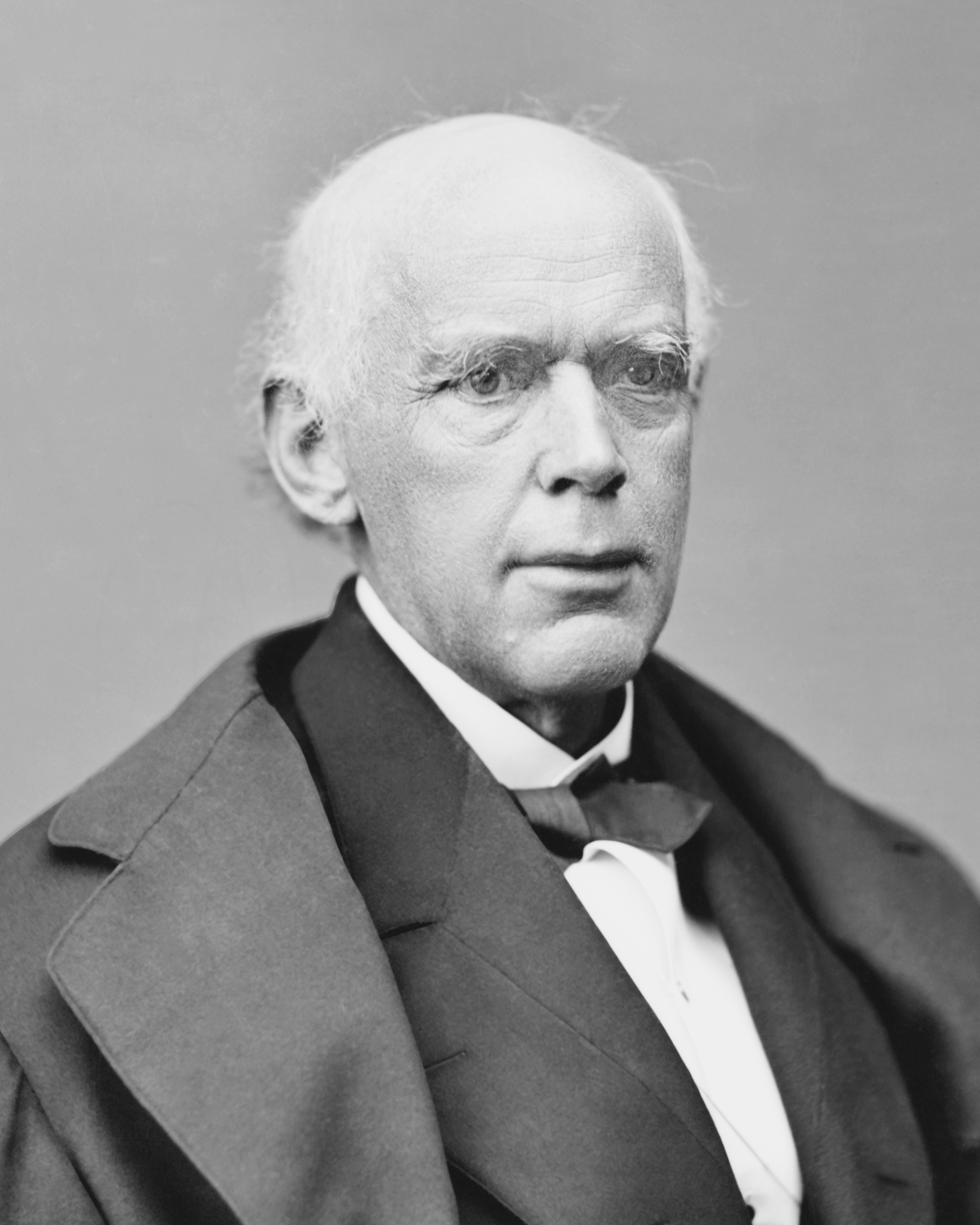
Chief Justice Salmon P. Chase in 1870

=== Dissent ===
Chief Justice Salmon P. Chase dissented from the Court's decision, but he was too ill to elaborate. Throughout his life, he had advocated for women's suffrage.

== Aftermath ==
The decision in Bradwell v. Illinois no longer reflects the current legal understanding of gender discrimination. Over time, significant legal changes have expanded rights and opportunities for women. The ratification of the Nineteenth Amendment in 1920, which granted women the right to vote, was an important step in increasing women's political influence and advancing gender equality. Subsequent civil rights movements in the 20th century further challenged discriminatory practices, and in 1964, Title VII of the Civil Rights Act was enacted, prohibiting employment discrimination based on sex. This law allowed women to enter all professions, including law, reversing the legal precedents that allowed states to impose gender-based restrictions.

Several landmark Supreme Court cases have since overturned the principles set by Bradwell v. Illinois. In Reed v. Reed (1971), the Court ruled that gender discrimination violated the Equal Protection Clause of the Fourteenth Amendment, establishing a critical precedent against gender-based classifications. This was followed by Frontiero v. Richardson (1973) and Craig v. Boren (1976) which introduced the standard of intermediate scrutiny for gender-based discrimination. Under this standard, states must demonstrate that any gender-based law serves an important government interest and is substantially related to achieving that interest. Therefore, the state currently needs to demonstrate an actual rational basis for arguing in favor of gender-based discrimination instead of relying on traditional norms.

The evolution from Bradwell v. Illinois to these later rulings reflects broader shifts in American constitutional interpretation, moving from an era of restrictive gender-based legal doctrines to one focused on expanding equality. Today, the principles underlying Bradwell have been completely overturned, and women are no longer barred from full participation in the professional workforce, including the legal profession.

== See also ==
- List of United States Supreme Court cases, volume 83
