= Ambrotype =

Variant of the wet plate collodion process

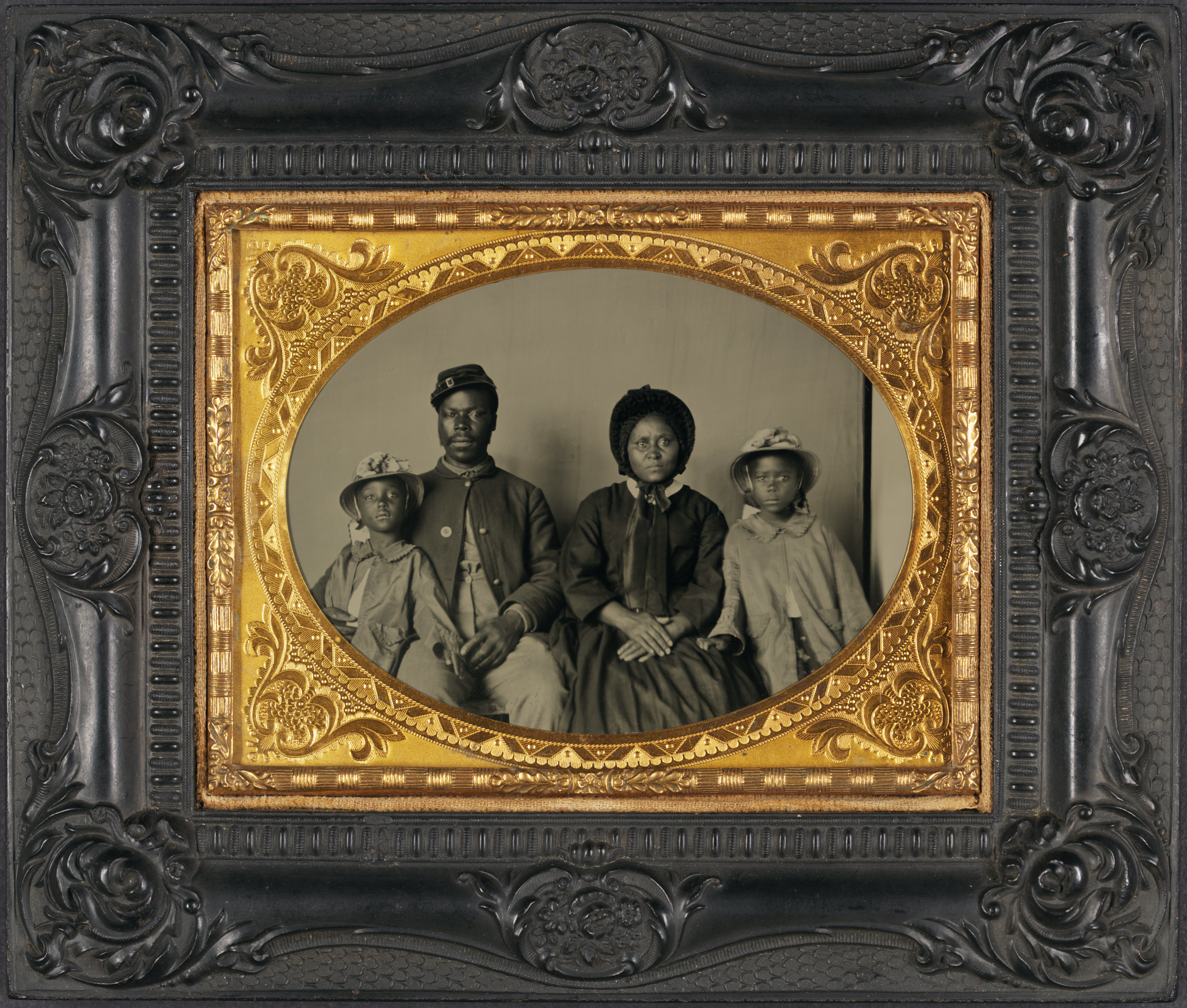
Many ambrotypes were made by unknown photographers, such as this American example of a Union soldier (Sgt. Samuel Smith, 119th USCT) with his family, c. 1863–65. Because of their fragility, ambrotypes were usually kept in folding cases like those used for daguerreotypes. This example is framed for display.

The ambrotype, also known as a collodion positive in the United Kingdom, is a positive photograph on glass made by a variant of the wet plate collodion process. As a cheaper alternative to the French daguerreotype, ambrotypes came to replace them. Like a print on paper, it is viewed by reflected light. Like the daguerreotype or the prints produced by a Polaroid camera, each is a unique original that could be duplicated only by using a camera to copy it.

The ambrotype was introduced in the 1850s. During the 1860s it was superseded by the tintype, a similar photograph on thin black-lacquered iron, hard to distinguish from an ambrotype if under glass.

The term ambrotype comes from Ancient Greek: ἄμβροτος ambrotos, "immortal", and τύπος typos, "impression".

== Process ==
One side of a clean glass plate was coated with a thin layer of iodized collodion, then dipped in a silver nitrate solution. The plate was exposed in the camera while still wet. Exposure times varied from five to sixty seconds or more depending on the brightness of the lighting and the speed of the camera lens. The plate was then developed and fixed. The resulting negative, when viewed by reflected light against a black background, appears to be a positive image: the clear areas look black, and the exposed, opaque areas appear relatively light. This effect was integrated by backing the plate with black velvet; by taking the picture on a plate made of dark reddish-colored glass (the result was called a ruby ambrotype); or by coating one side of the plate with black varnish. Either the emulsion side or the bare side could be coated: if the bare side was blackened, the thickness of the glass added a sense of depth to the image. In either case, another plate of glass was put over the fragile emulsion side to protect it, and the whole was mounted in a metal frame and kept in a protective case. In some instances the protective glass was cemented directly to the emulsion, generally with a balsam resin. This protected the image well but tended to darken it. Ambrotypes were sometimes hand-tinted; untinted ambrotypes are monochrome, gray or tan in their lightest areas.

== History ==
The ambrotype was based on the wet plate collodion process invented by Frederick Scott Archer. Ambrotypes were deliberately underexposed negatives made by that process and optimized for viewing as positives instead. In the US, ambrotypes first came into use in the early 1850s. In 1854, James Ambrose Cutting of Boston took out several patents relating to the process. Although Cutting, the patent holder, had named the process after himself, it appears the term, "ambrotype" itself may have been coined in the gallery of Marcus Aurelius Root, a well-known daguerreotypist, as documented in his 1864 book The Camera and the Pencil as follows:

"After considerable improvements, this process was first introduced, in 1854, into various Daguerrean establishments, in the Eastern and Western States, by Cutting & Rehn. In June of this year, Cutting procured patents for the process, though Langdell had already worked it from the printed formulas.

"The process has since been introduced, as a legitimate business, into the leading establishments of our country. The positive branch of it; i.e. a solar impression upon one glass-plate, which is covered by a second hermetically sealed thereto, is entitled the "Ambrotype," (or the "imperishable picture"), a name devised in my gallery."

Root also states (pp. 373): "Isaac Rehn, formerly a successful daguerreotypist, in company with Cutting, of Boston, perfected and introduced through the United States the "Ambrotype," or the positive on glass." What isn't mentioned in the referenced book is the particular year in which the term "ambrotype" was first used.

Ambrotypes were much less expensive to produce than daguerreotypes, the medium that predominated when they were introduced, and did not have the bright mirror-like metallic surface that could make daguerreotypes troublesome to view and which some people disliked. An ambrotype, however, appeared dull and drab when compared with the brilliance of a well-made and properly viewed daguerreotype.

By the mid-1850s, the ambrotype vastly overtook the daguerreotype in popularity. In 1858, the New York City Police Department, inspired by the pioneering Criminal Investigation Department in Glasgow, Scotland, used ambrotypes to establish a "rogues' gallery", consisting of portraits of wanted criminals and arrested villains. By the mid-1860s, the ambrotype itself was being replaced by the tintype, a similar image on a sturdy black-lacquered thin iron sheet, as well as by photographic albumen paper prints made from glass plate collodion negatives.

Contemporary photographer Myra Greene used the ambrotype process for her series "Character Recognition" which included close-ups of her face on black glass.

== Gallery ==
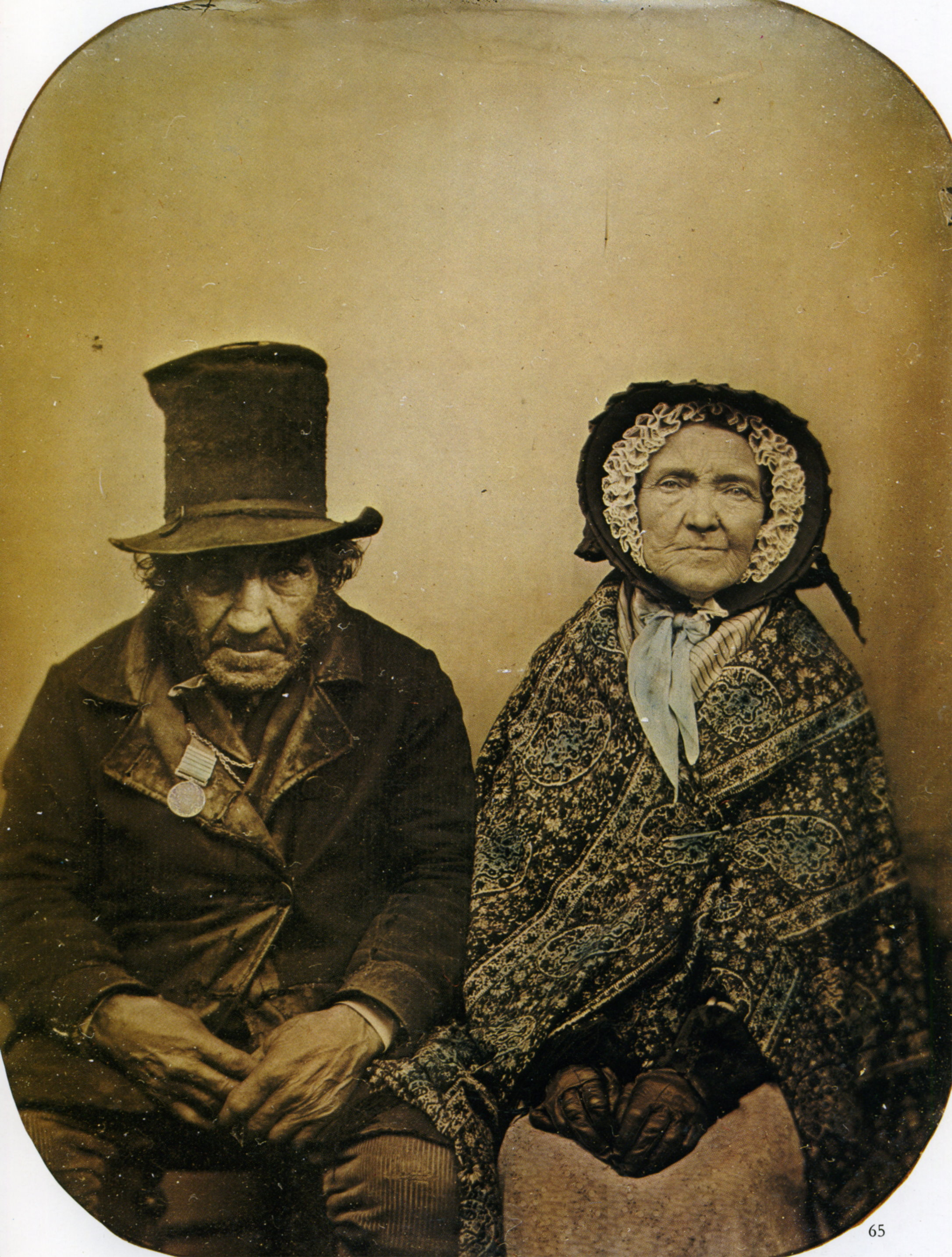
Peninsular War veteran and his wife, c. 1860, with some hand-tinting

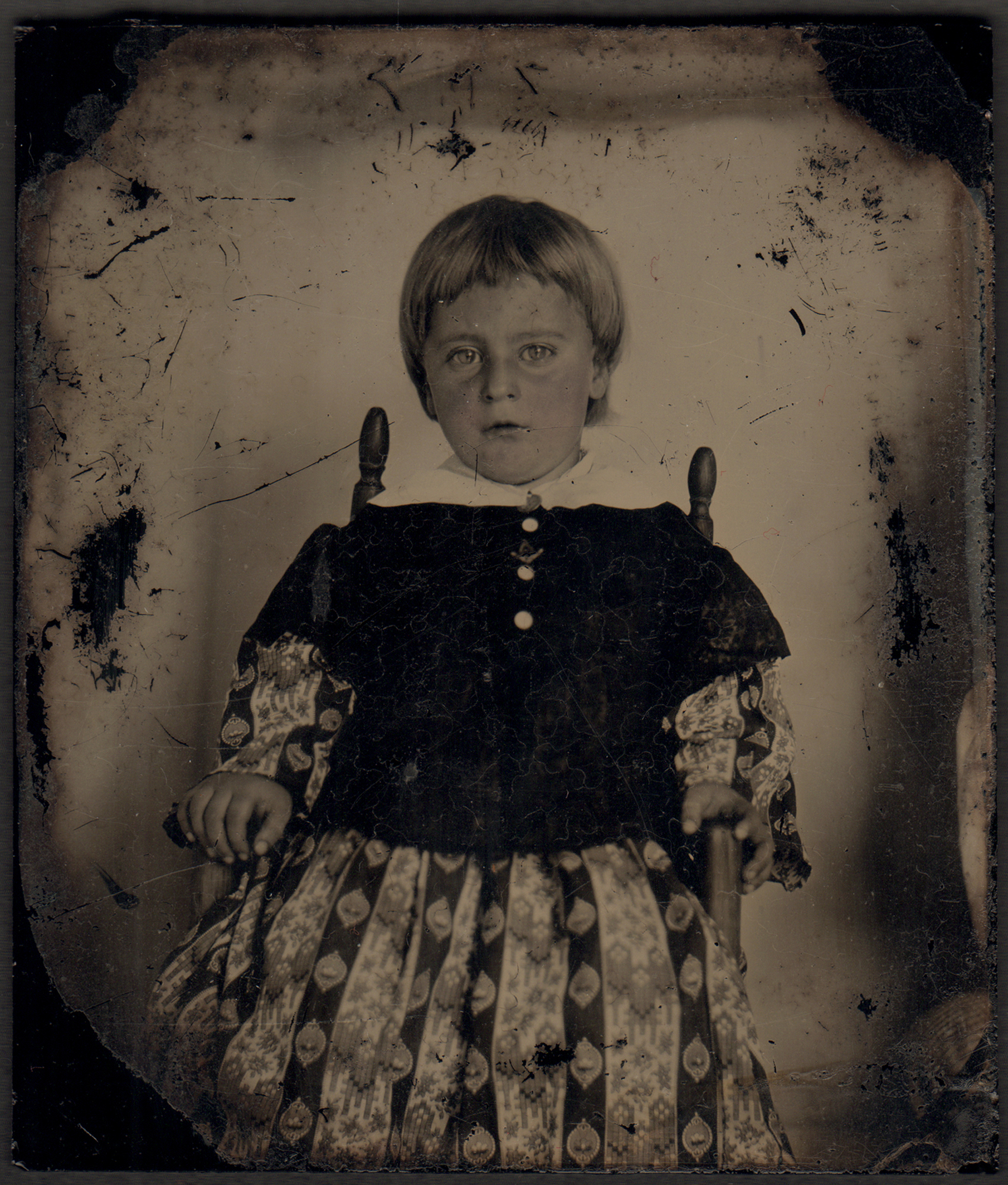
Cute Blond Boy, c. 1860

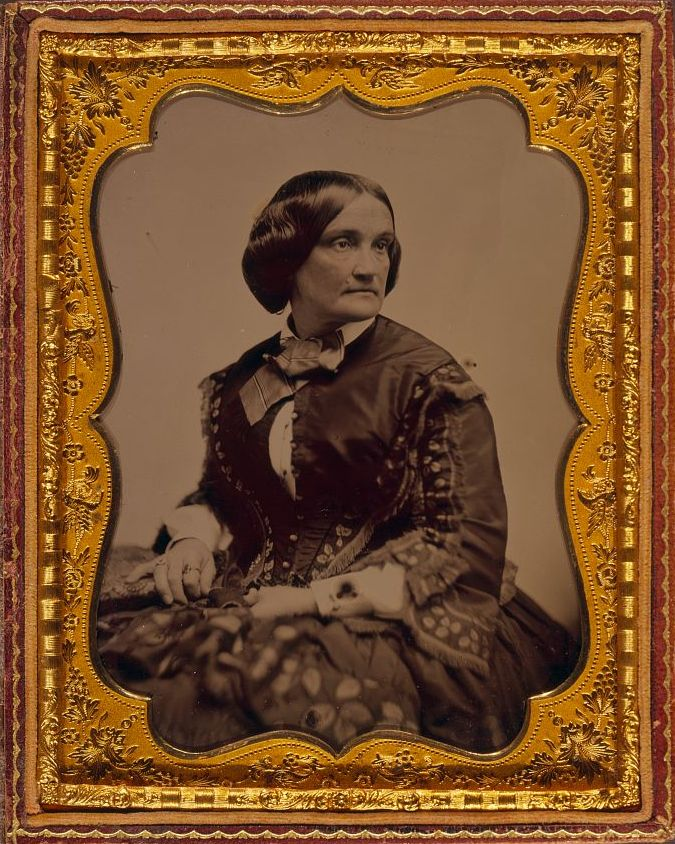
American actress Charlotte Cushman, 1859

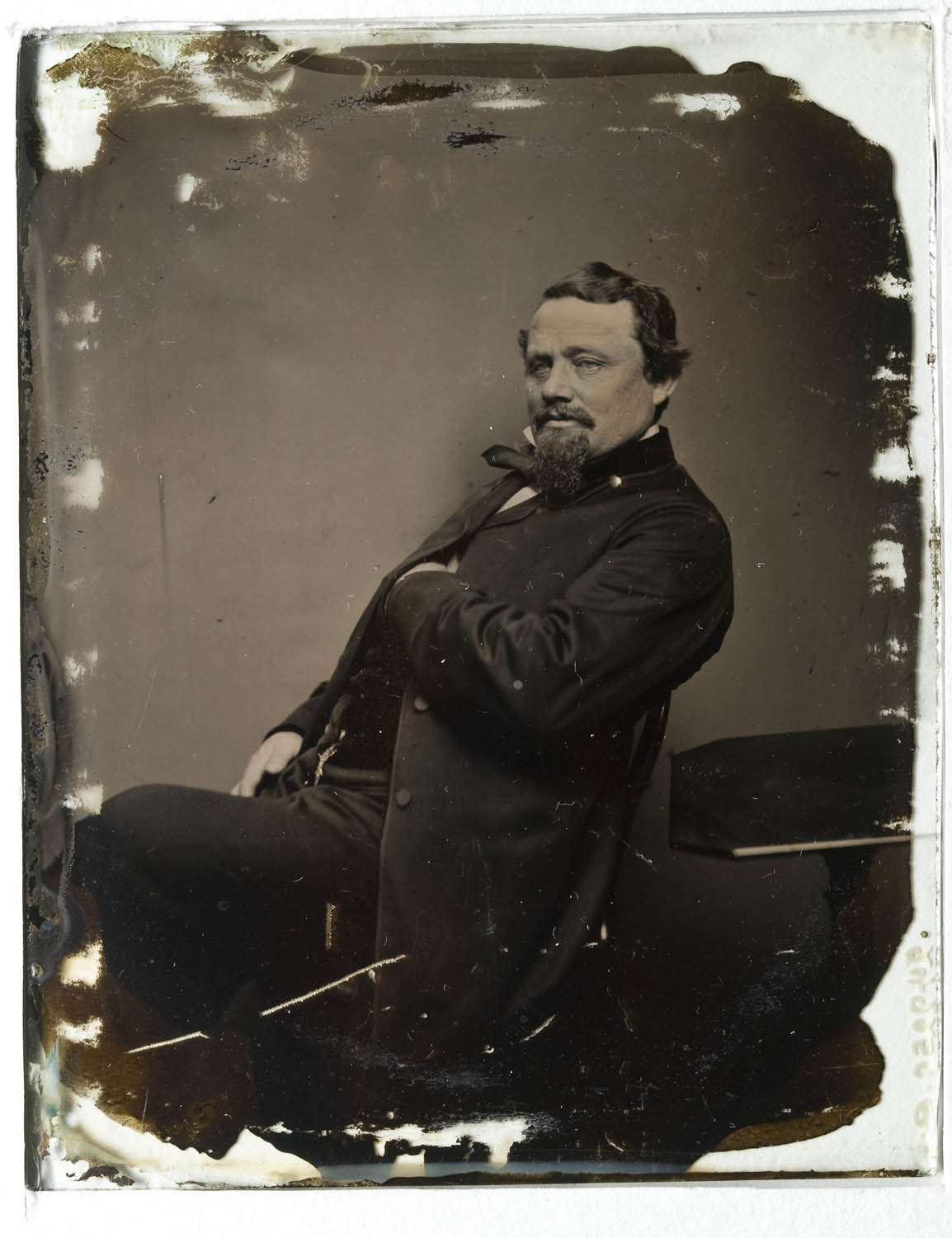
Bare ambrotype plate, c. 1860, showing damage to emulsion and varnish

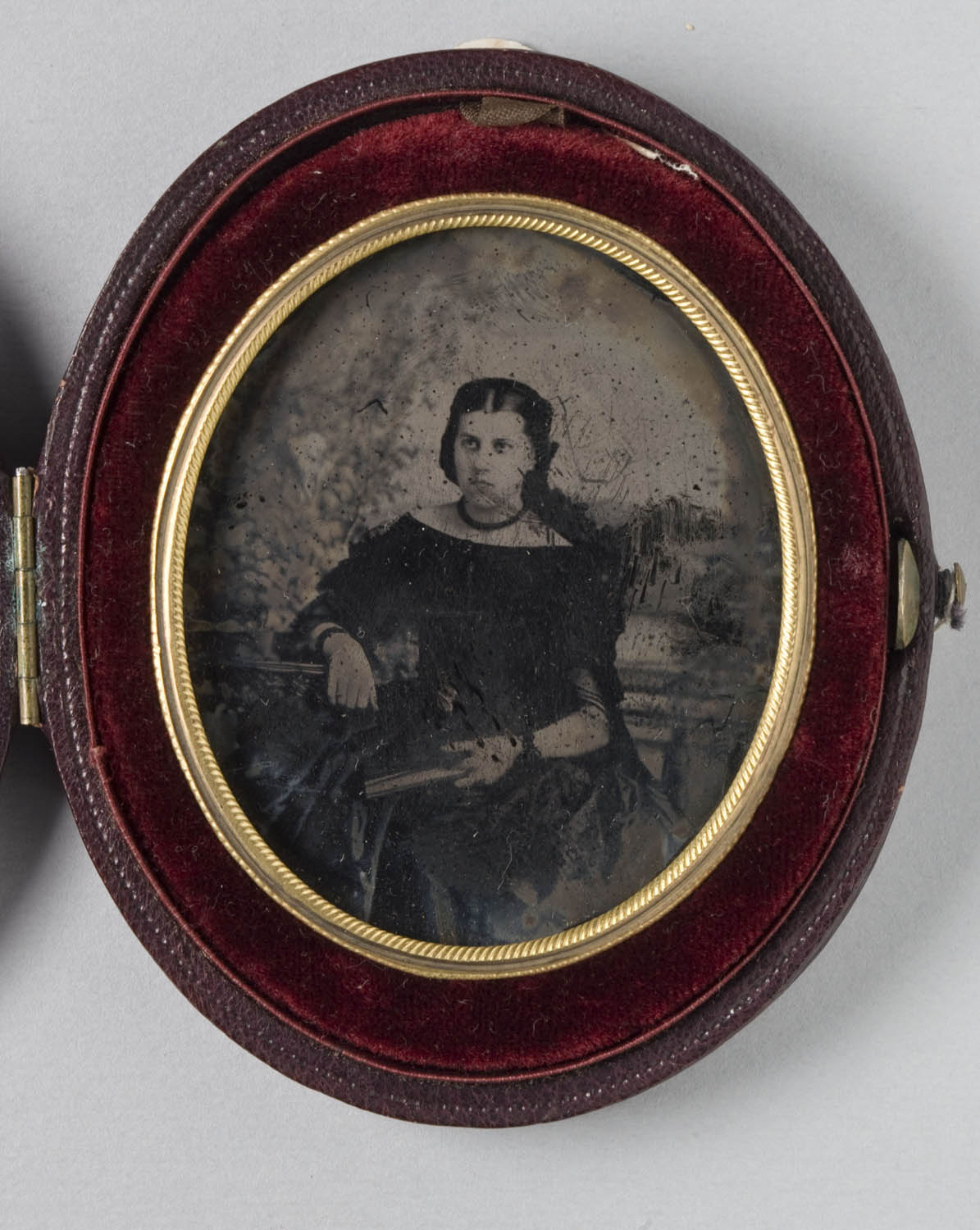
Portrait on oval glass plate, c. 1850s

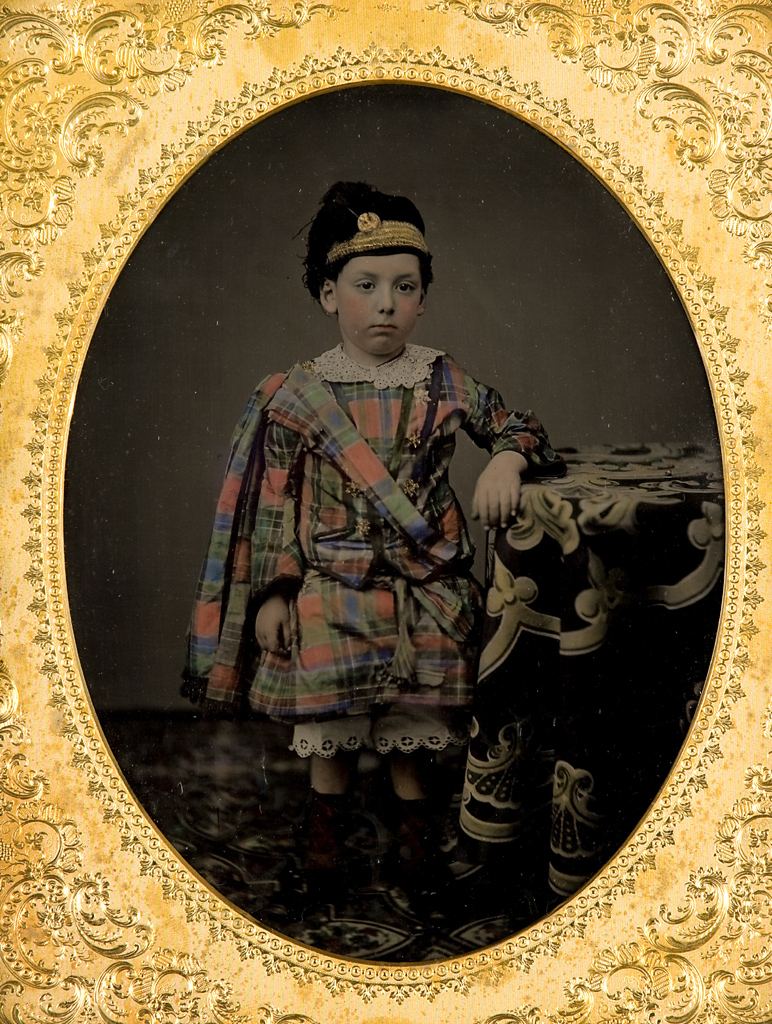
Boy with elaborately hand-tinted tartan clothing, c. 1860

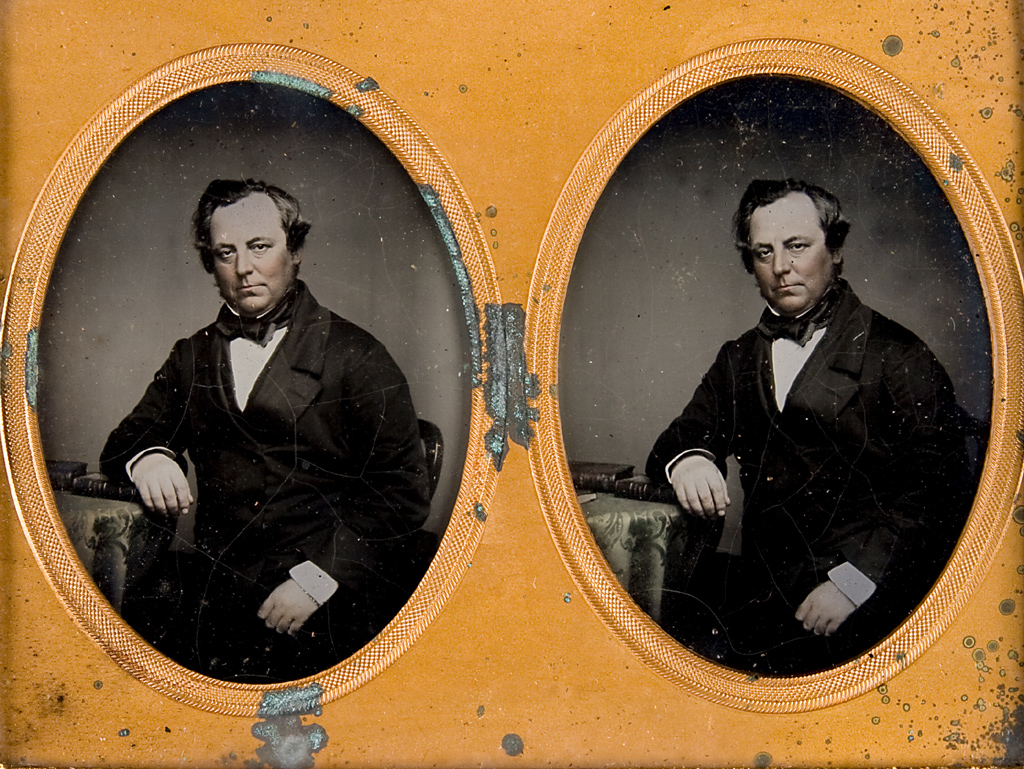
Stereoscopic portrait of a surgeon, c. 1860

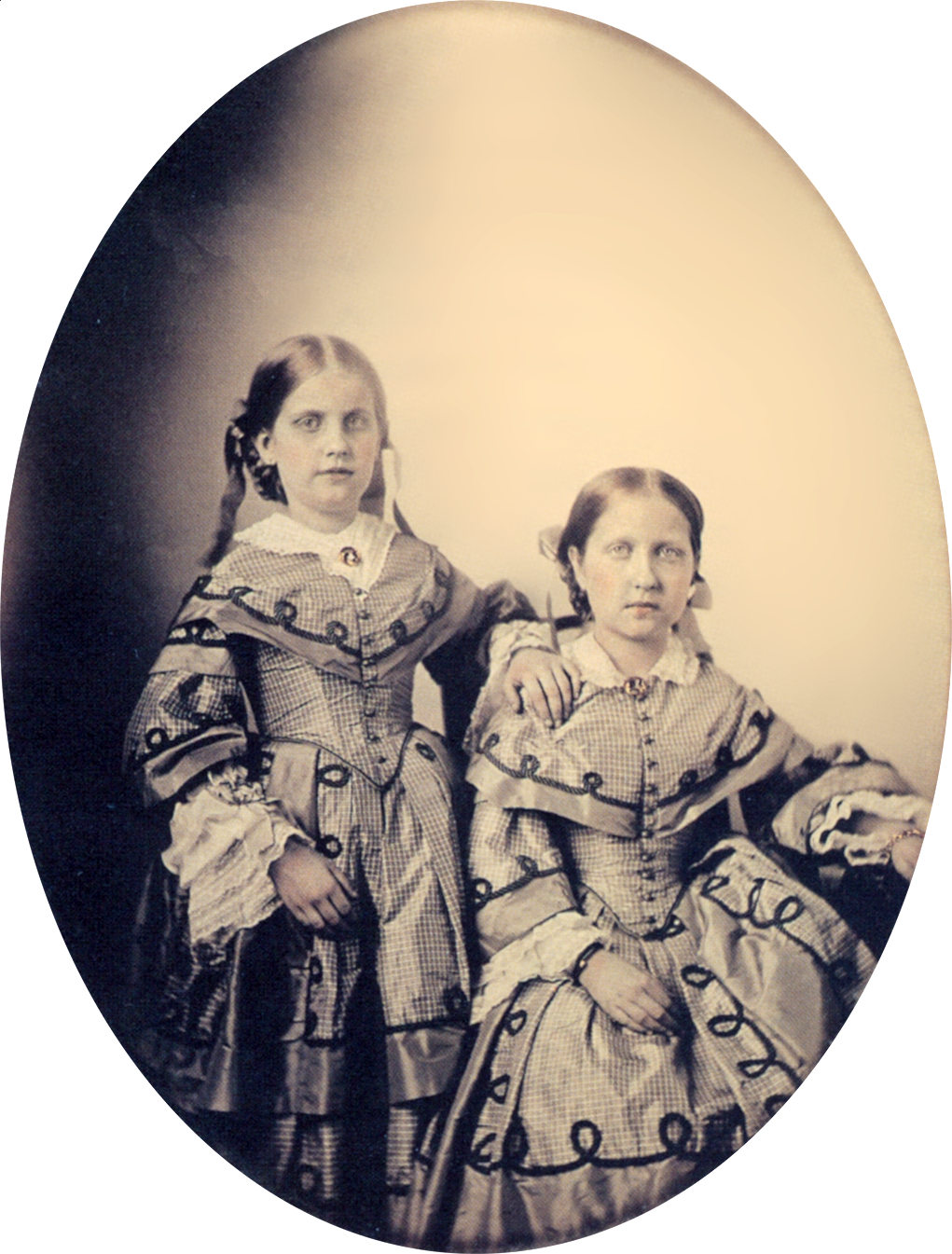
Brazilian princesses Leopoldina and Isabel (seated), 1855

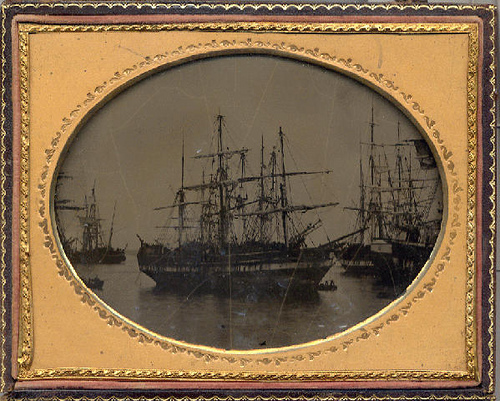
Whaling ship in Honolulu harbor, 1857

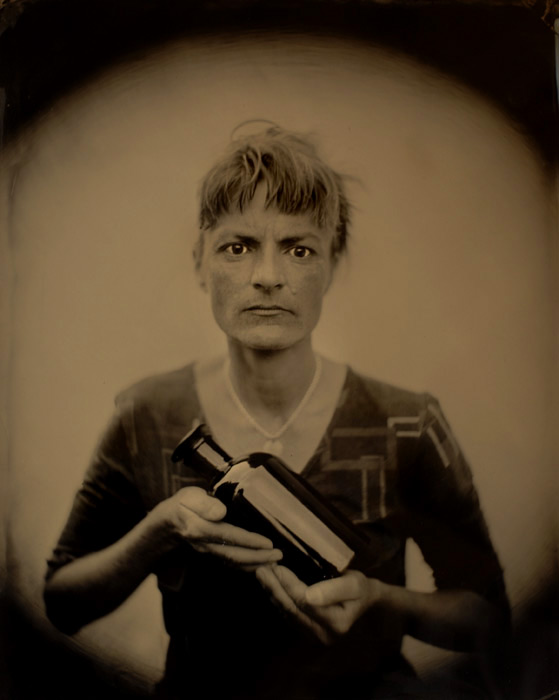
An example of a modern ambrotype, May 2007

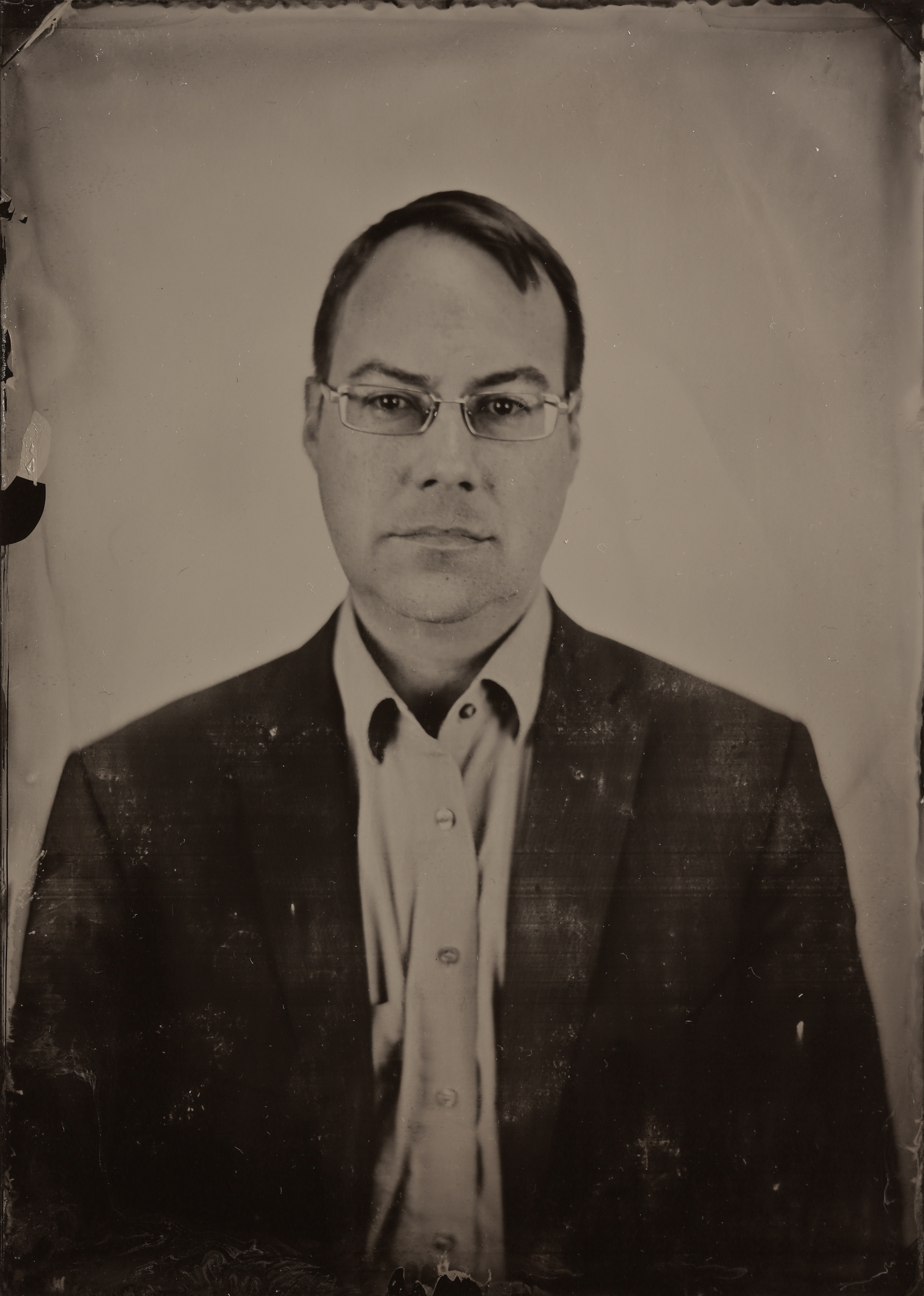
Example of a modern ambrotype, 2015

== See also ==
- Albumen print
- Calotype
- Collodion process
- Daguerreotype
- Tintype
- Lippmann plate
