= Bonnie Cooper =

American baseball player (1935–2018)

- Second baseman
- Born: March 17, 1935; Tremont, Illinois, U.S.
- Died: November 8, 2018 (aged 83); Tremont, Illinois, U.S.
- Batted: Right Threw: Right

Teams
- Battle Creek Belles (1952)

Career highlights and awards
- Women in Baseball – AAGPBL Permanent Display at the Baseball Hall of Fame and Museum (since 1988)

Bonnie Cooper (March 17, 1935 – November 8, 2018) was an All-American Girls Professional Baseball League player. She batted and threw right handed.

Born in Tremont, Illinois, Cooper played at second base for the Battle Creek Belles club during its 1952 season, two years before the league folded. She did not have individual records or some information was incomplete.
