= Myra Bradwell Helmer Pritchard =

American golfer and writer (1889–1947)

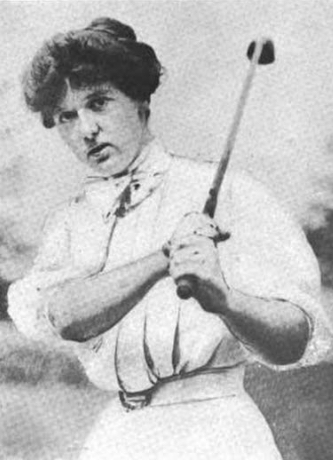
- Myra Bradwell Helmer as a golfer in 1909.
- Born: Myra Bradwell Helmer; 1889
- Died: February 3, 1947 (aged 57–58)
- Education: Vassar College
- Relatives: James B. Bradwell (grandfather); Myra Bradwell (grandmother)

Myra Bradwell Helmer Pritchard (1889 – February 3, 1947) was an American golfer and writer from Chicago. She inherited, and attempted to publish, a controversial collection of letters from Mary Todd Lincoln.

== Early life ==
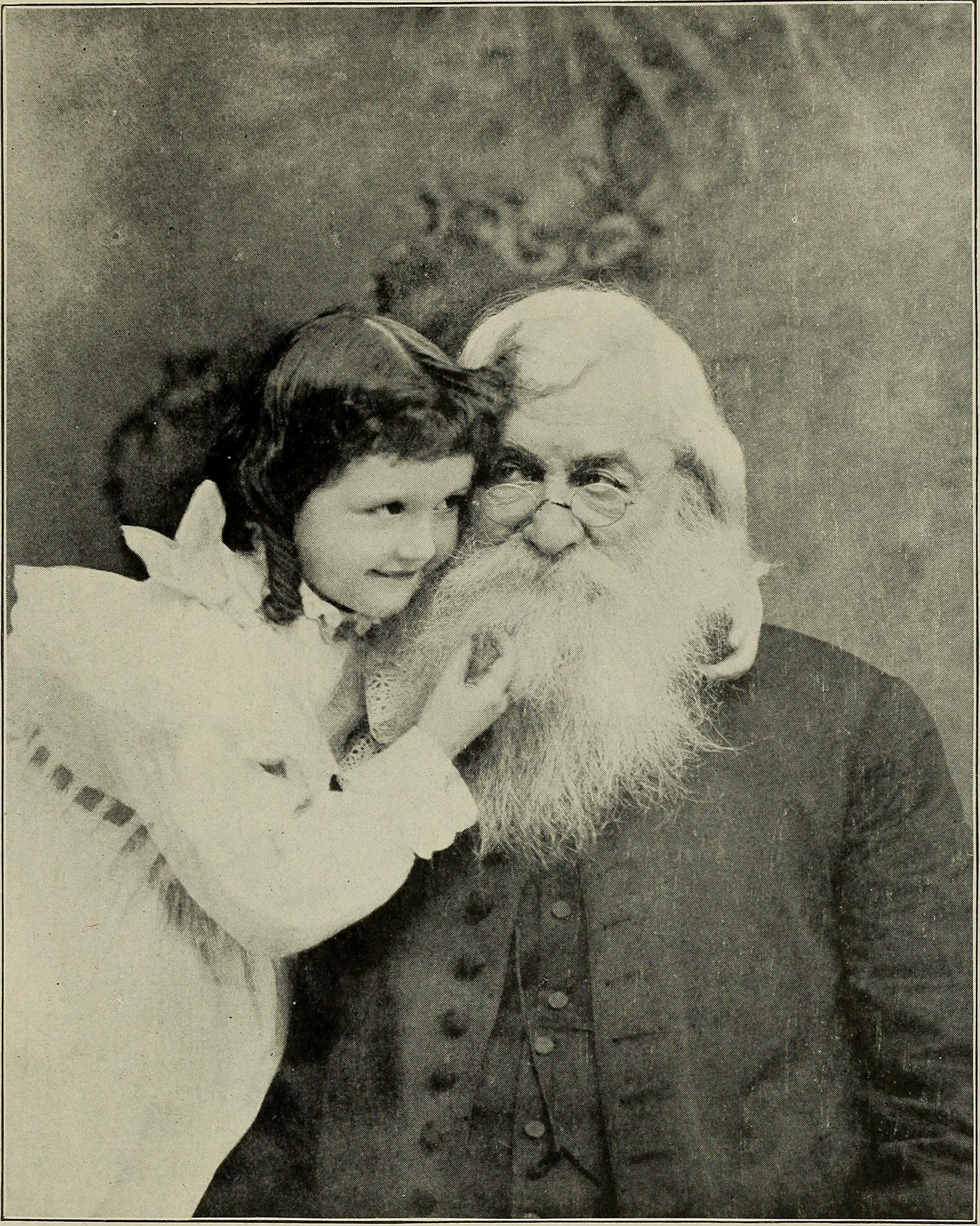
Myra Bradwell Helmer with her grandfather (and publisher), James B. Bradwell, from a 1900 publication on Illinois history.

Myra Bradwell Helmer was born in Chicago, the only child of lawyers Frank Ambrose Helmer and Bessie Bradwell Helmer. Her grandfather James B. Bradwell was a prominent Chicago attorney and abolitionist; her grandmother Myra Bradwell was a publisher and political activist in Illinois, founding editor of the Chicago Legal News in 1868. Bessie Bradwell Helmer continued publishing the Chicago Legal News until 1925, and rescued the publication's subscription book from the Great Chicago Fire in 1871. Helmer attended Mrs. Loring's School in Chicago, and graduated from Vassar College in 1910.

== Career ==
Myra Bradwell Helmer was just six years old when she became a published author. A collection of her short stories, titled Short Stories, was published by the Chicago Legal News in 1896, to raise money for the Daily News Fresh Air Fund. Medical experts raised concerns about her mental development, seeing precocity as a risk factor for early breakdown. In 1903, the teenaged Helmer published another collection, this time her poetry, verses about her family members, her pets, golf, and other topics, under the title A Child's Thoughts in Rhyme. In 1909 she co-wrote Father Gander Golf Book with Inez Lenore Klumph, again as a fundraiser for the Daily News Fresh Air Fund.

Helmer was also a golfer. She held records and championships at many of the courses in the Chicago area. In 1906, she qualified for a major championship, but had to forfeit to return to Vassar College for school. In 1913, she won the Western Championship in Memphis, Tennessee, and played at the Women's Championship that year in Delaware.

Myra Helmer Pritchard was an active member of the Chicago Woman's Club. and a contributor to Dogdom, a magazine about dogs.

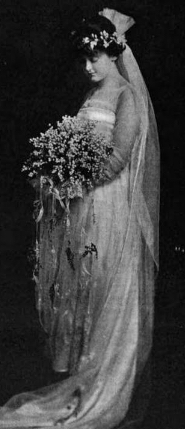
Myra Bradwell Helmer Pritchard in a bridal portrait, 1915.

== The Lincoln-Bradwell letters ==
Mary Todd Lincoln corresponded with Myra and James Bradwell, Myra Pritchard's grandparents, in the 1870s, before, during, and after her brief confinement to an insane asylum. The letters were said to reflect Mrs. Lincoln's distressed mental state and her disapproval of her son, Robert Todd Lincoln. The letters from Mrs. Lincoln to the Bradwells were left to Bradwell's daughter, Bessie Helmer, and then to Bessie's daughter, Myra Pritchard. "My mother was most anxious that these letters be published," explained Pritchard, "because she felt that Mrs. Abraham Lincoln had been maligned and that these letters would explain much of the real Mrs. Lincoln to the world and place her in a more favorable light."

Myra Pritchard wrote a book-length manuscript about these letters in 1927, but the family of Robert Lincoln threatened legal action and bought the manuscript rather than allowing its publication. Against the agreement with the Lincoln family, Myra Pritchard kept a copy of the letters and her manuscript, but ordered that it be burned upon her death. The executor of her estate, her sister-in-law Margreta Pritchard, burned the manuscript. A few years later, the sister-in-law was persuaded by a Lincoln collector to burn the typed copies of the letters as well.

Although the Bradwell-Lincoln letters and Pritchard's manuscript were believed to be completely lost, a surviving copy was discovered in 2005, in a steamer trunk belonging to a Lincoln family attorney. Myra Helmer Pritchard's 1927 manuscript was published in 2011 as The Dark Days of Abraham Lincoln's Widow, as Revealed by Her Own Letters by Southern Illinois University Press.

== Personal life ==
Myra Bradwell Helmer married a Canadian medical doctor, James Stuart Pritchard, in 1915. They were avid collie owners, and lived in Battle Creek, Michigan, where James was the president of the W. K. Kellogg Foundation. She was widowed when the doctor died from thyroid cancer in 1940, and she died in 1947, aged 57 years.
