= Tremont, Illinois =

- Village
- Location of Tremont in Tazewell County, Illinois.
- Coordinates: 40°31′37″N 89°29′40″W
- Country: United States
- State: Illinois
- County: Tazewell
- Founded: 1834
- Incorporated: July 1835

Government
  - Village President: Ken Harding

Area
  - Total: 1.19 sq mi (3.07 km^{2})
  - Land: 1.19 sq mi (3.07 km^{2})
  - Water: 0 sq mi (0.00 km^{2})
- Elevation: 650 ft (200 m)

Population (2020)
  - Total: 2,277
  - Estimate (2024): 2,247
  - Density: 1,921.2/sq mi (741.77/km^{2})
- Time zone: UTC-6 (CST)
  - Summer (DST): UTC-5 (CDT)
- ZIP code: 61568
- Area code: 309
- FIPS code: 17-75965
- GNIS feature ID: 2400000
- Website: tremontil.gov

Tremont is a village in Tazewell County, Illinois, United States. The population was 2,277 at the 2020 census. Tremont is located 14 miles southeast of Peoria.

== History ==
James Chapman settled in the Tremont area in 1820, followed by William Sterling, William and James Broyhill, Michael Trout, and David Lackland. Margaret E. Lackland was the first to be born in the new settlement. A post office was established in 1835 and the first postmaster was Wiliam Sampson. Josiah James and J. H. Harris laid out the village, built a school house, and built a church. Tremont was governed under district control until March 11, 1835, when it was organized as a town.

=== Courthouse ===
Tremont became the seat of Tazewell County in 1836. John Harris donated 20 acres of land, and the citizens raised $2,000 to bring the county seat to the town. The two-story red brick courthouse was 40 by 60 feet with Grecian columns and an octagonal cupola topped with a weathervane. Construction began in 1837 and completed in 1839. Due to a political rivalry, the county seat transferred back to Pekin in 1849.

Tremont was also host to Abraham Lincoln during his travels as a lawyer before his advancement into higher office. Lincoln visited the Tremont Courthouse in 1842; here, James Shields challenged him to a duel. Lincoln last spoke in Tremont on August 30, 1858. A marker now stands in commemoration of the courthouse.

== Geography ==
According to the 2010 census, Tremont has a total area of 0.94 square miles (2.43 km^{2}), all land.

== Demographics ==
Historical population
Census	Pop.	Note	%±
1850	461		—
1870	437		—
1880	417		−4.6%
1890	508		21.8%
1900	768		51.2%
1910	782		1.8%
1920	976		24.8%
1930	798		−18.2%
1940	935		17.2%
1950	1,138		21.7%
1960	1,558		36.9%
1970	1,942		24.6%
1980	2,096		7.9%
1990	2,088		−0.4%
2000	2,029		−2.8%
2010	2,236		10.2%
2020	2,277		1.8%
U.S. Decennial Census

Tremont is part of the Peoria, Illinois Metropolitan Statistical Area.

=== 2020 census ===
As of the 2020 census, Tremont had a population of 2,277. The median age was 39.7 years. 24.6% of residents were under the age of 18 and 20.8% of residents were 65 years of age or older. For every 100 females there were 89.9 males, and for every 100 females age 18 and over there were 88.3 males age 18 and over.

0.0% of residents lived in urban areas, while 100.0% lived in rural areas.

There were 950 households in Tremont, of which 31.8% had children under the age of 18 living in them. Of all households, 52.9% were married-couple households, 16.0% were households with a male householder and no spouse or partner present, and 27.5% were households with a female householder and no spouse or partner present. About 29.2% of all households were made up of individuals and 16.2% had someone living alone who was 65 years of age or older.

There were 1,007 housing units, of which 5.7% were vacant. The homeowner vacancy rate was 2.0% and the rental vacancy rate was 8.2%.

Racial composition as of the 2020 census
Race	Number	Percent
White	2,111	92.7%
Black or African American	30	1.3%
American Indian and Alaska Native	7	0.3%
Asian	14	0.6%
Native Hawaiian and Other Pacific Islander	2	0.1%
Some other race	16	0.7%
Two or more races	97	4.3%
Hispanic or Latino (of any race)	58	2.5%

=== 2010 census ===
As of the census of 2010, there were 5,500 people, 900 households, and 750 families residing in the village and the surrounding upscale subdivisions and agricultural areas. There are 4 main subdivisions of Tremont: Lake Windemere, Royal Colony, Hickory Hills and Lake Knolls. The population density was 2,128.8 inhabitants per square mile (821.9/km^{2}). There were 835 housing units at an average density of 876.1 per square mile (338.3/km^{2}). The racial makeup of the village was 98.50% White, 0.50% African American, 0.34% Native American, 0.10% Asian, 0.10% from other races, and 0.10% from two or more races. Hispanic or Latino of any race were 0.44% of the population.

There were 816 households, out of which 31.7% had children under the age of 18 living with them, 62.1% were married couples living together, 7.5% had a female householder with no husband present, and 28.2% were non-families. 25.7% of all households were made up of individuals, and 10.2% had someone living alone who was 65 years of age or older. The average household size was 2.49 and the average family size was 2.99.

In the village, the population was spread out, with 25.8% under the age of 18, 7.7% from 18 to 24, 28.0% from 25 to 44, 22.3% from 45 to 64, and 16.2% who were 65 years of age or older. The median age was 37 years. For every 100 females, there were 93.1 males. For every 100 females age 18 and over, there were 89.9 males.

The median income for a household in the village was $85,137, and the median income for a family was $89,800. Males had a median income of $61,118 versus $44,750 for females. The per capita income for the village was $41,888. About 2.0% of families and 2.5% of the population were below the poverty line, including 2.9% of those under age 18 and 2.0% of those age 65 or over.

== Economy ==
The largest employer is R.A. Cullinan. Precision Planting (AGCO) is located several miles south of Tremont.

The headquarters of the Tazewell County Health Department are in Tremont.

== Arts and culture ==
The annual Tremont Turkey Festival attracts 20,000 to 30,000 people, and features entertainment, bed races, an antique tractor pull, pageant, parade, craft and antique vendors, and a carnival.

The Tremont District Library features interlibrary loans, delivery to homebound patrons, and public computers.

== Education ==
The school district is Tremont Community Unit School District 702.

There are three public schools in Tremont: Tremont Grade School, Tremont Middle School, and Tremont High School.

== Notable people ==
- Bonnie Cooper (1935–2018), baseball player
- Myra Kingman (1873–1922), journalist and clubwoman
- Danny Lloyd (born 1972), former child actor, starred in The Shining as Danny Torrance
- Katy Nichole (born 2000), Christian singer
- Bob Trumpy (born 1945), former NFL Tight-end for the Cincinnati Bengals (1968–1977).
