= Myra Falls =

Myra Falls may refer to:

- Myra Falls (Vancouver Island), a waterfall at Buttle Lake in Canada
- Myra Falls (Lower Austria), waterfalls in Muggendorf, Austria
