= James B. Bradwell =

American politician

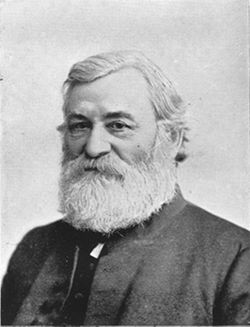
James B. Bradwell

James Bolesworth Bradwell (April 16, 1828 – November 30, 1907) was a prominent Illinois lawyer, judge, and politician.

== Biography ==
James B. Bradwell was born April 16, 1828, in Loughborough, England. He was the son of Thomas and Elizabeth (Gutridge) Bradwell. Sixteen months after his birth, Bradwell's family moved to Utica, New York. In 1833, they moved to Jacksonville, Illinois, and the next year to Wheeling, Illinois. Bradwell subsequently grew up on a farm in Cook County, Illinois. Educated initially in a log schoolhouse, Bradwell later attended Wilson's Academy in Chicago and Knox College in Galesburg, Illinois.

After graduating, Bradwell worked as a journeyman in Chicago in a variety of different trades. He gained a reputation as an outstanding process artist and produced the first halftone ever made in Chicago, which was a portrait of Melville Fuller.

In 1852, he married Myra Colby, with whom he would have four children. An early feminist, Myra Bradwell would, in 1892, become the first woman admitted to the bar in Illinois. Following their marriage, James and Myra Bradwell moved to Memphis, Tennessee where they opened a school.

In 1854, Bradwell was admitted to the bar and the couple moved to Chicago in 1855. In 1861, he was elected County Judge of Cook County, with jurisdiction over all probate matters in Cook County. During the American Civil War, he was an active supporter of the Union and opponent of the copperheads. In addition to passionate addresses, Bradwell wrote and performed songs promoting the Union cause, thus gaining him the nickname of the "sweet singer of Cook County".

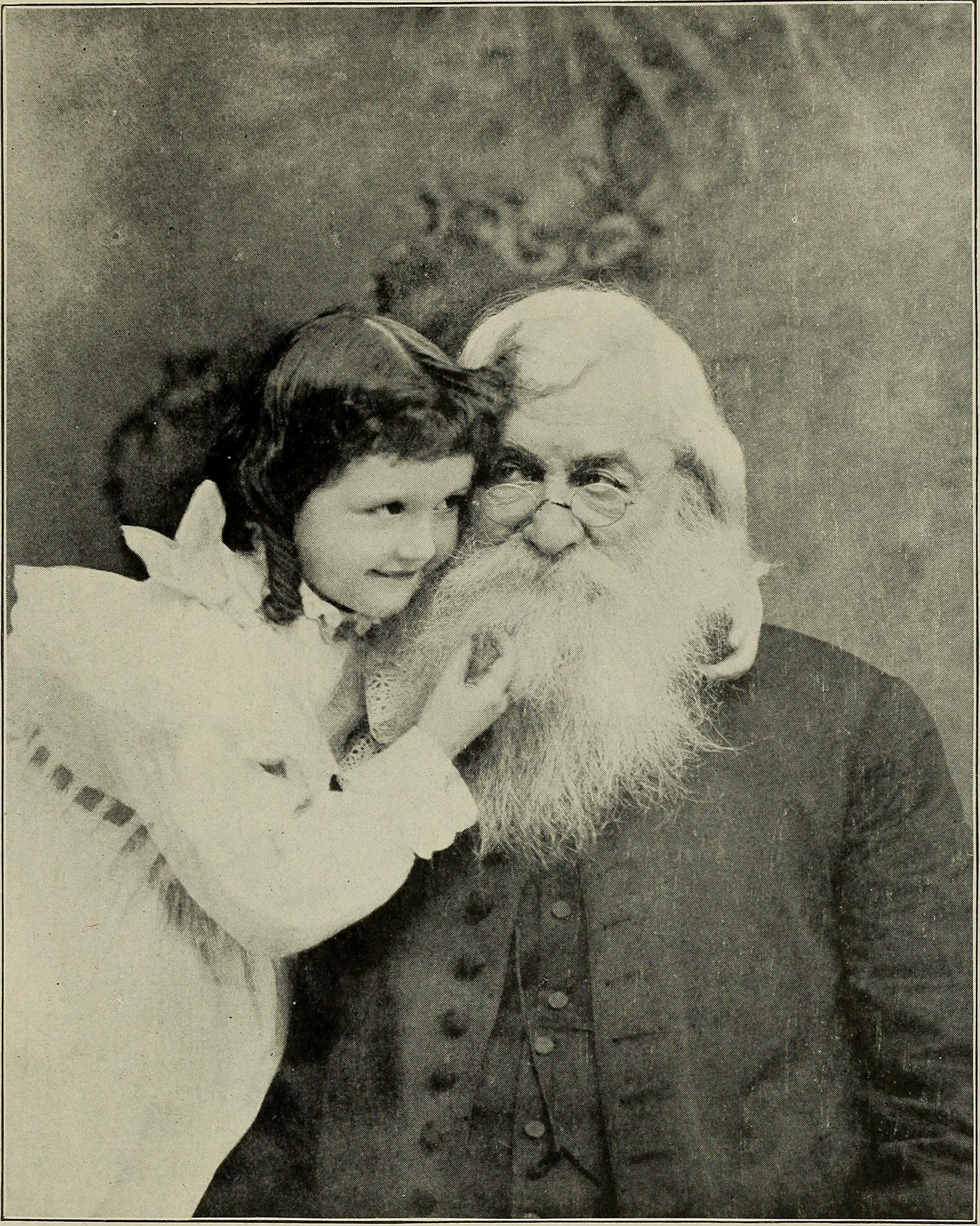
James B. Bradwell with his granddaughter, Myra Bradwell Helmer (later Pritchard), from a 1900 publication

In 1865, he won re-election to a second four-year term. During his time on the bench, Bradwell gained a reputation as one of the country's leading probate jurists. One of his most notable decisions involved Matt C. Jones, a former slave; Bradwell ruled that a marriage made during slavery was valid and survived emancipation and that the children of former slaves were therefore entitled to inherit from their emancipated parents.

He was afterward elected as a member of the Illinois House of Representatives in 1872, and re-elected in 1874. Bradwell had a reputation as an effective legislator. A supporter of the feminist movement of the day, he was the driving force behind legislation that made women eligible to hold all local school offices, and a second act that allowed women to become public notaries.

In 1875, Bradwell represented Mary Todd Lincoln after her son Robert had her involuntarily confined to Bellevue Place, a psychiatric hospital in Batavia, Illinois, and, together with his wife, played a key role in convincing a court to declare Mary Todd Lincoln competent to handle her own finances.

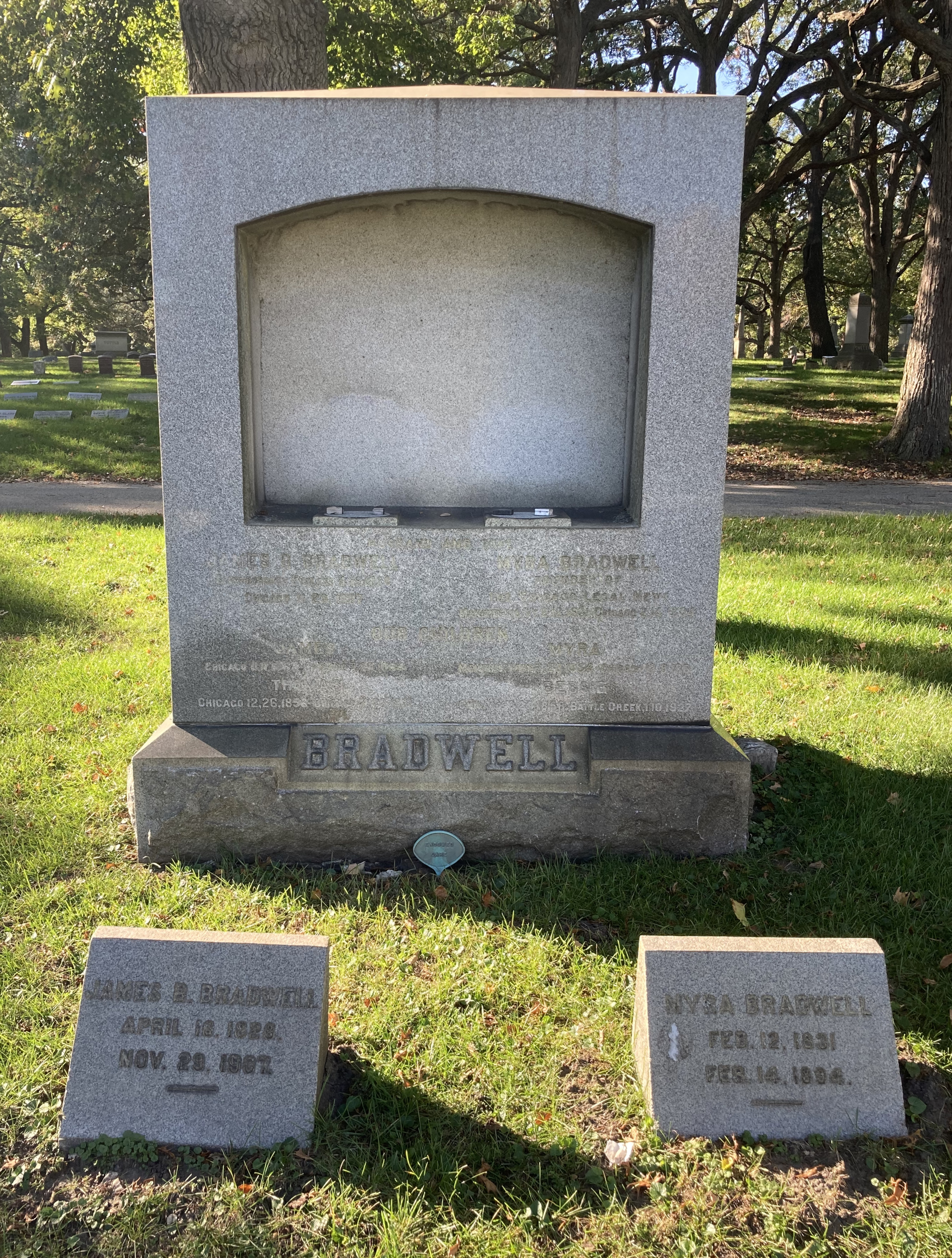
Bradwell's grave at Rosehill Cemetery

Bradwell was active in affairs throughout his career. In 1869, for example, he presided during the organization of the American Woman Suffrage Association in Cleveland. At various points, he served as president of the Chicago Press Club, the Chicago Rifle Club, the Chicago Photographic Society, the Chicago Bar Association, and the Illinois State Bar Association. He served as the Illinois State Bar Association's historian, and would later be made an honorary member of the Illinois State Historical Society. He was one of the founders of the Union League Club of Chicago and served as its first president. At the World's Columbian Exposition of 1893, he served as Chairman of the Photographic Congress Auxiliary. An active Freemason, Bradwell even went so far as to publish a collection of Ancient Masonic Rolls (and to argue that they indicated that women should be eligible for membership in the Freemason organization).

In 1894, Myra Bradwell died, and Judge Bradwell became publisher of the Chicago Legal News, the newspaper that Myra Bradwell had founded in 1868 and published ever since. His daughter, Bessie Bradwell Helmer served as his assistant, and, together, they would go on to edit the revised statutes of Illinois and a number of volumes of Illinois appellate court decisions.

Bradwell died in Chicago on November 30, 1907. He, Myra, and Bessie are buried at Rosehill Cemetery.

His granddaughter Myra Bradwell Helmer Pritchard became a noted golfer.
