= Myra B. Spafard =

American artist (1864–1940)

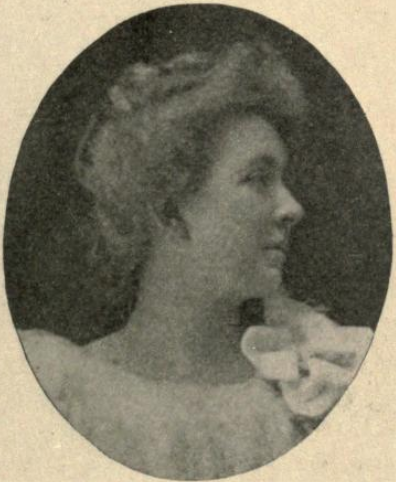
- Myra B. Spafard, from the 1906 yearbook of Teachers College, Columbia University
- Born: Almyra B. Spafard; March 24, 1864; Manchester, Michigan
- Died: March 13, 1940 (age 75); Ann Arbor, Michigan
- Occupation: Artist
- Relatives: Emily Maria Scott (aunt)

Almyra B. "Myra" Spafard (March 24, 1864 – March 13, 1940) was an American artist. Her watercolor paintings of flowers were exhibited in American cities, mainly in the 1890s and 1900s.

== Early life and education ==
Spafard was born in Manchester, Michigan, the daughter of Thomas Franklin (Frank) Spafard and Sarah Maria Carpenter Spafard. She attended Cooper Union in the 1880s, and earned a bachelor's degree in education from Teachers College, Columbia University in 1892, She also studied at the Art Students' League and the Chase Art School. Her aunt, Emily Maria Scott, and Henry B. Snell were among her teachers.

== Career ==
Like her aunt and mentor E. M. Scott, Spafard was known for her botanical paintings. Her work was included in exhibitions at the National Academy of Design in 1888, the Pennsylvania Academy of the Fine Arts in 1896, the American Water-Color Society in 1901 and 1903, the Boston Art Club in 1902 and 1903, the Louisiana Purchase Exposition in St. Louis in 1904, the St. Paul School of Fine Arts in 1905, the Art Institute of Chicago in 1907, and the Philadelphia Water Color Exhibition, also in 1904.

Later in life, she taught art at Southeastern High School in Detroit.

== Personal life and legacy ==
Spafard died in 1940, in Ann Arbor, Michigan, at the age of 75. Her work is in the collection of Middlebury College Museum of Art.
