= Myra MacDonald =

Scottish journalist and author

- Occupations: journalist and author
- Notable work: Heights of Madness: One Woman's Journey in Pursuit of a Secret War, Defeat is an Orphan: How Pakistan Lost the Great South Asian War

Myra MacDonald is a Scottish journalist and author. She is an expert on South Asian politics and security, and has written three books on India and Pakistan.

Born and educated in Scotland, she joined Reuters as a graduate trainee in 1984, and during a career spanning virtually three decades as its foreign correspondent, she worked in Middle East, Europe, and South Asia. Throughout her career, she held various positions at Reuters, including stints as chief correspondent in France and bureau chief in India.

== Early life ==
MacDonald was born, and educated in Scotland; first at Hutchesons' Grammar School and then at University of St Andrews.

== Career ==
After graduating from St Andrews University with a degree in Psychology, MacDonald joined Reuters as a graduate trainee in 1984, spending a year in Paris.

Her early work years included a stint in Luxembourg, followed by a posting to Cairo. In the 1990s, she was back in Paris as Reuters chief correspondent.

In March 2000, she was assigned overseas as Reuters bureau chief in New Delhi. She served in this position until 2003, when she took a leave of absence to research the Siachen conflict. In her own words, she described her stint in India as:

When I left for India in 2000 I had little inkling that South Asia would become the region to which I would want to devote the rest of my career. Somehow having a car crash on the way into Delhi from the airport – and then piling out onto the side of the road with my nine-year-old daughter and French au pair while watching the cows go by – failed to put me off. We had a small earthquake the next day and a near-war a year later, so some might call me contrarian. I would prefer to say that in the years covering both India and Pakistan I have rarely met more generous people – in both countries.

Her research took her to both the Indian and Pakistani sides of the war zone in Siachen, and ultimately culminated in the publication of the book Heights of Madness: One Woman's Journey in Pursuit of a Secret War in 2007, the work which earned her acclaim.

In addition to her own research, she has also given presentation on Siachen to the Royal Military Academy Sandhurst and to the International Institute for Strategic Studies in London.

After the publication of her book, she turned her focused on writing about Pakistan. By November 2013, when she left Reuters, she had been working as its foreign correspondent for almost 30 years.

=== Defeat is an Orphan ===
After leaving Reuters, MacDonald began work on a new book, Defeat is an Orphan: How Pakistan Lost the Great South Asian War, which was published in 2017. In the book, MacDonald focuses on the India–Pakistan relations over the past almost two decades since the two countries conducted nuclear weapons tests in 1998 and declared themselves as nuclear powers. It is in this framework, she says that it is precisely this declaration that emboldened the Pakistani establishment into believing that it could continue with its "reckless reliance" on its "militant proxies" to target India and destabilize Afghanistan. In the book, she explores the past many incidents of terrorism targeting India, starting from the hijacking of Indian Airlines Flight 814, which was on its way to Delhi from Kathmandu, in December 1999 to the December 2001 terrorist attack on the Indian parliament, 2008 Mumbai attacks, and terrorist attacks on the Pathankot Air Force base and the Indian army base in Uri in January 2016 and September, that same year, respectively, that were all executed at the behest of Pakistan by its proxies.

MacDonald details how Pakistan's obsessive preoccupation with India, which has manifested itself in the form of a proxy war, has undermined democracy in its own country and its economy, led to loss of opportunities for peace, and how it itself lost control over the militant groups that it had been fostering. And how India, on the other hand, used this time to make significant and rapid economic gains. MacDonald has also criticized U.S. policy in the region, which she says has been only somewhat sympathetic to India, but not to the degree to which she would like.

Writing in The Hindu Book Review, Suhasini Haidar found MacDonald's narration on the whole as "even-handed", but noted several lapses, which according to her are common to such India-Pakistan treatises of western and Indian scholars alike. First, she writes, is the inclination to look at the hostile relations between the two countries through a "time prism," taking the nuclear tests conducted by them in 1998 as a starting reference point for Pakistan's initiation of a reckless proxy war against India, using Islamic militants. As Haider puts it, "The truth is Pakistan's ‘reckless reliance’ on proxies did not begin in 1998, but all the way back in 1948, during the first Kashmir war. Later, the use of Sikh militants who hijacked planes to Lahore in the 1980s, or the D-Company that has lived in Karachi after the Mumbai blasts in 1993 were all part of a similar strategy."

Second, Haider notes, is the mistaken belief that the international players, particularly the US, out of naivety pursue a South Asia policy that makes it possible for Pakistan to continue its sponsorship of terrorism against India. Haider says, "The U.S. is neither naïve nor foolish. If it has pursued a certain course for decades, then that must be seen for what it is: a policy."

Andrew J. Nathan reviewed the book in Foreign Affairs, noting that the book "is a slashing indictment of Pakistani strategy by a journalist who has covered South Asia for decades."

== Books ==
MacDonald has written three books on India and Pakistan:

- MacDonald, Myra (2007). Heights of Madness: One Woman's Journey in Pursuit of a Secret War. Rupa & Company. ISBN 9788129112866.
- MacDonald, Myra (2017). Defeat is an Orphan: How Pakistan Lost the Great South Asian War. Oxford University Press. ISBN 9781849046411.
- MacDonald, Myra (2021). White As the Shroud: India, Pakistan and War on the Frontiers of Kashmir. Hurst Publishers. ISBN 9781787383982.
