= Bessie Bradwell Helmer =

American lawyer, editor and publisher (1858 – 1927)

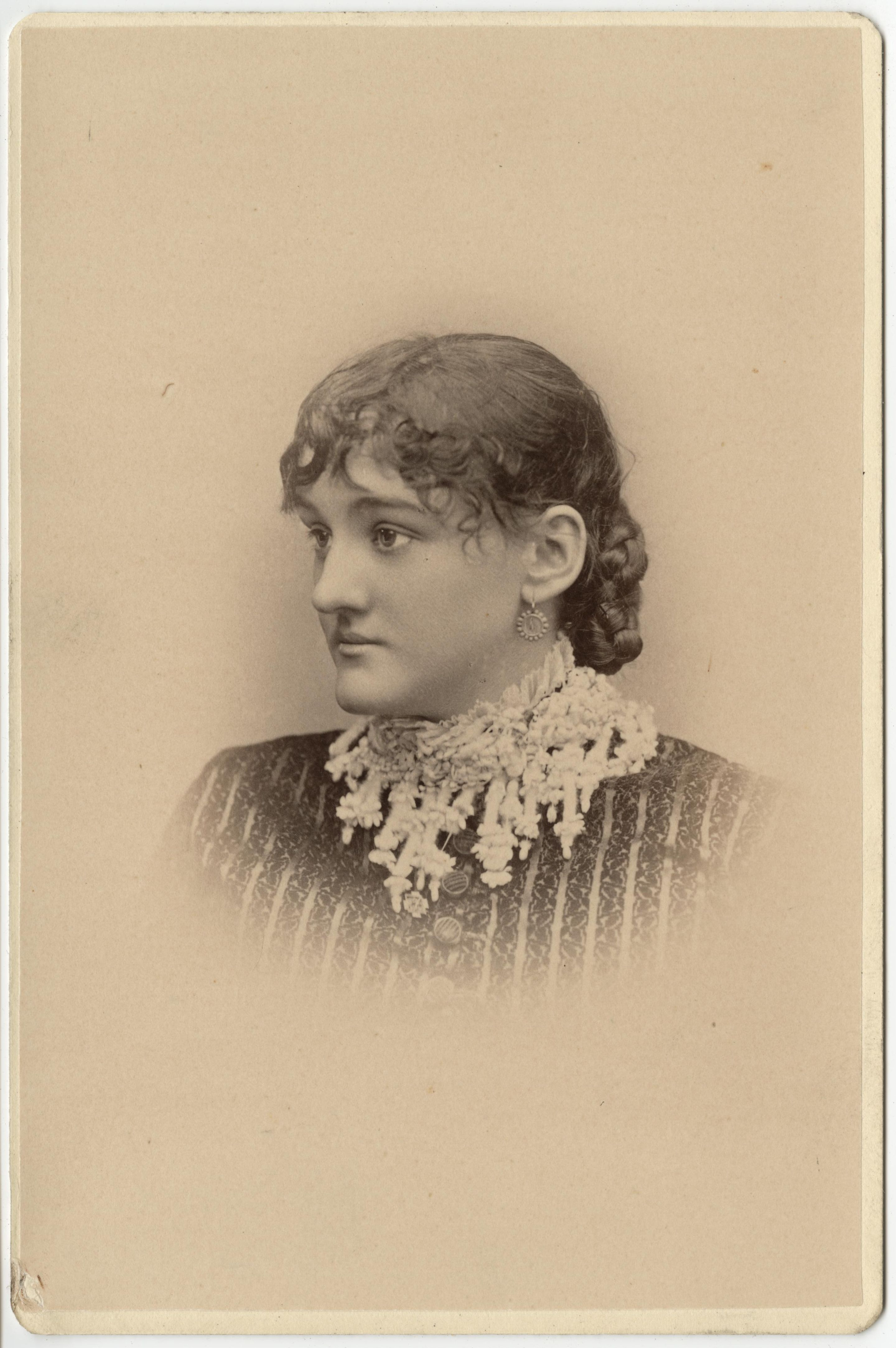
- Bessie Bradwell Helmer, 1880
- Born: October 20, 1858; Chicago, Illinois, U.S.
- Died: January 10, 1927 (aged 68); Battle Creek, Michigan, U.S.
- Education: Union College of Law
- Occupations: Lawyer, editor, publisher
- Spouse: Frank Ambrose Helmer
- Parent(s): James B. Bradwell; Myra Colby Bradwell

Bessie Bradwell Helmer (October 20, 1858 – January 10, 1927) was an American lawyer, editor and publisher. She edited the Revised Statutes of the State of Illinois. She was associated with the Illinois State Bar Association and the American Bar Association.

== Early life and education ==
Born on October 20, 1858, in Chicago, Illinois, Bessie Bradwell Helmer was the daughter of the Judge James B. Bradwell and his wife Myra Colby Bradwell, a well-known lawyer and an active proponent of woman suffrage. Her father, James B. Bradwell, also an advocate of women’s advancement, was “the first judge to hold that a marriage made during slavery was valid after emancipation.” Her mother, Myra Colby Bradwell, was the first woman in the United States to formally apply for admission to the Illinois bar in 1869, which was refused “on the basis of her sex.” However, in 1890, acting on its own motion, the Supreme Court of Illinois approved her original application. In a significant move, in 1892, she was allowed to practice before the US Supreme Court as well.

Helmer graduated from the Chicago High School as valedictorian in 1876. She continued her higher education from the Union College of Law, Chicago (later Northwestern University Law School), and received an A.B. in 1880 and an A.M. in 1882. She was also chosen as valedictorian of her class in the Union College of Law, Chicago. As encouraged by her mother, Helmer received her LL.B. and was later admitted to the Illinois bar.

== The Great Chicago Fire ==
At the age of 13, Helmer survived the Great Chicago Fire of October 8th, 1871. She and her father, upon realizing the city was “doomed”, traveled to his law office to rescue law books and a subscription book to her mother’s Chicago Legal News. She and her family were separated in the crowd but were eventually reunited a day later at a town meeting.

== Marriage and Legal Practice ==
On December 23, 1885, she married Frank Ambrose Helmer, also a lawyer, and joined him in his legal practice. In 1894, following her mother’s death, she became assistant editor of the Chicago Legal News, the first legal journal in the West, founded by her mother, Myra Colby Bradwell, in 1868, who served as both publisher and editor.

After her father’s death, in 1907, she became the editor-in-chief of the Chicago Legal News and the president of the company that owned the journal. Helmer was part of the Association of Collegiate Alumnae, now known as the American Association of University Women, and briefly served as its president of the Chicago branch.

She also edited at least ten volumes of Reports of Cases Determined in the Appellate Court of Illinois.

In 1926, she submitted her writings on the Great Chicago Fire to the Chicago Historical Society (now the Chicago History Museum). She died on January 10, 1927, in Battle Creek, Michigan.
