= Myra Maimoh =

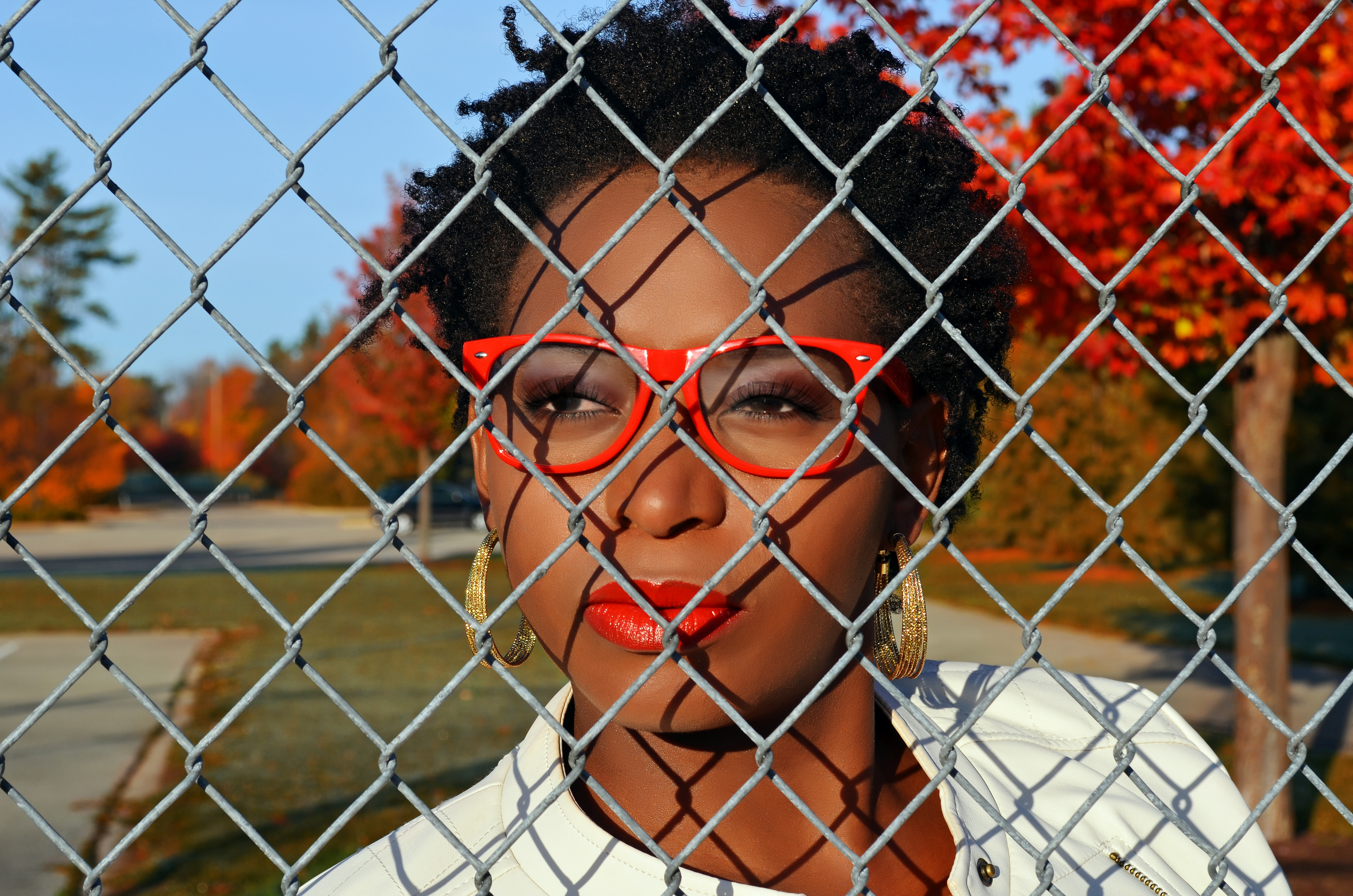

Background information
- Born: December 6, 1986 (age 38); Bamenda, Cameroon
- Genres: Soul/Afro soul
- Occupation: Singer
- Website: myramaimoh.com

Myra Maimoh (born December 6, 1982, in Cameroon) is an afro-soul singer from Cameroon. Her debut album with Hitsmith Records in Germany, Answer'd Me, was released to rave reviews for its musical breadth and originality. Her sophomore indie album, Uniq, was released in 2015, headlined by her sultry album single "a no go tire".

== Biography ==
Camroonian-born artist Myra Maimoh grew up in a large Christian family in Bamenda. Her mother was her greatest musical influence by shopping for records and introducing her to all flavours of song and sound. Influenced by her mother's records of Skeeter Davies, James Brown, Ella Fitzgerald, Louis Armstrong, African music of the likes of Richard Bona, Bebe Manga, Kadja Nin and a large spectrum of country, traditional African, jazz and pop music, Maimoh started singing, composing and entertaining while still in preschool at the age of 3.

Maimoh wrote her first set of songs and stories at the age of 13, examples being "It's not too late", "Life is short", "Aberni ma Papa" and "Our Lord is always there". "It's not too late" later became a hit song interpreted by the Cherubic Queens, a very successful Cameroonian girl band in which she sang. She joined the Cherubic Queens at age 15, and wrote and performed with them for three years.

Maimoh has had an extremely intensive and extensive musical career ranging from singing and dancing with group - Crystalz, which won many inter-college awards for best performances.

She won numerous awards in the Coca-Cola Competition for the Arts between 1998 and 2001, including group and solo awards in poetry, composition and dance. From 2001 to 2005, she sang background vocals in some of the largest music recording studios in Cameroon, and featured on many chart-topping songs by various artists.

She moved to the US in 2012 after launching her career and recording her first album in Germany. She is also an accomplished businesswoman, with an MBA and MSc in International Business.

== Discography ==
- Answer'd me (2010)
1. "You and Me"
2. "Hallow"
3. "Killing Me"
4. "Cuando"
5. "I'Ncourage You"
6. "Whatever I Promise"
7. "I Need Him"
8. "Please Take It Slow"
9. "The Lies"
10. "Turtle Back Rock"
11. "Answer Me"
