= Myra Greene =

American photographer (born 1975)

- Born: 1975 (age 50–51); New York City
- Education: Master of Fine Arts from the University of New Mexico (2002), Bachelor of Fine Arts from Washington University in St. Louis (1997)
- Occupations: Associate professor of photography; artist; photographer
- Employer: Columbia College Chicago
- Known for: Photography
- Website: www.myragreene.com

Myra Greene is an American artist who has worked on a number of projects, mostly photographic. Among them are Hairy Projects, The Beautiful Ones, Character Recognition, Self Portraits, My White Friends, and Sketches for Something.

Through her work, Greene prompts thought-provoking questions about how individuals are often judged based on skin color and other physical characteristics rather than on their character. Greene's introspective and race-conscious collections have been exhibited in galleries and exhibitions across the country and have gained national recognition in the media, including a New York Times spotlight piece for her collection "My White Friends" in 2012.

== Early life ==
Born in 1975 in New York City and growing up in Harlem, Myra Green received her B.F.A. from the Sam Fox School of Design & Visual Arts at Washington University in St. Louis (1997) and her M.F.A. in photography from the University of New Mexico (2002).

== Career ==
She was an associate professor of photography at Columbia College Chicago, and her photography collections have been featured regularly in national exhibitions, galleries, and museums since 2009. Throughout her career, Greene has confronted matters of race and personal identity through her work. Growing up in the predominantly black neighborhood of Harlem, New York, yet attending mostly white schools on the Upper East Side of Manhattan, Greene has always been conscious of race and how it has influenced her personal narrative.

Since 2016 Greene has been a professor at Spelman College in Atlanta, Georgia and is currently the chair of Art & Visual Culture and Photography Program Director.

In a New York Times interview, Greene states, "I'm always thinking about race. I recognize it when I'm the only black person in a room. My white friends will notice I'm the only black person, too. But they don't notice a room full of white people." In her first collection to receive national attention, "Character Recognition", Greene's use of high contrast black glass ambrotypes prompts viewers to consider the unidimensional way black individuals are viewed in society.

In a response to her feelings about how society first and foremost categorized her by her skin-color rather than judging her by who she is as a person, Greene's close-up and tightly framed images of portions of her own face prompt an uncomfortable answer to the questions the collection's title implies about whether she, and black people in general, are judged by their skin color rather than by their character.

By using black glass ambrotype, Greene inclines viewers to associate and compare the images in her collection with historical images of African-American slaves taken in the 19th century that were intended to be used as species identifications in science textbooks. This linkage to historical African-American slave roots makes these images powerful reminders of the commodification and stereotyping Greene spotlights through the materials and medium she used to create this collection.

=== My White Friends ===
The premise for her most well-known collection of photographs "My White Friends" originated after a discussion she had with one of her white friends about her images in "Character Recognition". Greene commented in an Art Beat interview that her friend said "they're really beautiful, but I just don't feel comfortable thinking about blackness." In the conversation that followed, this friend admitted that he didn't think about his own whiteness when he looked at photos, which started Greene on a path to examine what it would look like to photograph her friends for their whiteness.

Traveling around the country and asking her friends if she can "photograph them for their whiteness", Greene uses her friends' styles, gestures, and natural environments to create an image of them that captures their whiteness. While these images are constructed and are not meant to be portraits, her work prompts questions about what can and cannot be captured in a photo, what truths, if any, can be discovered through looking at photographs, and what assumptions viewers make every time they look at an image of a person.

This collection gained national recognition and had a successful Kickstarter campaign that resulted in a book of the photographs in the collection "My White Friends".

== Recognition ==
- 1999: Curatorial Fellowship, Museum of Modern Art, New York City
- 2001: Academic Scholarship, Anderson Ranch Arts Center, Snowmass, Colorado
- 2002:
  - Journal of Contemporary Photography Award, The Print Center, Philadelphia, Pennsylvania
  - Academic Fellowship, The Photography Institute, New York City
- 2003: Artist Residency, The Center of Photography, Woodstock, New York
- 2004: Artist Residency, Light Work, Syracuse, New York
- 2007: Honorable Mention, New Work #11, En Foco
- 2009: Illinois Arts Council Photography Fellowship
- 2012: Community Arts Assistance Program (CAAP) Grant, City of Chicago.
- 2013: Prairie Center of Arts Residency, Peoria, Illinois
- 2014: Artist Residency Bolt, Chicago Artist Coalition, Chicago, Illinois

== Solo shows ==
- John Sommers Gallery
- The American Gallery

== Group exhibitions ==
Myra Greene's artwork has been shown in group exhibitions in the following museums and galleries: Wadsworth Athenaeum Museum of Art; Synapse Gallery and Center for Photography; Rochester Contemporary; Center for Photography at Woodstock; SRO Gallery, Texas Tech University; Northlight Gallery; Visual Studies Workshop in Rochester; Warren Robbins Gallery; Anderson Gallery; Grossman Gallery; School of the Museum of Fine Arts at Tufts, Boston, Massachusetts; East and West Galleries, Texas Woman's University; The Print Center, Philadelphia, Pennsylvania; The University of New Mexico Art Museum, Albuquerque, New Mexico; AC2 Gallery; The Red Eye Gallery; Joseph Gross Gallery; Community College Visual Arts Gallery, Harwood Art Center; and John Sommers Gallery.
