= Myra Kingman =

American journalist (1873–1922)

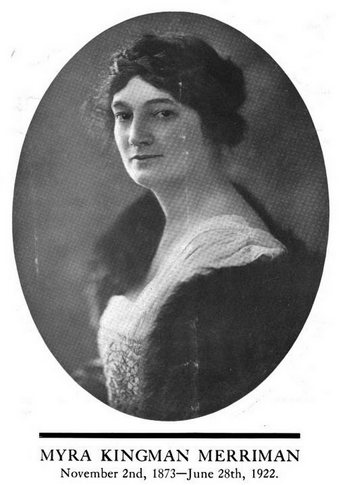
Myra Kingman Merriman, on the cover of a 1922 publication.

Myra Hunt Kingman (November 2, 1873 – June 28, 1922), for much of her adult life known as Myra Kingman Miller or Myra Kingman Merriman, was an American journalist and clubwoman, President of the National Federation of College Women from 1915 to 1922.

== Early life ==
Myra Hunt Kingman was born in Tremont, Illinois, the daughter of Lysander Philip Kingman and Susan Wilde Pettes Hunt Kingman.

== Career ==
As a journalist in the midwest, Myra Kingman was Sunday editor of the Peoria Daily Transcript, on staff as a special correspondent at the Chicago Chronicle, and secretary of the Northwest Editorial Association. After moving to California in 1894, she wrote for the Long Beach Mirror. In 1908, she established the first movie theatre for children, in Long Beach, California.

As a clubwoman, Myra Kingman Merriman was president of the National Federation of College Women from 1915 to 1922, and chaired the Better Films Committee of the National Council of Women from 1918 to 1922. The Better Films Committee endorsed films the considered wholesome and fit for family viewing, and promoted the exhibition of such films. During World War I she was appointed by Woodrow Wilson to an advisory board in the United States Department of Labor. After the war she organized a Foreign Film Unit of American women, showing instructional films about hygiene, public health, cooking, farming, and other topics in France, Russia, Italy and elsewhere, to support reconstruction in war-affected places. They also provided a program of children's films for orphanages.

She testified at a Congressional hearing on women's citizenship and marriage to foreigners, in 1917, saying "I think the law should be just and should be equal to both men and women in every country." In 1920 she led the American delegation at the International Council of Women meeting in Christiania, Norway, while she was on her honeymoon.

== Personal life ==
Myra Kingman married twice, first to George Alonzo Miller in 1895; they had a daughter, Susan, born in 1896, and George Miller died in 1916. She married her second husband, Dr. Josiah Charles Merriman, a chemistry professor, in 1920. She died two years later, aged 48 years.
