= Myra Bradwell =

American publisher and political activist (1831–1894)

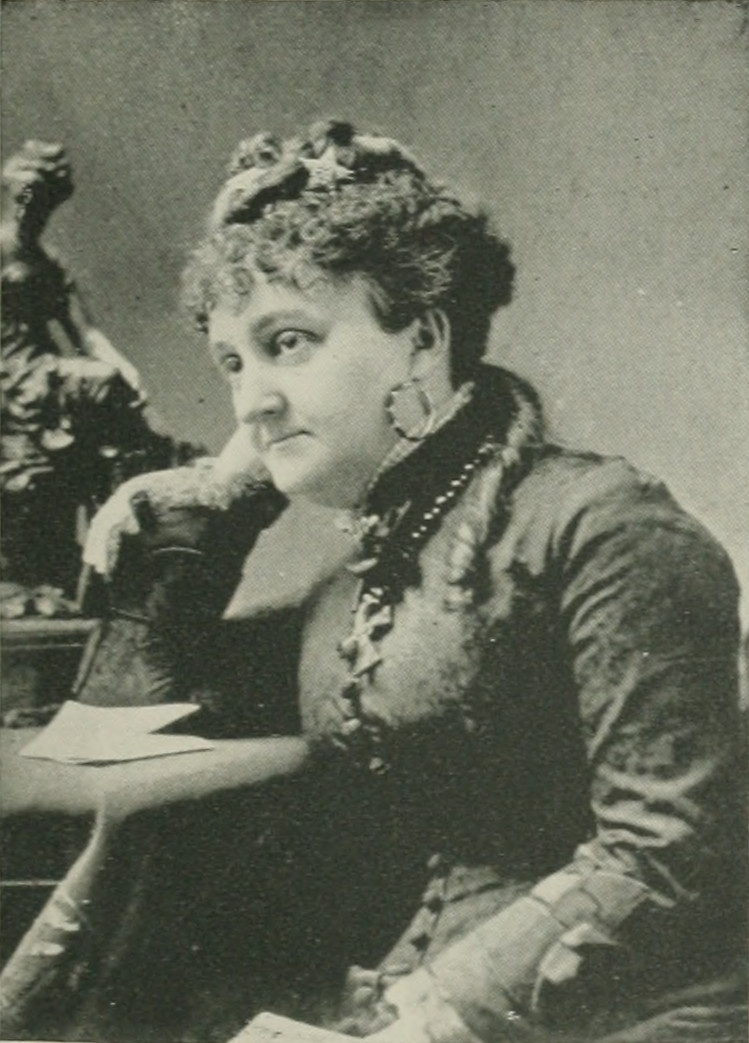
- Born: Myra Colby; February 12, 1831; Manchester, Vermont, U.S.
- Died: February 14, 1894 (aged 63); Chicago, Illinois, U.S.
- Burial place: Rosehill Cemetery
- Education: Elgin Female Seminary

Myra Colby Bradwell (February 12, 1831 – February 14, 1894) was an American publisher and political activist. She attempted in 1869 to become the first woman to be admitted to the Illinois bar to practice law, but was denied admission by the Illinois Supreme Court in 1870 and the United States Supreme Court in 1873, in rulings upholding a separate women's sphere. Bradwell had founded and published Chicago Legal News from 1868, reporting on the law and continued that work. Meanwhile, influenced by her case, in 1872 the Illinois legislature passed a state law prohibiting gender discrimination in admission to any occupation or profession (with the exception of the military).

In 1890, the Illinois Supreme Court on its own motion granted Bradwell admission to the Illinois bar, and the United States Supreme Court followed suit two years later. In 1994, Myra Bradwell was inducted into the National Women's Hall of Fame.

== Early and family life ==
Myra Colby was born on February 12, 1831, in Manchester, Vermont, to Eben Colby and Abigail Willey. She lived with her family in Vermont and Western New York during her childhood. When she was twelve, the family moved to Schaumburg, Illinois. She attended schools in Kenosha, Wisconsin, and later enrolled in Elgin Female Seminary in Illinois.

In 1852, Myra Colby married James B. Bradwell. Two years later they moved to Memphis, Tennessee. James Bradwell was the head of a private school, where Myra Bradwell also became a teacher. She completed her formal education by age 24 and taught herself the practice of law. She became a school teacher after she graduated.

In 1855, they moved to Chicago, where James Bradwell was admitted to the Chicago Bar. He became a successful lawyer and judge. In 1873, he was elected to the General Assembly. The couple had four children: James, Myra, Thomas, and Bessi Bradwell. James and Myra died at an early age.

== Career ==
A few years after marrying James Bradwell, Myra Bradwell started her formal law training when her husband was admitted to the Illinois Bar. She was an apprentice in her husband's office and assisted him with legal research and writing. Complications arose because of coverture laws, which prohibited married women from holding property. The ability to hold property was necessary to become even a notary public.

Myra Bradwell raised funds to help aid the wounded soldiers during the American Civil War. She was also a member of the Northwestern Sanitary Commission.

In 1868, Bradwell founded the Chicago Legal News. With her husband's legal help, she persuaded the Illinois legislature to pass a law so that she could serve as both editor and business manager of the Chicago Legal News Company (it had other publications, and produced stationery and legal forms). Although the paper's offices were destroyed in the Great Chicago Fire of 1871, it continued to publish. The widely circulated paper published information about court opinions, laws, and court ordinances, and also had a muckraking function. Its reporters criticized corruption within the local bar and judiciary and urged railroad regulation. Bradwell also was determined to improve women's status in society, so the paper included a column entitled "Law Relating to Women".

To support women's suffrage and efforts to gain employment, Myra Bradwell helped write the Illinois Married Women's Property Act of 1861. With Alta M. Hulett, she wrote the Earnings Act of 1869; both bills allowed married women to control their earnings and property. In August 1869, a federal judge from the Seventh Circuit Court of Appeals and state's attorney examined Bradwell's legal ability, pronounced her qualified, and suggested that the Illinois State Supreme Court Issue her a law license. But, her application was denied on the grounds that as a married woman, she could not enter into any legal contracts, as lawyers do in their profession. On February 5, 1870, the Illinois high court denied the appeal of her claim for a law license on the basis of sex. Chief Justice Charles B. Lawrence stated that "God designed the sexes to occupy different spheres of action".

Bradwell appealed further to the United States Supreme Court, arguing that refusing to admit her to the bar because she was female violated her constitutional rights under the Fourteenth Amendment ("No State shall make or enforce any law which shall abridge the privileges or immunities of citizens of the United States; nor shall any State deprive any person of life, liberty, or property, without due process of law; nor deny to any person within its jurisdiction the equal protection of the laws..."). Despite the efforts of Senator Matthew Hale Carpenter, who argued on her behalf, the Court held 8 to 1 that the Privileges and Immunities Clause of the Fourteenth Amendment did not include the right to practice a profession. Justice Joseph P. Bradley wrote, "The natural and proper timidity and delicacy which belongs to the female sex evidently unfits it for many of the occupations of civil life... [T]he paramount destiny and mission of woman are to fulfill the noble and benign offices of wife and mother. This is the law of the Creator". Bradwell v. Illinois, 83 U.S. (16 Wall.) 130 (1873).

The court's holding was fourfold:

1. Women would not be allowed to practice the law.
2. A different result would open the flood gates and many more women would want to follow in Bradwell's footsteps.
3. Brutal cases would not be appropriate for a woman to handle.
4. The state was worried about the effect women would have on the administration office.

Thus in 1873, the Supreme Court also denied her admission to the legal profession because of her sex. The same year, the governor of Illinois denied her an appointment as notary public.

Meanwhile, in 1872, influenced by her case, the Illinois legislature passed a new law stating, "No person shall be precluded or debarred from any occupation, profession, or employment (except the military) on account of sex" and in 1875, another law was passed to allow women to become notaries. Bradwell continued her work on the Chicago Legal News where she was the journal's publisher, business manager, and editor-in-chief. She also became an active member in the women's suffrage movement, serving as Secretary of the Illinois Women Suffrage Association.

Despite changing the law, Bradwell made no further proceedings to gain her license, although she assisted women in other states attempting to study law, effect legal change, and procure law licenses in their respective states. She insisted that women's equality was a non-partisan issue. Bradwell was sought out for career advice by a young Mary Bartelme, who was later the first woman elected judge in Illinois. In Washington, D.C. Belva Lockwood lobbied Congress to pass an anti-discrimination bill to allow women to practice in federal courts. It was finally passed in 1879 and signed into law by President Rutherford B. Hayes.

In 1879, Lockwood became the first woman admitted to the U.S. Supreme Court bar and in 1880 the first woman to argue a case before that body. She was later denied admission to the Virginia bar and in 1893 the United States Supreme court refused to force Virginia to admit her, citing its decision in Bradwell's case. Meanwhile, in 1890, the Illinois Supreme Court acting on its own motion honored Bradwell by approving her original application to the bar. On March 28, 1892, Bradwell then received her license to practice before the United States Supreme Court. The Illinois Supreme Court and the U.S. Supreme Court admitted Bradwell, nunc pro tunc, so that the year of her admittance was officially, albeit symbolically, 1869.

== Death and legacy ==
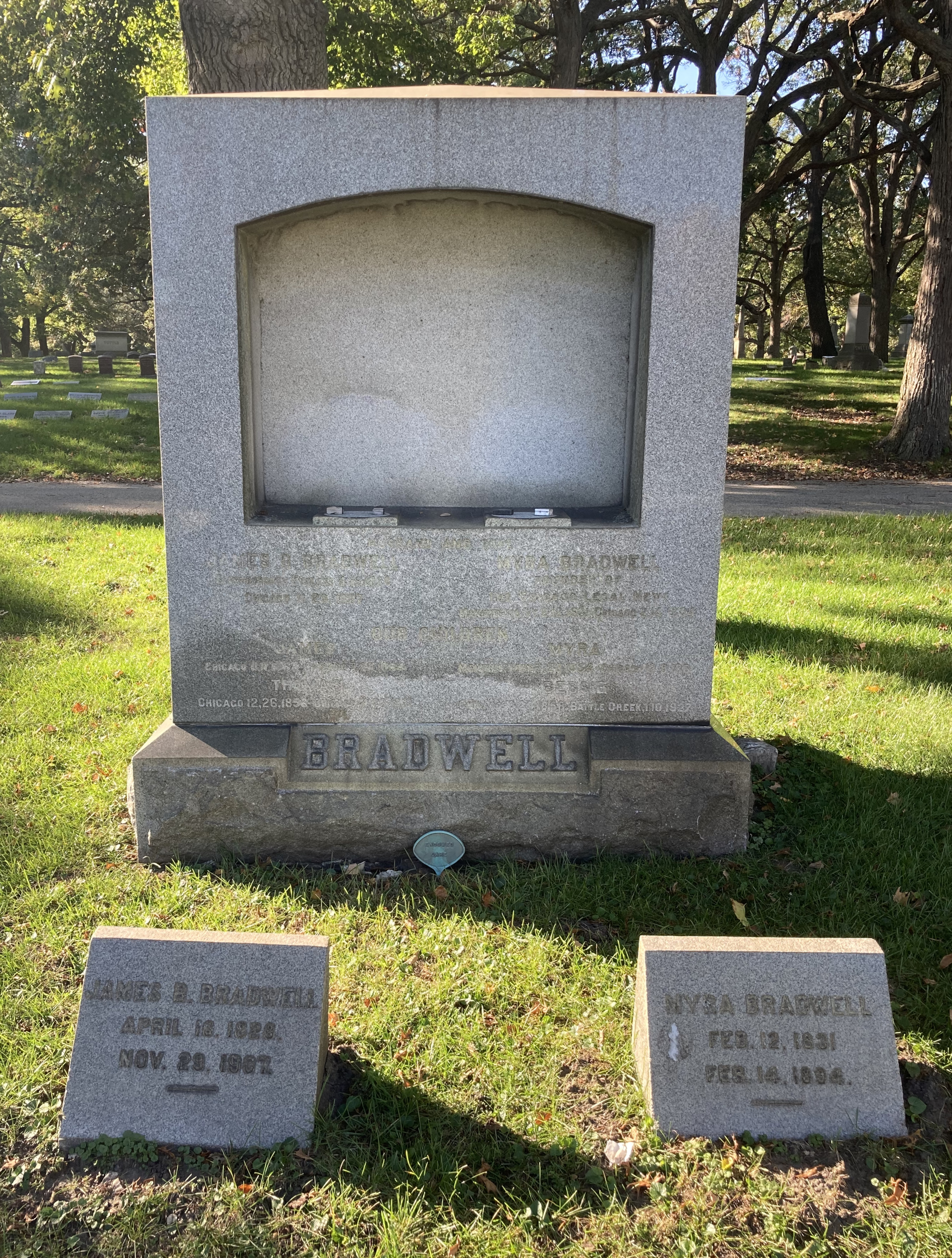
Bradwell's grave at Rosehill Cemetery

Myra Bradwell died of cancer on February 14, 1894, just four years after she was admitted to the bar. She is buried in Chicago's Rosehill Cemetery.

Her daughter, Bessie Bradwell Helmer, continued in her mother's footsteps, graduating from the Union College of Law in 1882. She published the Chicago Legal News until 1925. Her son Thomas Bradwell also became a lawyer and managed the printing company.

Her granddaughter and namesake, Myra Bradwell Helmer Pritchard, became a golfer.

Bradwell School of Excellence in Chicago, Illinois was opened and named in her honor in 1889.

== See also ==
- List of first women lawyers and judges in Illinois
