= Illinois Association Opposed to the Extension of Suffrage to Women =

American anti-suffrage organization

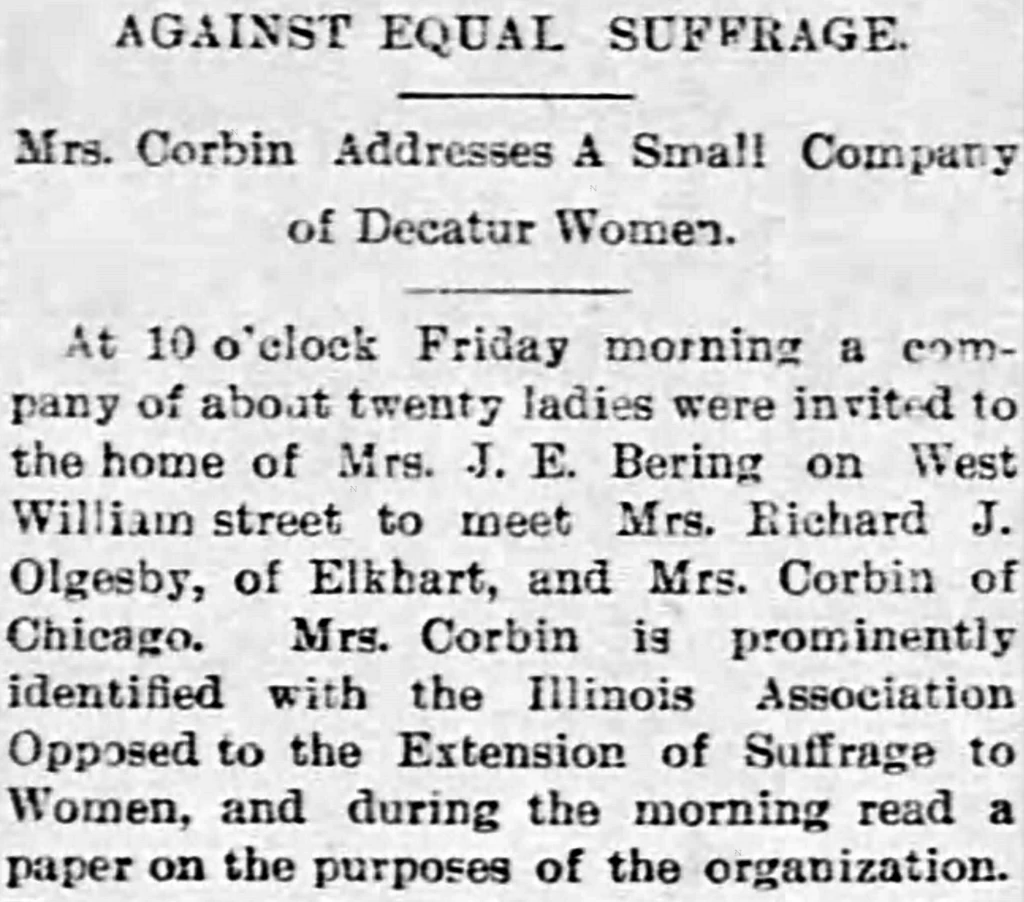
- Association meeting in Decatur, Illinois, April 1, 1898
- Formation: 1897
- Founder: Caroline Fairfield Corbin
- Type: Non-governmental organization
- Purpose: Political advocacy against women's suffrage
- Headquarters: 1523 Dearborn Avenue, Chicago, Illinois
- Members: 15,000 (1908)
- Official language: English
- President: Caroline Fairfield Corbin
- 1st Vice-President: Matilda Nickerson
- 2nd Vice-President: Emma Gillett Oglesby
- Secretary: Jessie Fairfield

The Illinois Association Opposed to the Extension of Suffrage to Women (IAOESW) was an influential organization in the state of Illinois that actively campaigned against the extension of voting rights to women. Founded in 1897 by Caroline Fairfield Corbin, the association played a significant role in the anti-suffrage movement in the United States.

== History ==
The Illinois Women Remonstrants, a loosely organized group led by Caroline Fairfield Corbin, was established in 1886. Despite Illinois passing school suffrage for women in 1891, the scope of this measure was limited due to contested interpretations and repeated challenges in the Illinois Supreme Court.

Between 1893 and 1897, several township suffrage bills were introduced but were defeated three times. This period of legislative activity and the perceived security of the legislature may have contributed to the mobilization of anti-suffrage groups.

In 1897, in response to increasing suffrage activism, including a series of meetings held by the National American Woman Suffrage Association (NAWSA) throughout Illinois that year, the Illinois Women Remonstrants restructured into the Illinois Association Opposed to the Extension of Suffrage to Women (IAOESW).

The IAOESW was modeled after similar anti-suffrage organizations in Massachusetts and New York. It was part of a broader national anti-suffrage movement that included state-level organizations cooperating with each other and with male anti-suffragists who provided legal and political advice.

During this period, Caroline Corbin emerged as the primary author of literature from the antisuffrage organization, representing the group's views individually rather than as a collective entity. Reflecting on the women's suffrage movement, she describes the emergence of antisuffragists as follows:

A new force was preparing to enter the field. For forty years, the quiet, home-loving women of America had been observing the developments in the woman suffrage movement, forming deeply held convictions about it. They perceived the push for woman suffrage as an attempt to add to their already significant domestic responsibilities the duties that men had traditionally shouldered, based on a belief in a divinely ordained division of labor between the sexes. Though these women were not inclined towards public action or conventions, their moral convictions compelled them to make significant sacrifices in opposition to what they viewed as a threat.

Like their suffrage counterparts, antisuffragists were also drawn from elite circles.

In 1908, they went on to say that "during these ten years the suffragists have not gained a single important victory, while legislative records show against them more than one hundred and fifty defeats, covering the ground of municipal, State and presidential or national suffrage.

=== Association's downfall ===
On April 14, 1909, the Illinois Senate committee, chaired by Senator Breidt, favorably reported a crucial bill for statewide women's suffrage, introduced by Senator Billings and endorsed by several senators. Despite opposition from anti-suffrage advocates like Mrs. Caroline F. Corbin, Miss Mary Pomeroy Green, and Miss Jessie Fairfield, who argued against expanding suffrage, the bill advanced for full Senate consideration. The events marked a notable step forward for the suffrage movement, despite the legislative chaos and opposition encountered.

Grace Wilbur Trout moved to Chicago in 1893. By 1900, she had immersed herself in numerous clubs, encouraging their members to join the suffrage movement. By 1910, she had emerged as one of the state's leading suffrage advocates. Elected president of the Chicago Political Equality League (CPEL), Trout quickly revitalized the previously stagnant movement. She pushed clubwomen into the suffrage movement and became one of the state's foremost suffrage leaders by 1910. Trout was elected president of the CPEL and quickly revitalized the somewhat stagnant movement.

Trout became president of the Illinois Equal Suffrage Association in 1912 and led them until 1920 when the group disbanded, except for the year 1915–1916. Trout embraced attention-grabbing stunts that would bring suffrage news to the press. Within her first few years of leadership, Trout organized suffrage floats for parades, automobiles.

Trout actively built alliances to ensure support for suffrage legislation in 1913. She secured Governor Edward F. Dunne's backing before drafting the bill for the General Assembly. Despite challenges, including an unsuccessful amendment by Catharine Waugh McCulloch, Trout managed to push the bill through. On June 11, 1913, she effectively defended the bill from anti-suffrage opposition, leading to the passage of the Presidential and Municipal Voting Act, which extended voting rights to women for most offices. However, post-victory, the suffrage movement in Illinois became dominated by upper-class leaders, creating a rift between Trout's faction and earlier suffragists.

== Leadership and notable members ==
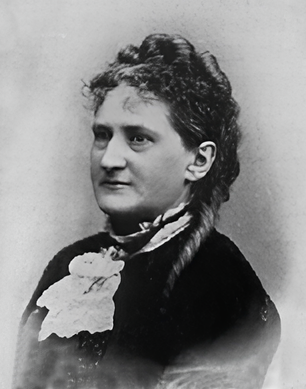
Caroline Fairfield Corbin

In the organizational structure, the key roles within the realization of the association were the President, 1st vice-president, 2nd vice-president, Secretary, and the executive committee. The leadership of the IAOESW included several prominent women who were well known in Illinois society include:

- President: Caroline Fairfield Corbin
- 1st Vice-president: Mrs. Matilda Nickerson
- 2nd Vice-president: Emma Gillett Oglesby
- Secretary: Miss Jessie Fairfield
- Miss Mary Pomeroy Green

The organized anti-suffrage movement consisted largely of well-educated, wealthy women, who were not representative of the average woman. This demographic may have limited their understanding of the broader concerns and desires of most women. Although the organization did not keep detailed records of its members, to maintain a sense of exclusivity, some known members included Mrs. Oglesby, Mrs. Blackstone, and Mrs. Matilda Nickerson, whose husbands held prominent positions such as former governor, Union Stockyard Company president, and First National Bank president, respectively.

=== Membership ===
In 1908, the IAOESW claimed a membership of 15,000 when they sent a petition to the National Republican Convention.

== Ideology ==
In their 1909 letter to the Illinois legislature, the Illinois Association Opposed to the Extension of Suffrage to Women expressed the following points:

- They reject any notion of female inferiority and believe men and women are equally capable within their designated roles.
- They argue that woman suffrage would diminish the influence of capable individuals and increase the influence of the uninformed.
- They feel their current responsibilities are already demanding and cannot be performed without sacrificing family and societal interests.
- They are satisfied with male relatives representing them in voting matters and believe this representation is more comprehensive than if women were granted the vote.
- They formally protest against the introduction of woman suffrage legislation in Illinois.

A pamphlet written by the IAOESW to Women warns that “the propaganda of Woman Suffrage is part and parcel of the world-wide movement for the overthrow of the present civilized order of society.”

=== Opposition to German suffrage ===
In March 1907, American women opposed to female suffrage, led by Caroline Fairfield Corbin, launched a campaign against German suffragists. Their efforts involve influencing the German press and Reichstag members. This intervention comes as a response to the support German Chancellor Bernhard von Bülow has given to the women's progressive movement in Germany. Prominent German suffragists, including Minna Cauer, Anita Augsburg, and Helene Stocker, criticize the American opposition, viewing it as unhelpful and counterproductive given their own struggles for recognition.

== Literature ==
Archived and digitized materials are available in Harvard's Curiosity Collection and Yale's LUX Collection Discovery.

- The Position of Women in the Socialistic Utopia (1901)
- Socialism and Christianity, with Reference to the Woman Question (1905)
- How Women Can Best Serve the State: An Address Before the State Federation of Women's Clubs, Troy, N. Y., October 30, 1907 (1907)
- The Antisuffrage Movement (1908)
- Woman's Rights in America: A Retrospect of Sixty Years, 1848-1908 (1908)
- Why the Home Makers Do Not Want to Vote (1909)
- American Women and the Ballot (1909)
- The Campaign of Noise (1909)
- To the Voters of the Middle West (1909)
- Equality (1910)
- Men and Women (1910)
- Socialism and Sex (1910)
- Facts and Fallacies About Woman Suffrage (1911)
- Fifteenth Annual Report (1911)
- Woman Suffrage and the Constitution of the United States: A Catechism Which He Who Runs May Read (1911)
- Men for the State, Women for the Home (1911)
- Dignity of Womanhood (1912)
- Modern Thought (1912)
- Where Woman's Work Is Most Needed (1912)
- Woman's Best Work: The Making of Voters (1912)
- Woman Suffrage: Is It Sure to Come? (1912)
- A World Without God (1913)
- Woman's Moral Duty (1913)
- The Mission of Mothers (1913)
- Woman's Moral Duty in the Home (1913)
- Matrimony and the Building of Homes (1913)
- Woman Suffrage, a Socialistic Movement (1913)

== See also ==
- Women's suffrage in Illinois
- Anti-suffragism
- National Association Opposed to Woman Suffrage
- Timeline of women's suffrage in the United States
