= Emma Gillett Oglesby =

American socialite and First Lady of Illinois (1845–1928)

Emma Susan Gillett Oglesby
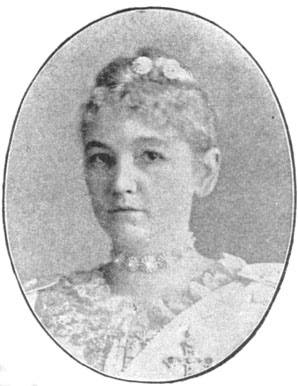

First Lady of Illinois
- In office January 16, 1865 – January 11, 1869
- Governor: Richard J. Oglesby
- Succeeded by: Malinda Ann Neely Palmer

Personal details
- Born: Emma Susan Gillett; February 11, 1845 Cornland, Illinois, US
- Died: January 14, 1928 (aged 82) Elkhart, Logan County, Illinois, US
- Party: Republican
- Spouse: Richard J. Oglesby
- Children: Hiram Gillett Keays, John G. Oglesby, Richard James Oglesby Jr., Jasper Oglesby, Felicite Oglesby, Olive Oglesby, Robert Oglesby, Emma Oglesby
- Parent(s): John Dean Gillett and Lemira Parke Gillett
- Relatives: William Barnes, Isabelle P. Vennigerholz
- Occupation: Socialite, activist

Emma Susan Gillett Oglesby (February 11, 1845 – January 14, 1928) was an American social leader, anti-suffragist activist, and the wife of Illinois Governor Richard J. Oglesby.

As the First Lady of Illinois, Oglesby was a prominent figure in state and national social circles, known for her extensive hospitality and involvement in various civic activities, including the 1893 World's Columbian Exposition.

She was also a vocal opponent of women's suffrage, serving as the 2nd vice-president of the Illinois Association Opposed to the Extension of Suffrage to Women. Oglesby married twice and had eight children.

== Biography ==
=== Early life ===
Emma Susan Gillett was born on February 11, 1845, in Cornland, Illinois. She was the daughter of John Dean Gillett (1819–1888), a prominent cattle baron, and Lemira Parke Gillett (1821–1901).

She received a well-rounded education. Until the age of sixteen, she attended public schools. Her father then arranged for her to be tutored by his cousin, a scholar of the classics, who guided her through a rigorous course of reading that included works by Shakespeare, Plutarch, Rollin, Gibbon, Guizot, Motley, Bancroft, and others. This early exposure to classical literature fostered a lifelong love of reading.

=== Later life ===
She married Governor Richard J. Oglesby, and the couple lived in Washington, D.C., during his terms as governor and U.S. senator before returning to Illinois in 1884.

As the state's First Lady, Oglesby was a prominent figure both in Illinois and nationally. She was a social leader, a board director for the World's Columbian Exposition, and gained further recognition through her international travels.

She was renowned for her extensive hospitality at Oglehurst, the family estate near Elkhart, particularly her annual Christmas dinners for the estate's tenants. The estate was also known for its impressive collection of artworks from around the world and for hosting numerous high-profile guests.

Oglesby actively participated in social and state activities, including serving on the National Woman's Committee for the 1893 World's Fair.

=== Anti-suffragist activism ===
In 1897, Caroline Fairfield Corbin, a Chicago homemaker, founded the Illinois Association Opposed to the Extension of Suffrage to Women (IAOESW). Her organization contended that women should remain in their traditional domestic roles, allowing men to legislate on their behalf.

On April 1, 1898, Oglesby attended an IAOESW meeting at her former residence at Decatur, alongside Corbin. The residence is now owned by Mary Elizabeth (Morrison) Bering. Corbin argued against women's suffrage, asserting that men were uniquely suited to fight for freedom and that women, when protected from temptations, had not proven morally superior. She believed women's involvement in politics would lead to increased immorality and intrigue.

Emma Oglesby served as the 2nd vice-president of the organization. In April 1909, they sent a broadside to the Illinois General Assembly.

== Marriage and children ==
Emma married Hiram David Keays of Bloomington, Illinois, and birthed Hiram Gillett Keays. Her husband he died in 1868.

In November 1873, she married Governor Richard J. Oglesby at her father's house in Elkhart, Illinois. Their seven children included: John Gillett Oglesby, Richard James Oglesby Jr., Jasper Oglesby, Felicite Oglesby (later known as Felicite Oglesby Cenci Bolognetti), Olive Oglesby, Robert Oglesby, Emma Oglesby.

She had a total of eight children from the combined marriages.

== Death and legacy ==
=== Gillette Memorial Arch ===
The John P. Gillett Memorial Bridge, originally a wooden structure built in 1899, was part of the Oglesby estate and was used for Governor Oglesby's funeral procession, which included Robert Lincoln.

In 1915, Emma Gillett Oglesby commissioned the replacement of the wooden bridge with a concrete one in 1915 to honor her brother, John P. Gillett. The bridge connects to Elkhart Cemetery through Gillette Memorial Arch on County Road 10.

=== Personality ===
According to The Decatur Daily Review, her charm, beauty, dignity it is said it remained notable throughout her life. She is described as the best-looking woman to have occupied the executive mansion at Springfield.

=== Death ===
In her later years, having outlived most of her friends, she turned to books for companionship. Despite being over eighty, she remained as witty and mentally active as she had been in her younger days.

Around 1926, Oglesby suffered a stroke, which left her an invalid. She died on January 14, 1928, at her family estate after a prolonged illness.

Her funeral services were held at St. John's Memorial Chapel, with Rev. Edward Haughton of St. Paul's Episcopal Church in Springfield officiating. The family requested no flowers. She was interred in the mausoleum at Elkhart Cemetery. She leaves behind relatives that included her sister, Mrs. William Barnes, and her niece, Isabelle P. Vennigerholz. Her children were present at her bedside at the time of her death.

Schmeeckle Reserve Interpreters from the University of Wisconsin-Stevens Point note a local legend associated with Elkhart Cemetery, which claims it is haunted by the ghost of Emma Gillett Oglesby.
