= Minnie Bronson =

American anti-suffragette (1863–1927)

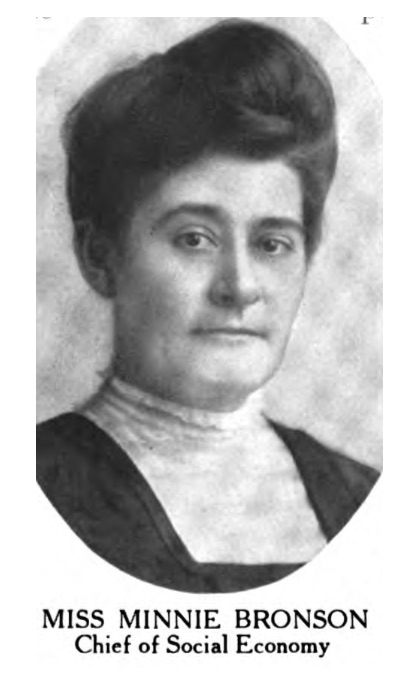
- Photograph of Minnie Bronson in the catalogue of the Jamestown Exhibition 1907
- Born: Fayette, Iowa
- Occupations: Educator, labor investigator, exposition organizer
- Known for: Anti-suffrage activism

Minnie Bronson was an American anti-suffragist activist who was general secretary of the National Association Opposed to Woman Suffrage.

== Biography ==
Minnie Bronson was from Fayette, Iowa. Her father, Harvey S. Brunson, came from Ohio and worked as a minister, a hotel operator, and a director of Upper Iowa University. Her mother, Jane McCool, was originally from Illinois. Bronson was the youngest of five siblings.

Bronson graduated from Upper Iowa University with an A.B. and M.A. During her time in university she participated in several oratorical contests; one of her competitions was attended by social reformer Jane Addams, who would comment on the performance in her autobiography.

Bronson worked as a high school mathematics teacher in St. Paul, Minnesota from 1889 to 1899. Beginning in 1900, she led the design of educational exhibits at world's fair expositions including Paris (1900), the Pan-American Exposition in Buffalo (1901), St. Louis (1904), Liège (1905), Jamestown, Virginia (1907), and Seattle (1909). She also held a number of short-term assignments working for the U.S. government, including as a Special Agent for the Bureau of Labor investigating labor conditions for women and children from 1907 to 1909 and Special Agent reporting on the New York shirtwaist strike in 1910.

During World War I, Bronson was a member of the American Committee for Devastated France and traveled throughout France. She presented about the organization's work to the Iowa Bankers Association convention in 1919.

== Anti-suffragist activity ==
Bronson served as General Secretary for the National Association Opposed to Woman Suffrage (NAOWS), the United States' leading anti-suffrage organization based in New York City. She edited their weekly periodical, the Woman Patriot, that distributed anti-suffrage opinion across the country. In December 1913, Bronson addressed the U.S. House of Representatives Committee on Woman Suffrage representing the "anti" perspective, alongside speeches given by prominent suffragists Anna Howard Shaw, Helen H. Gardener, Carrie Chapman Catt, and Ida H. Harper.

A skilled orator and organizer, Bronson was active in speaking tours and debates in New York and other states throughout the U.S., together with Josephine Jewell Dodge, the president of NAOWS. Her campaigning took her across the country including California, Nevada, South Dakota, Iowa, Minnesota, South Carolina, Massachusetts, Washington D.C., and Virginia. She also organized training classes to teach others how to dissect pro-suffrage arguments. With her background as a wage-earning woman - in contrast to many prominent anti-suffragists of the period, who came from wealthy families - Bronson was able to promote her connection with the working class in her public speaking and writing. Her events were often well-attended, though sometimes attracted significant attention and criticism from her pro-suffrage opponents. During a visit to Nevada in 1914, Bronson was escorted from the theatre where she had been speaking and, according to local news reports, "agitators" set the building on fire.

In her speeches and reports, Bronson maintained that granting the vote to women would not have a positive impact on improving women's social and economic circumstances. A frequently-referenced line of argument held that opening up the vote to all women would dilute the influence of educated and reform-minded women who were better positioned to affect the political change she desired. Before an audience of 150 women in Cambridge, Massachusetts, Bronson was reported to have said: "In attaining the ballot, we believe that the best women would throw away the advantage which is now in their hands. In shaping public opinion, the intelligent and good woman now counts immeasurably, while the ignorant and vicious woman counts scarely at nil. But at the ballot box, both would be equal."

Bronson, together with Massachusetts anti-suffragist Alice George, created a recording of the song "The Anti-Suffrage Rose" featured at the New York State Fair.

== Publications ==
- The Wage-Earning Woman and the State (1912)
- Woman Suffrage and Child Labor Legislation (1914)
