= Sophia Lonsdale =

British anti-suffragist (b. 1852, d. 1936)

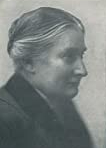
- Born: March 7, 1854; Regent
- Died: October 20, 1936 (aged 82); Weybridge
- Known for: vocal anti-suffragist

Sophia Lonsdale (1852–1936) was a British philanthropist and social activist.

== Life ==
Lonsdale was the daughter of John Gylby, canon of Lichfield and Sarah Martineau, née Jardine. Her elder sister, Margaret Lonsdale, would be a nurse and writer. She was also the granddaughter of Anglican bishop John Lonsdale. A vocal anti-suffragist, Lonsdale's name appeared on the list of signatories to "A Woman's Protest Against Female Suffrage" published in The Nineteenth Century in 1889. Lonsdale was an early organizing member of the Women's National Anti-Suffrage League and part of the group's executive committee together with Mary Ward. Her letter published in The Times in 1907 encouraged readers to sign a petition against the woman's vote, which was presented to Parliament after collecting 37,000 signatures.

In 1892, Lonsdale opened a girls' high school in Lichfield which would eventually become The Friary School. Much of her work focused on poor relief, as a member of the Charity Organization Society and board of guardians member of the Lichfield union. Lonsdale published The English Poor Laws: Their History, Principles, and Administration in 1902. She wrote the Introduction to The Slippery Slope, and Other Papers on Social Subjects by William Amias Bailward, published in 1920.

Her memoirs, The Recollections of Sophia Lonsdale, were edited by her cousin Violet Martineau (1865-1948) and published in 1936.
