= Alice Hay Wadsworth =

American anti-suffragist (1880–1960)

Alice Evelyn Hay Wadsworth
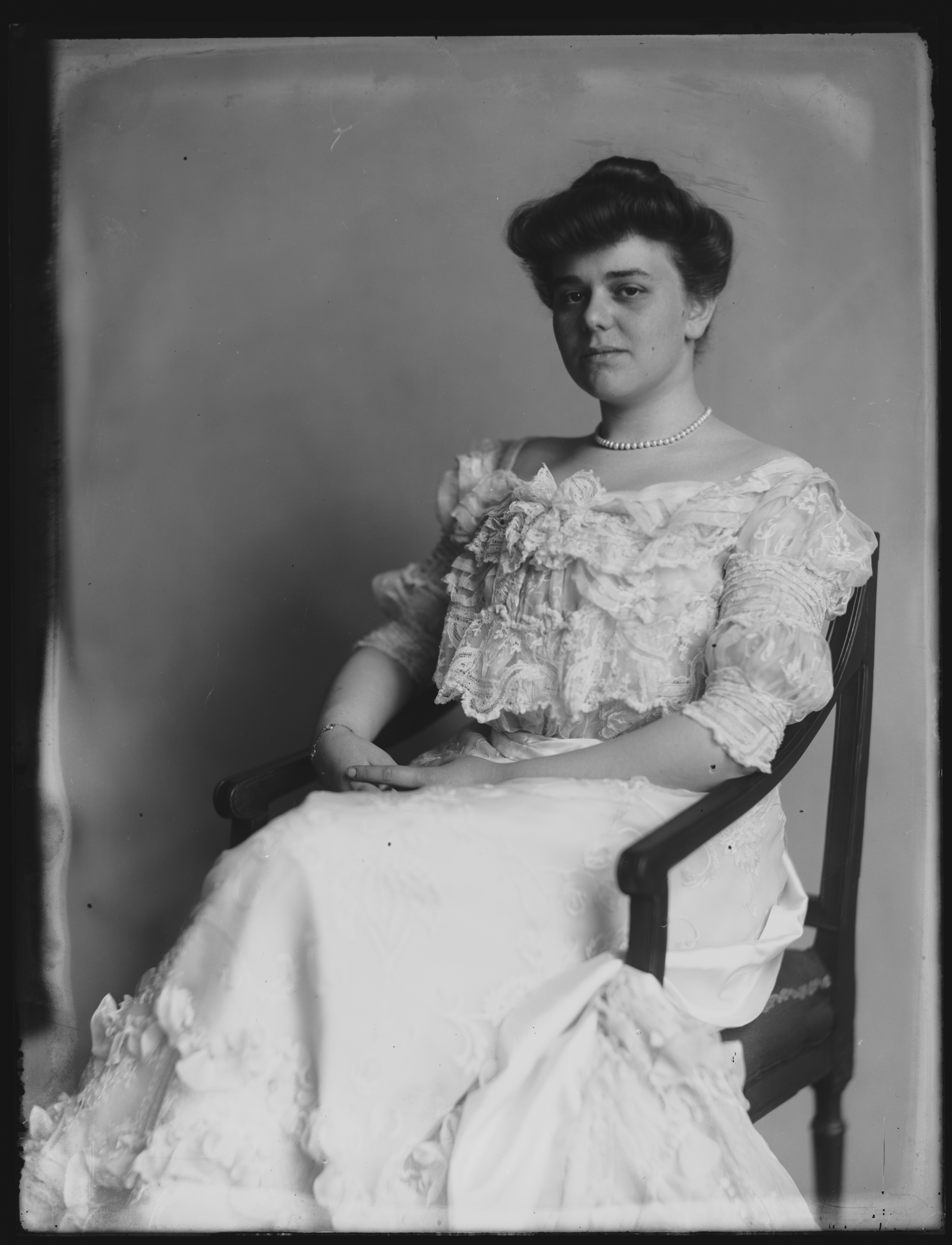
- Born: January 6, 1880; Cleveland, Ohio, USA
- Died: May 13, 1960 (aged 80); Florida, United States
- Known for: President of National Association Opposed to Woman Suffrage (1917-1920)
- Spouse(s): James W. Wadsworth Jr. (m. 1902); Jackson H. Boyd (m. 1958)
- Children: Evelyn Wadsworth
- Parent(s): John Hay (father); Clara L. Stone (mother)

Alice Evelyn Hay Wadsworth (January 6, 1880 – May 13, 1960) was an American anti-suffrage leader during the early 20th century. She was daughter of John Hay, 37th United States Secretary of State, and Clara L. Stone and was married to U.S. Senator James W. Wadsworth Jr., of Geneseo, New York in 1902.

== Activism career ==
Wadsworth was a prominent leader in the anti-suffrage movement during the early 20th century, and her husband also virulently opposed women's suffrage. The Wadsworths believed that government was a man's job, and upheld traditional gender roles. Motherhood and family were dominant themes of the argument against women's voting and becoming involved in political affairs. She linked feminism and socialism to women's suffrage, and many statements produced by the movement at the time were inflammatory and vitriolic, which became known as "Wadsworthy" tactics.

In 1917, when the U.S. became involved in World War I, patriotism was another theme used in the anti-suffrage fight. In the same year, New York State passed an amendment to its state constitution that granted New York women the right to vote. Until this time, the National Association Opposed to Woman Suffrage (NAOWS), founded in 1911 by Josephine Jewell Dodge, had been headquartered in New York City. The passage of the state constitutional amendment shifted the focus of the anti-suffrage movement to fight against the passage of a federal amendment to the U.S. Constitution. In 1917, Wadsworth replaced Dodge as president of the NAOWS, and the headquarters of the organization were moved to Washington, D.C. On December 11, 1917, while serving as president of the NAOWS, Wadsworth wrote a memorial to Charles E. Fuller, member of the U.S. House of Representatives, Committee on the Judiciary, outlining the group's continued opposition to a federal suffrage amendment. Wadsworth proposed that the issue of women's suffrage should be decided by popular vote and opposed ratification of the federal amendment through the state legislatures. Wadsworth argued that women's suffrage would be forced on individual states whose general population opposed it by the legislatures in other states that supported the amendment.

1920 brought the Nineteenth Amendment, which resulted in the dissolution of the NAOWS. Alice Hay Wadsworth ended her public opposition to suffrage and returned to her role as wife of a senator until her husband's death in 1952.

== Personal life ==
In 1958, Mrs. Wadsworth was remarried at the Wadsworth family home in Geneseo, to businessman Jackson H. Boyd of Harrisburg, Pennsylvania. Alice Hay Wadsworth Boyd died in Florida in 1960 at the age of 80 and is buried at Geneseo.
