= Annie Riley Hale =

American teacher, author and social critic

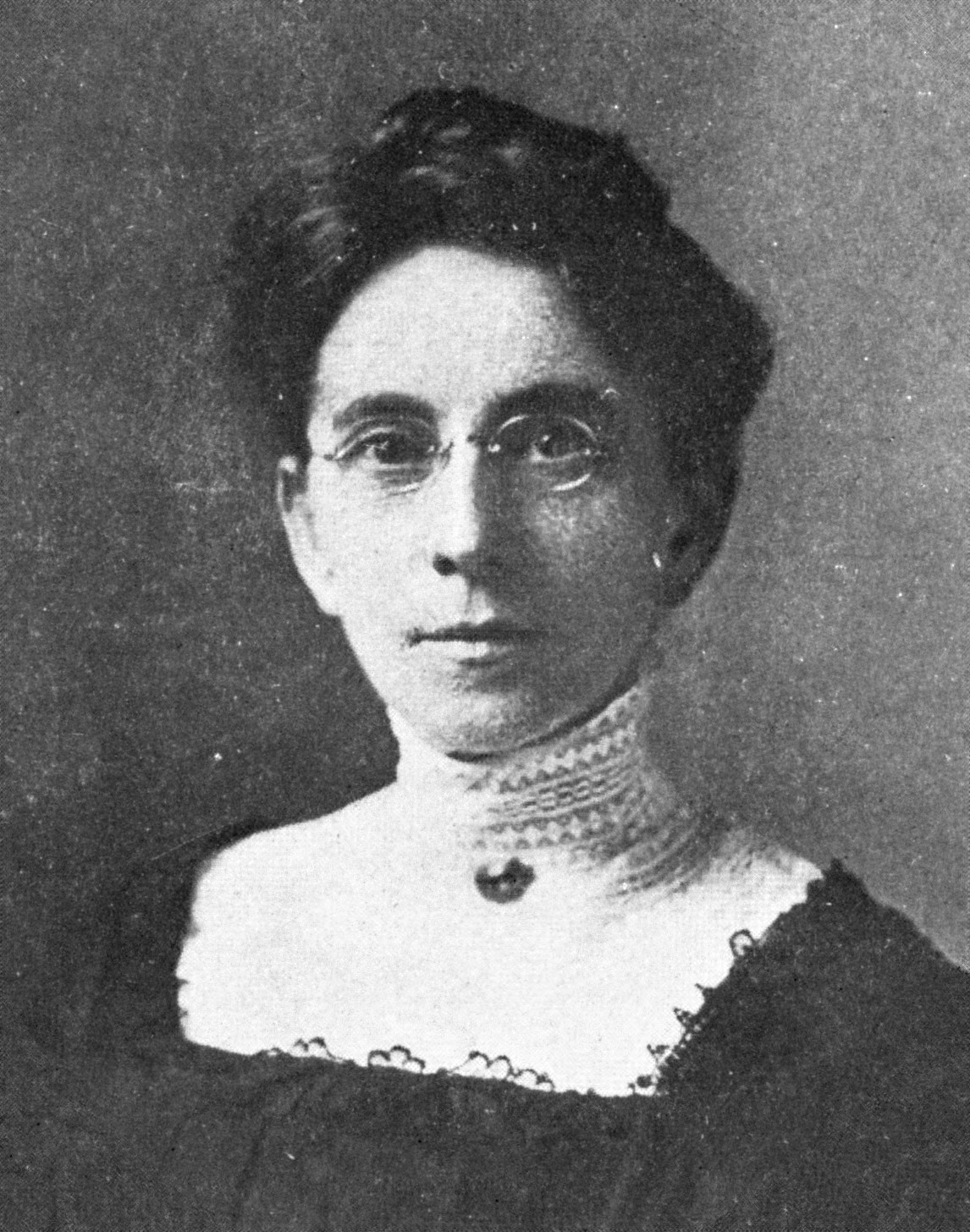
- Born: May 1, 1859
- Died: December 26, 1944 (aged 85)
- Occupations: Teacher, writer
- Spouse: James Richards Hale
- Children: 3, including Ruth Hale and Richard Hale

Annie Riley Hale (May 1, 1859 – December 26, 1944) was an American teacher, writer, and social critic. In her lifetime she was known for her criticism of Theodore Roosevelt and her anti-suffrage and anti-vaccine activity.

== Family ==
Annie Riley Hale was born in Rogersville, Tennessee in 1859. Hale was married to James Richards Hale, a lawyer, who died in 1897. She had three children, including the feminist Ruth Hale who as an adult opposed many of her mother's views. Hale was also a cousin of John K. Shields, a justice on the Tennessee Supreme Court and U.S. Senator.

== Life and work ==
Hale worked as a high school mathematics teacher in Tennessee and Washington, D.C. and, later, as a researcher for legislators. She was best known as a vocal social critic who wrote and spoke about a variety of issues throughout her life. Over the years, these positions included anti-war, anti-suffrage, anti-miscegenation, and anti-vaccine views. Hale published several articles advocating a white supremacist and anti-miscegenist approach to racial issues and corresponded with Robert Wilson Shufeldt, a scientist who held racist views. One of these articles appeared in The New York Times in 1899.

Her book on Theodore Roosevelt, Rooseveltian Fact and Fable, was published in 1908, during his second term as president. The book was reviewed positively by Daniel De Leon in The People, the weekly newspaper of the Socialist Labor Party. The head of the Republican National Committee, Charles D. Hilles, ordered over 4,000 copies of her book to be distributed to party chairmen around the country. Her book, a highly critical view on Roosevelt, was supplemented a few years later by the publication of her follow-up text, Bull Moose Trails. In a profile of Hale written by journalist Nixola Greeley-Smith, Hale criticized "the schoolboy English, the ignorant arrogance, the appalling bumptiousness of the man we had made President of the United States."

In 1917, Hale was arrested on charges of breaching the peace after speaking at an anti-war rally in Hartford. Hale ran in the 1932 California Senate election against the eventual winner William Gibbs McAdoo, polling in last place in the Democratic primary. Hale died in 1944.

=== Anti-suffrage ===
In December 1913, Hale addressed the U.S. House of Representatives Committee on Woman Suffrage alongside other pro- and anti-suffrage speakers, arguing against giving women the ballot. In 1916, Hale published The Eden Sphinx, in which she argued that women's lack of political power was due to their failure to properly influence men as mothers, and that women in the U.S. had otherwise already attained all the legal and economic rights they need. The book was reviewed in The New York Times. The following year, Hale published a pamphlet titled "Woman suffrage: Article on the biological and sociological aspects of the woman question".

=== Anti-vaccination and natural hygiene ===
After her son Shelton's death in 1920 following unsuccessful brain surgery, Hale became set against the medical establishment. In 1926, Hale defended homeopathy and authored the book These Cults, a rejoinder to Morris Fishbein's Medical Follies.

In 1935, she published The Medical Voodoo which put forward her anti-vaccination views. In the book, Hale laid out arguments against vaccination based on theories of "natural healing" as well as a critique of "medical experimentation" on the lower classes and vulnerable segments of society. The book was reviewed negatively in The American Mercury and positively regarded by alternative medicine advocate Herbert Shelton.

== Selected publications ==
- Rooseveltian Fact and Fable (1908)
- Bull Moose Trails (Volume 1, Volume 2, 1912)
- The Eden Sphinx (1916)
- Woman Suffrage (1917)
- Curing with Water (Physical Culture, 1922)
- The Constitution vs. The Local Theory of Cancer (Pearson's Magazine, 1922)
- "These Cults" (1926)
- The Medical Voodoo (1935)
- A School Ma'am Looks at Money (1940)
