= 1867 Kansas suffrage referendums =

Referendums on women's and African American suffrage

On November 5, 1867, the state of Kansas held referendums on two proposed suffrage (voting rights) amendments to its state constitution: one which would have granted women the full right to vote and another which would have granted African Americans the full right to vote. The proposed amendments had been approved by the Kansas Legislature but had to be ratified by a vote of the state's all-white-male electorate. The results of the Kansas election saw both ballot items defeated.

The women's suffrage referendum was the first-ever referendum on women's suffrage in U.S. history, and specifically sought to amend Section 1, Article 5 of the state constitution to "eliminate the word "male" from the clause defining the qualifications of an elector." The proposed African American suffrage amendment would have eliminated the word "white" from the state constitution's clause defining the qualifications of an elector.

== Background ==
In the summer of 1865, Republicans proposed a Fourteenth Amendment to the United States Constitution that would enfranchise the two million newly freed black men. This was the first time the word "male" would be introduced into the Constitution, and women were now explicitly not guaranteed the right to vote. Thus, suffragists, in an effort to secure their political rights alongside freedmen, resolved to combine the abolitionist and suffragist movements into one Equal Rights Association, an idea officially proposed by female suffrage activists Lucy Stone and Susan B. Anthony at an antislavery meeting in January, 1866. The suffragists believed they had support for the proposal from the abolitionists, who had previously supported their cause. However, when the Republican Party chose to make black suffrage part of their program during Reconstruction the Republicans began to collaborate more closely with the abolitionists, and by 1867, most were full supporters of the Republican Party. The Republican party believed that black suffrage, which was a party measure in national politics held far more prospects than women's suffrage, and the Republican cry was "this is the negro's hour."

== Women's suffrage referendum ==
1867 Kansas women's suffrage referendum
- November 5, 1867
- Eliminating the word "male" from the definition of an elector in Section 1, Article 5 of the state constitution

Results
Choice	Votes	%
Yes	9,070	31.35%
No	19,858	68.65%
Total votes	28,928	100.00%
County results
For
70–80%
50–60%
Against
80–90%
70–80%
60–70%
50–60%
Other
No Data

=== Campaigning ===
After the defeat in New York in 1867, Samuel Newitt Wood, leader of a rebel faction of the state Republican Party, arrived in Kansas by request of Stone, and invited the Equal Rights Association to help launch their women's suffrage campaign. Wood had emigrated to Kansas to prevent the extension of slavery. A true abolitionist and successful politician, Wood won election to the Kansas senate in 1867. Though he genuinely cared about women's suffrage, Wood also hoped to make his campaign in Kansas a success so that he could get enough recognition to run for national office. He directed a strong rights campaign, forcing the Republican Kansas legislature to submit two separate bills for black and women's suffrage. The Equal Rights Association tried to sway the abolitionists to campaign alongside them, but received no response. Wood, supported both women's and black suffrage, but was accused of being only interested in women's suffrage. Many abolitionists began to question Wood's motives when they thought he opposed black suffrage as a member of the house in 1864. They began to heavily criticize his campaign, accusing him of promoting women's suffrage only to defeat black suffrage. Wood actually supported Impartial Suffrage, supporting both the rights of blacks and women. Nonetheless, the equal rights campaign managed to stay afloat through the spring of 1867, due to a large female populace in Kansas that produced "the largest and most enthusiastic meetings and any one of our audiences would give a majority for women."

The 1867 defeat of women's suffrage in New York strengthened the Republicans' position against women's suffrage, and on August 31, they opened their anti-female suffrage campaign in Kansas. By the time Stanton and Anthony arrived in September, Anthony wrote that "the mischief done was irreparable," and the universal equal rights campaign, faced with a fierce Republican anti-suffragist campaign and the refusal of support from ambivalent abolitionists, had fallen apart. Stanton and Anthony, desperate for support, looked towards the Democrats, who made up one-fourth of the Kansas legislature. They, however, expressed opposition to both women's and black suffrage and refused to lend aid. One wealthy Democrat, George Francis Train, a former Copperhead, was willing to help Anthony and Stanton. Train was blatantly racist, and he campaigned by attacking black suffrage. Though his racist standpoint conflicted with the policy set forth by the Equal Rights Association, Stanton and Anthony, with no other political allies to turn to, chose to work with Train to keep women's suffrage alive in Kansas, although they had long been abolitionists.

== African American suffrage referendum ==
1867 Kansas black suffrage referendum
- November 5, 1867
- Eliminating the word "white" from the definition of an elector in Section 1, Article 5 of the state constitution

Results
Choice	Votes	%
Yes	10,529	34.95%
No	19,600	65.05%
Total votes	30,129	100.00%
For
60–70%
50–60%
Against
80–90%
70–80%
60–70%
50–60%
Other
No Data

== Result and aftermath ==
The results of the Kansas election saw both women's and black suffrage defeated, with black suffrage receiving 10,483 votes and women's receiving 9,070. With the defeat, equal rights activists were forced to realize that their campaign had failed.

The failure of the campaign stemmed from the tensions within the Equal Rights Association. The major problem arose from the fact that many members were "feminists" and abolitionists torn between supporting suffrage, or fighting for freedmen and women at the same time. While African-American men in Kansas would gain the right to vote under the Fifteenth Amendment in 1870, it would take two decades for women of all races in Kansas to win suffrage in municipal elections (in 1887), and it would take until 1912 for women to vote in all elections in Kansas.

== Primary Sources ==
- 1867 Suffrage Campaign in Kansas from Kansas Memory, the digital portal of the Kansas Historical Society
