= Laura E. Foster =

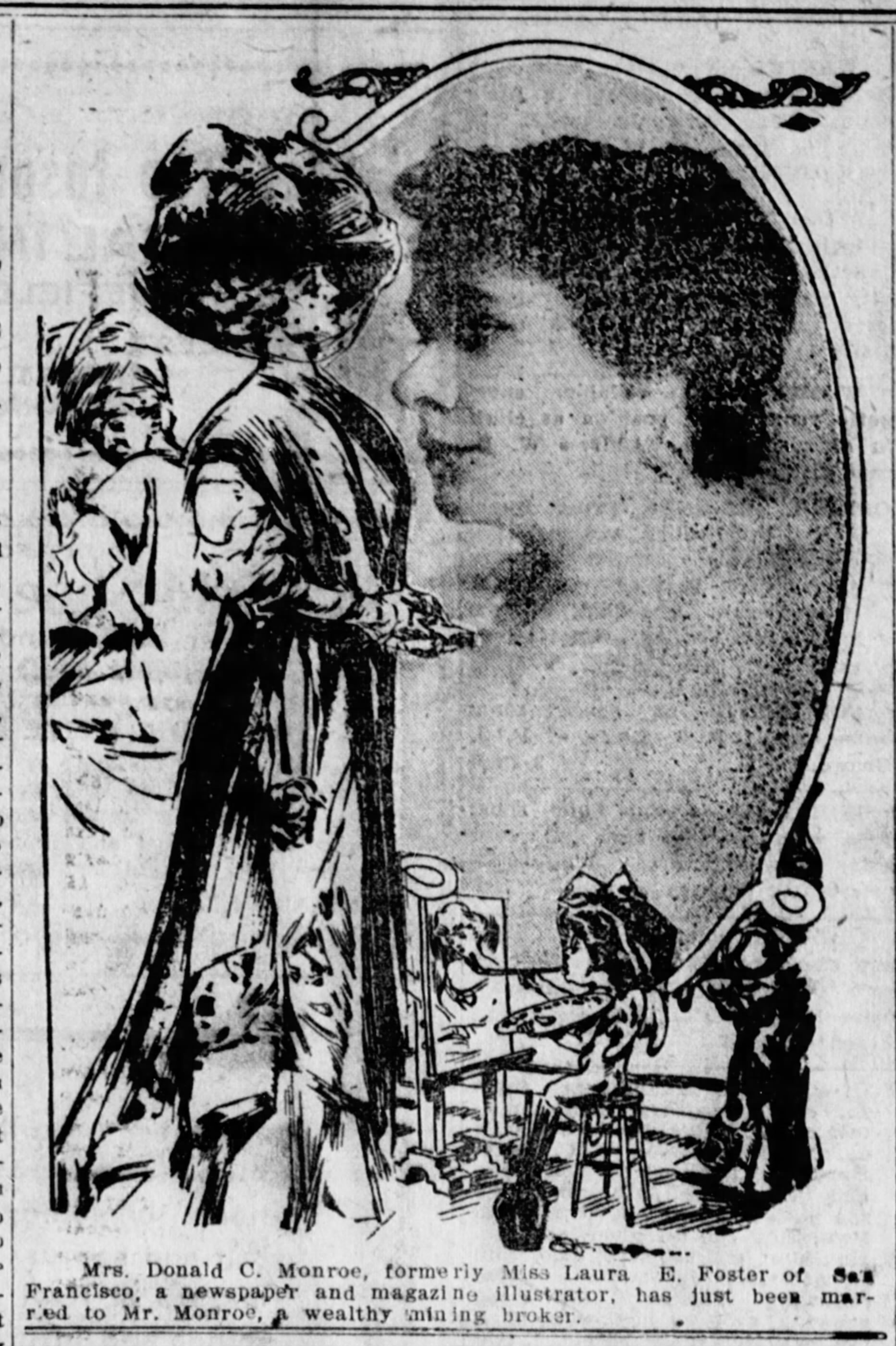
Laura E. Foster in Bluefield Evening Leader, October 6, 1908

Laura E. Foster (1871 - September 23, 1920) was an American artist, known for her illustrations and cartoons.

Foster was born in 1871 in San Francisco. Foster lived and worked in San Francisco until the earthquake of 1906, after which she moved to New York City. In 1908, she married Donald C. Monroe, but continued to work under her unmarried name.

As a professional cartoonist, her work appeared in Life, the Saturday Evening Post and other periodicals. Foster's work was often related to women's suffrage and she created images that were both pro- and anti-suffragist.

Foster died on September 23, 1920, after an operation.

== Books Illustrated by Foster ==
Chambliss, William (1895). Chambliss’ Diary; or, Society as It Really Is. New York: Chambliss & Company.

Werner, Carl (1911). The Land of Let's Pretend. Boston: H. M. Caldwell.
