= Rossiter Johnson =

American writer (1840–1931)

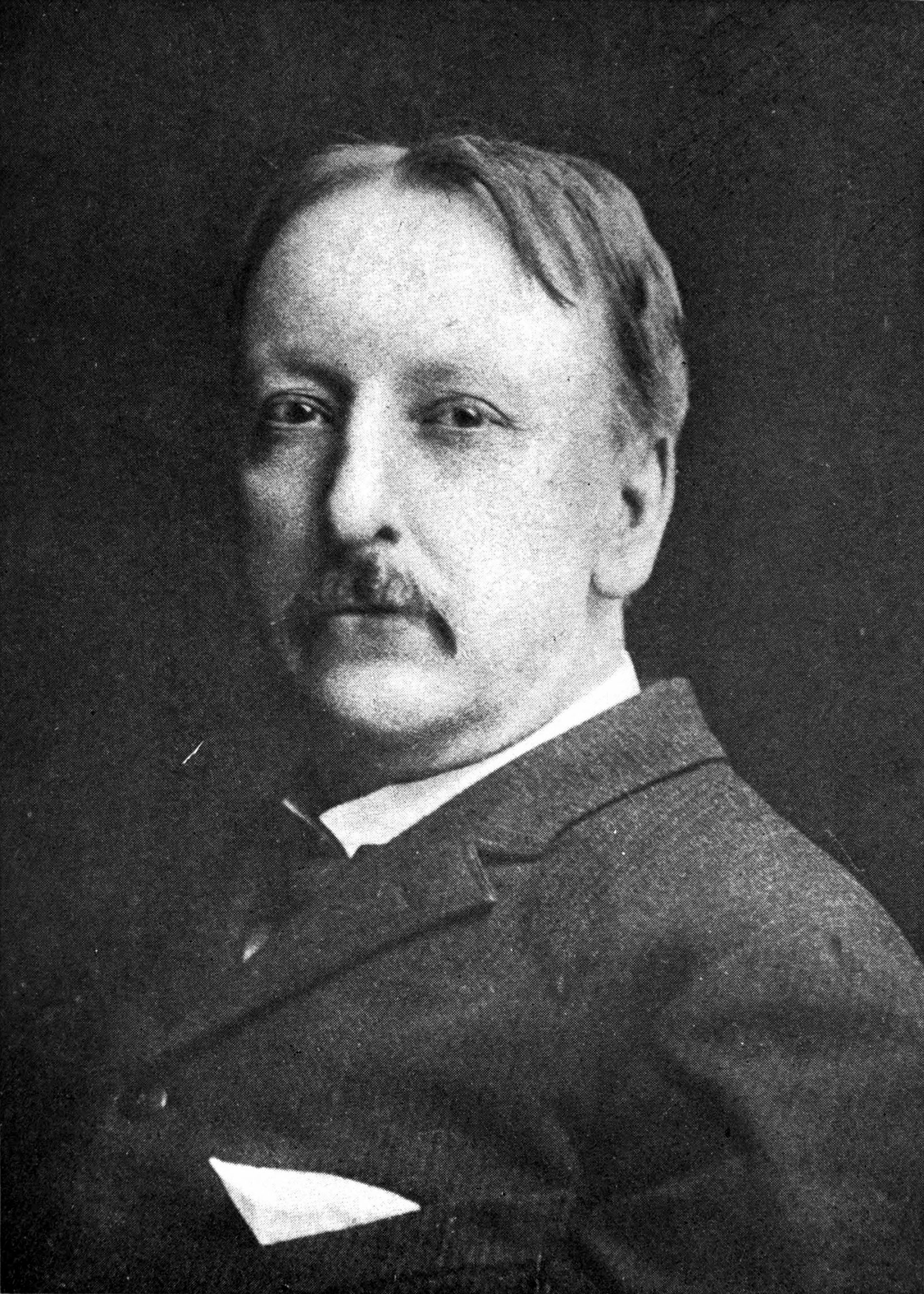

Signature
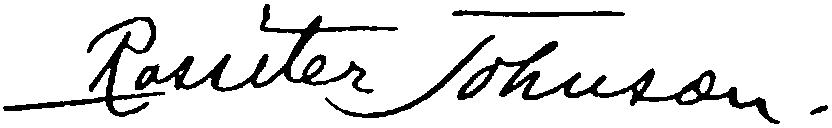

Rossiter Johnson (27 January 1840 – 3 October 1931) was an American author and editor. He edited several encyclopedias, dictionaries, and books, and was one of the first editors to publish "pocket" editions of the classics. He was also an author of histories, novels, and poetry. Among his best known works was Phaeton Rogers, a novel of boyhood in Rochester, New York, where Johnson was born.

== Biography ==
Johnson received his early education in common schools, and graduated from the University of Rochester in 1863, delivering the poem on class day. He later received the honorary degrees of Ph.D. and LL.D. from the University of Rochester.

== Works ==
=== Editor ===
From 1864 to 1868, he was connected with Robert Carter in editing the Rochester Democrat, a Republican newspaper, and from 1869 to 1872 was editor of the Concord, New Hampshire, Statesman. From 1873 to 1877, he was associated with Messrs. George Ripley and Charles A. Dana in editing the American Cyclopædia. In 1878, he edited the authorized Life of Farragut. From 1879 to 1880, he was associated with Sydney Howard Gay in the preparation of the last two volumes of Gay's History of the United States. In 1883 he became editor of the Annual Cyclopaedia, and from 1886 to 1888 was managing editor of Appletons' Cyclopædia of American Biography. From 1891 to 1894, he was on the editorial staff of the Standard Dictionary.

For six years, he was secretary of the New York Authors Club, whose sumptuous and unique Liber Scriptorum (1893) he prepared with J. D. Champlin and G. C. Eggleston. He was the editor-in-chief of The Biographical Dictionary of America published in 1906.

He devised and edited the series of Little Classics (16 vols., Boston, 1874–1875; two additional vols., 1880; 25th ed., 1887), and has also edited Works of the British Poets, with Biographical Sketches (3 vols., New York, 1876), Famous Single and Fugitive Poems (1877), Play-Day Poems (1878), Fifty Perfect Poems (with Charles A. Dana, 1882), A History of the World's Columbian Exposition held in Chicago in 1893 (4 vols., New York, 1898), World's Great Books (editor-in-chief, 50 vols., 1898–1901), Great Events by Famous Historians (20 vols., 1904), The Literature of Italy (with Dora Knowlton Ranous, 16 vols., 1906), and The Authors' Digest (1909). In 1876, he tried making abbreviated editions of some of the greater novels of the English language (4 vols., 16 mo., New York). He edited “The Literary Querist” of the Lamp (formerly the Book-Buyer).

=== Author ===
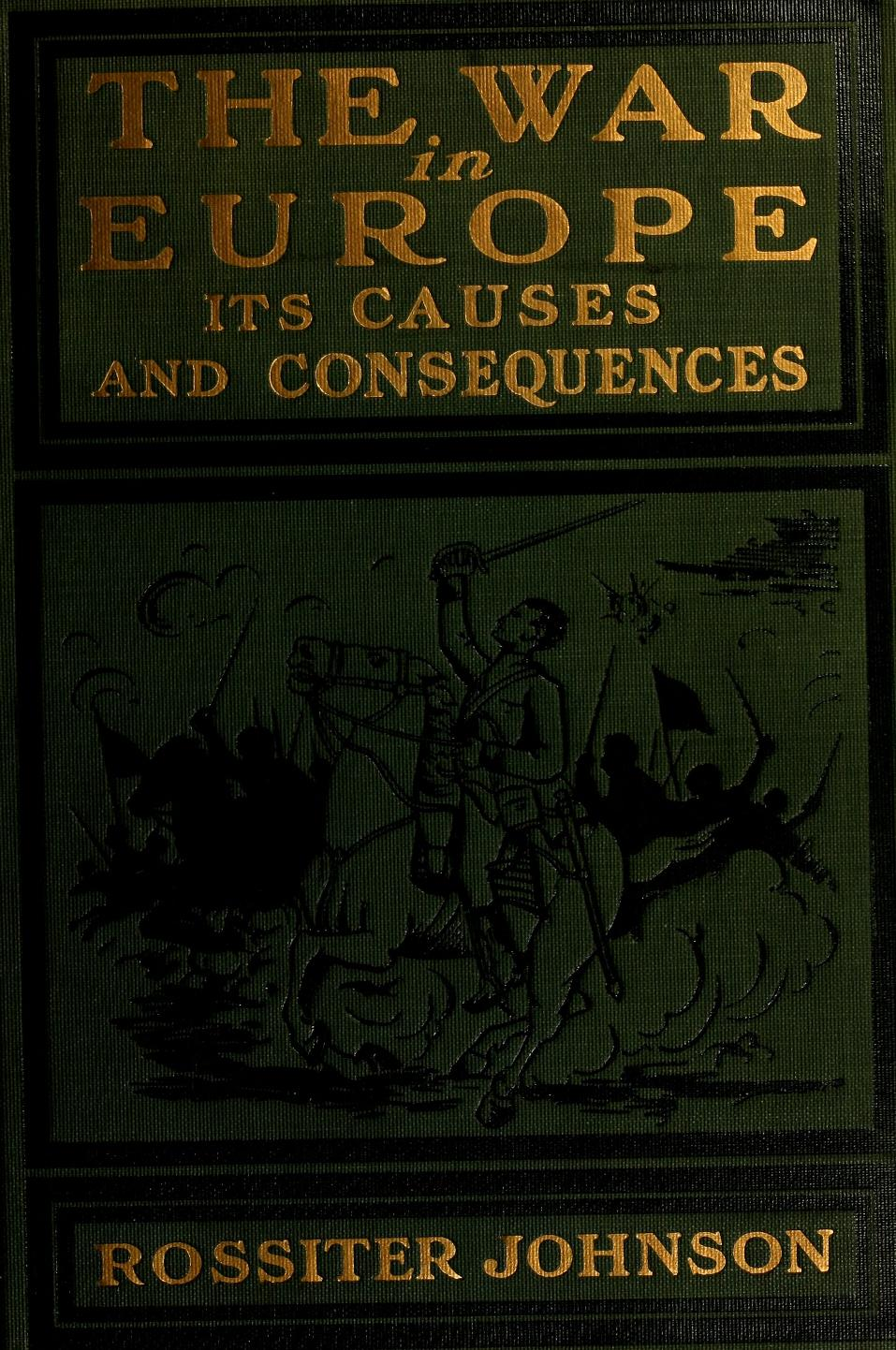
Rossiter Johnson: The War in Europe, New York, 1914 (Cover artist not credited)

Johnson made numerous contributions to periodicals, among which were those to “The Whispering Gallery” department to the Overland Monthly. He also wrote:

- Phaeton Rogers, a Novel of Boy Life, first published as a serial in St. Nicholas (New York, 1881)
- A History of the War between the United States and Great Britain in 1812-1815 (1882)
- A History of the French War, ending in the Conquest of Canada (1882)
- Idler and Poet, a small volume of verses of which the most popular is the hot-weather poem “Ninety-nine in the Shade” (Boston, 1883)
- A Short History of the War of Secession, first published serially in the New York Examiner (1888)
- The End of a Rainbow, a story (1892)
- The Hero of Manila (1899)
- Short History of the War with Spain (1899)
- Morning Lights and Evening Shadows, poems (1902)
- The Alphabet of Rhetoric (1903)
- The Clash of Nations (1914)
- Captain John Smith (1915)
- Dora Knowlton Ranous: Author - Editor - Translator (1916)
- Episodes of the Civil War (1916)
- Biography of Helen Kendricks Johnson (1917)

== Family ==
His wife was Helen Kendrick Johnson, a writer, poet, and prominent activist who opposed the women's rights movement.

His sister, Evangeline Maria Johnson, graduated from Rochester Free Academy, and in 1877 married Joseph O'Connor, a journalist and poet. She translated “Fire and Flame” (German: Feuer und Flamme) by Levin Schücking (New York, 1876), and prepared An Analytical Index to the Works of Nathaniel Hawthorne (Boston, 1882) and An Index to the Works of Shakspere (New York and London, 1887). She contributed numerous poems to periodicals, the best known of which is “Daughters of Toil.”
