= The Biographical Dictionary of America =

American biographical dictionary first published in 1906

- Page 11 from volume 1 of The Biographical Dictionary of America
- Author: American Biographical Society
- Language: English
- Subject: Reference
- Genre: Non-fiction
- Publisher: Plimpton Press, Printers and Binders
- Publication date: 1906; 120 years ago
- Publication place: United States
- Media type: Print (Paperback)
- OCLC: 848266989
- Text: The Biographical Dictionary of America at Wikisource

The Biographical Dictionary of America, or The Twentieth Century Biographical Dictionary of Notable Americans, was an American biographical dictionary first published in 1906 by the American Biographical Society. Previously published under the titles The Cyclopaedia of American Biography, 1897-1903 and Lamb's biographical dictionary of the United States (1900–1903).

== History ==
The biographical dictionary was written in English and expanded to 10 volumes. It was edited by Rossiter Johnson with the copyright, 1904, by The Biographical Society, Plimpton Press, Printers and Binders, Norwood, Massachusetts, United States. Its 1904 title was The Twentieth Century Biographical Dictionary of Notable Americans. In 1906, the publishing was limited to three hundred fifty numbered and registered copies.

It contains "brief biographies of authors, administrators, clergymen, editors, engineers, jurists, merchants, officials, philanthropists, scientists, statesmen, and others who are making history".

Rossiter Johnson wrote on December 24, 1903, in the preface of the biographical dictionary:

Recently every volume has undergone revision, to bring down to the present year every article that needed alteration or addition. The reader should bear in mind that a work as large as this cannot be put through the press in a day. The world moves, and all move with it, revolutions sometimes culminate in an hour, and Byron is not the only man that has risen in the morning to find himself famous. In a certain memorable year of our history the two great parties made their nominations for the presidency, and in an admirable and extensive work of reference, just completed, neither of the candidates was mentioned. With due allowance for such unavoidable occurrences, it is believed that these volumes will be found to contain the full story of the life of every subject, at least to a late date in 1903. The portraits and other illustrations are designed to supplement the text, and not merely to serve as ornaments.
