= Helen Kendrick Johnson =

American writer, poet, and activist (1844–1917)

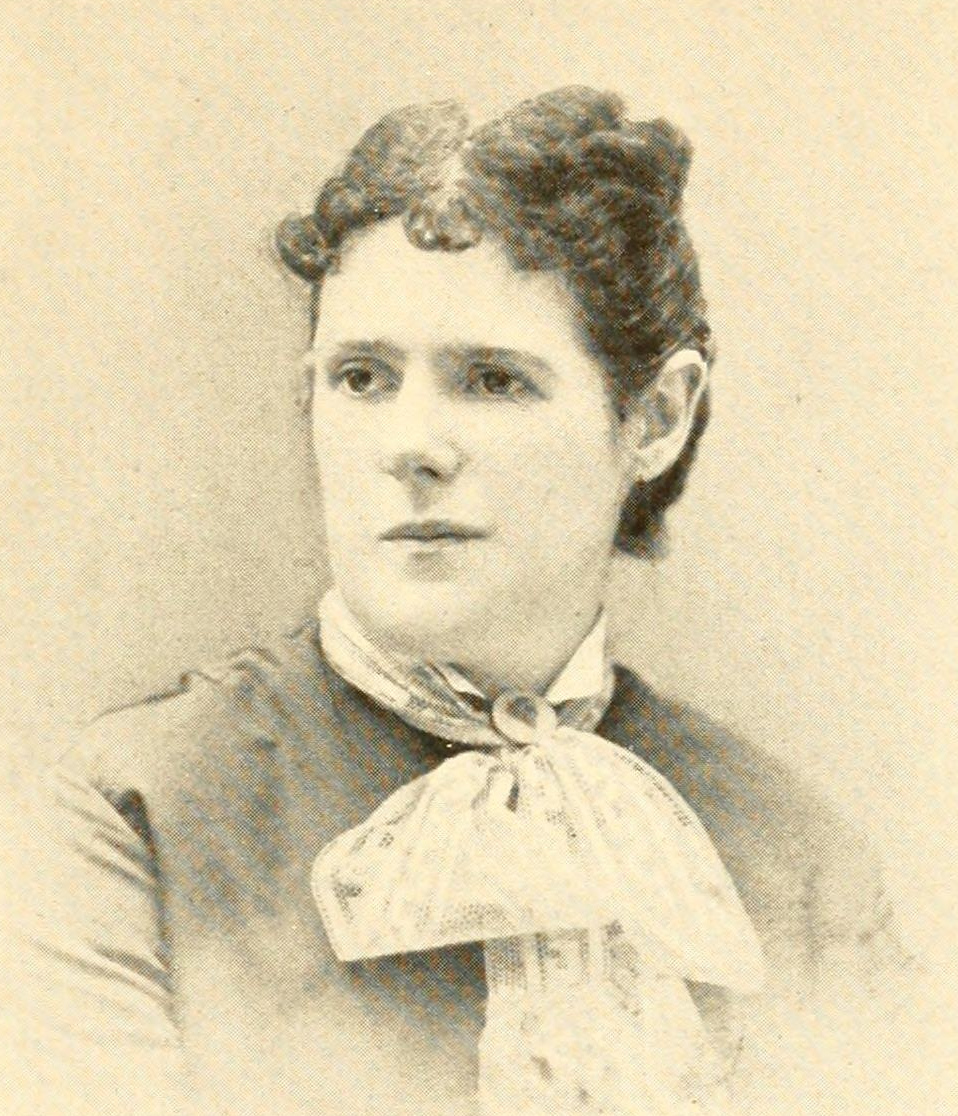
- Born: Helen Louise Kendrick; January 4, 1844; Hamilton, New York
- Died: January 3, 1917 (aged 72)
- Occupations: Children's Author, Poet, Anti-suffragist activist and writer
- Spouse: Rossiter Johnson

Helen Kendrick Johnson (January 4, 1844 – January 3, 1917) was an American writer, poet, and prominent activist opposing the women's suffrage movement.

== Early life ==
Helen Kendrick was born in Hamilton, New York to Asahel Clark Kendrick, a professor in Greek at University of Rochester and Anne Elizabeth Kendrick (born Hopkins) who died in 1851 after the birth of Helen's third sister. After the death of her mother, Helen aged 7 spent much of her childhood living with her aunt in Clinton, New York until 1860 when she spent time in Savannah, Georgia with her father's brothers leaving in 1861 due to the outbreak of the American Civil War. In 1863 she enrolled as a student in the Oread Institute, in Worcester, Massachusetts and studied there until June, 1864. After the end of the Civil War she briefly returned to Savannah and spent the rest of her childhood between there, an aunt's house in Utica, New York and her father's house in Rochester, New York where she remained until her marriage.

== Marriage and writing career ==
After marrying the newspaper editor Rossiter Johnson, in 1869 she began writing books, children's literature, and travel articles.

Johnson's papers are held by the New York Public Library.

== Activism ==
Both Helen and her husband were active in the anti-suffrage movement. From 1894–1896 she was editor of the American Woman’s Journal and founded the Meridian Club in 1886. Rossiter was author of a pamphlet entitled, Why Women Do Not Want the Ballot. In 1897 Helen wrote what is often considered the best summary of the arguments against woman suffrage: Woman and the Republic, in which she argued that women didn't need the vote to establish more legal, economic and other equality and that women's role in the domestic sphere was essential for maintenance of the American republic. She was openly critical of the writings of Elizabeth Cady Stanton and her work The Woman's Bible linking it to radicalism and socialism. During her time as an anti-suffragette activist she addressed several legislative committee in Albany and Washington and wrote many newspaper articles and pamphlets on the subject. In 1910 she founded the Guidon Club, an anti-suffragette organization dedicated to the study of politics and government.

== Books ==
- Our Familiar Songs and Those Who Made Them; more than three hundred standard songs of the English-speaking race, arranged with piano accompaniment, and preceded by sketches of the writers and histories of the songs (1881)
- Woman and the republic; a survey of the woman-suffrage movement in the United States (Appleton, New York, 1897)
