= Anti-suffragism =

Political movement that opposed women's suffrage

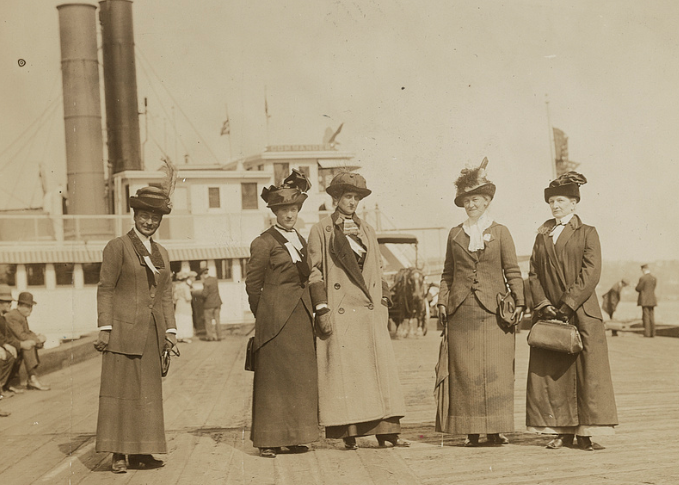
US Anti-suffrage leaders, Mrs. George Phillips, Mrs. K.B. Lapham, Miss Burham, Mrs. Evertt P. Wheeler and Mrs. John A. Church at an anti-suffrage event on the Hudson River, May 30, 1913.

Anti-suffragism was a political movement composed of both men and women that began in the late 19th century in order to campaign against women's suffrage in countries such as Australia, Canada, Ireland, the United Kingdom and the United States. To some extent, Anti-suffragism was a classical conservative movement that sought to keep the status quo for women. More American women organized against their own right to vote than in favor of it, until 1916. Anti-suffragism was associated with "domestic feminism," the belief that women had the right to complete freedom within the home. In the United States, these activists were often referred to as "remonstrants" or "antis."

== Background ==
The anti-suffrage movement was a counter movement opposing the social movement of women's suffrage in various countries. It could also be considered a counter public that espoused a democratic defense of the status quo for women and men in society.

Countries in the Western World began to explore giving women the equal right to vote around the mid 19th century, beginning with the Wyoming Territory in 1869. Areas with the most visible women's suffrage movements were Great Britain and in the United States, although women's suffrage movements took place in many Western countries. Anti-suffrage activities began to emerge in many countries as women publicly advocated for suffrage.

== Australia ==
Anti-suffrage movements were present in Australia through the 1880s and 1890s. Anti-suffrage organizations in Australia were "closely associated with the Conservative Party, manufacturing interests and anti-socialist forces." The Australian media took part in the anti-suffrage movement, and depicted women as being "weak and unintelligent," emotional and too involved in domestic and trivial matters.

The Australian anti-suffragist movement was founded on a platform of patriotism. Australia stood out as one of the few members of the British Empire where women held the right to vote at the turn of the twentieth century. Consequently, they were held accountable when the 1916 referendum on compulsory overseas military service was defeated. Publications advocating anti-suffragism utilized the emotions and politics surrounding forced enlistment for men to argue against women's enfranchisement in other parts of the empire. In the lead-up to the 1917 referendum, feminine emotionalism was cited as evidence that women had no place in politics. Newspaper coverage of the referendum placed blame on women's belief that "they would be condemning men to death if they voted 'yes'." Anti-suffragists consistently pointed to the defeat of Australia's referendums as evidence to support their assertion of the universal unreliability of women voters. Even in the face of loyal efforts by Australian women, such as those within the Australian Women's National League (AWNL), opponents of suffrage persisted in characterizing Australian women's participation in the referendums as a failure to fulfill their responsibilities.

== Canada ==
Canadian men and women both became involved in debating the women's suffrage movement in the late 19th century. Women's suffrage was debated in the Legislative Assembly in New Brunswick starting in 1885, and anti-suffrage "testimonies" began to appear in the newspapers around that time. On 3 February 1870, during the Métis provisional government meetings at Upper Fort Garry in modern-day Winnipeg in developing the Legislative Assembly of Assiniboia, Winnipeg delegate Alfred Henry Scott brought up the idea of women's suffrage to the Convention of Forty, but it appears to have been more of a rhetorical remark and was met with laughter by the other delegates.

== Great Britain ==
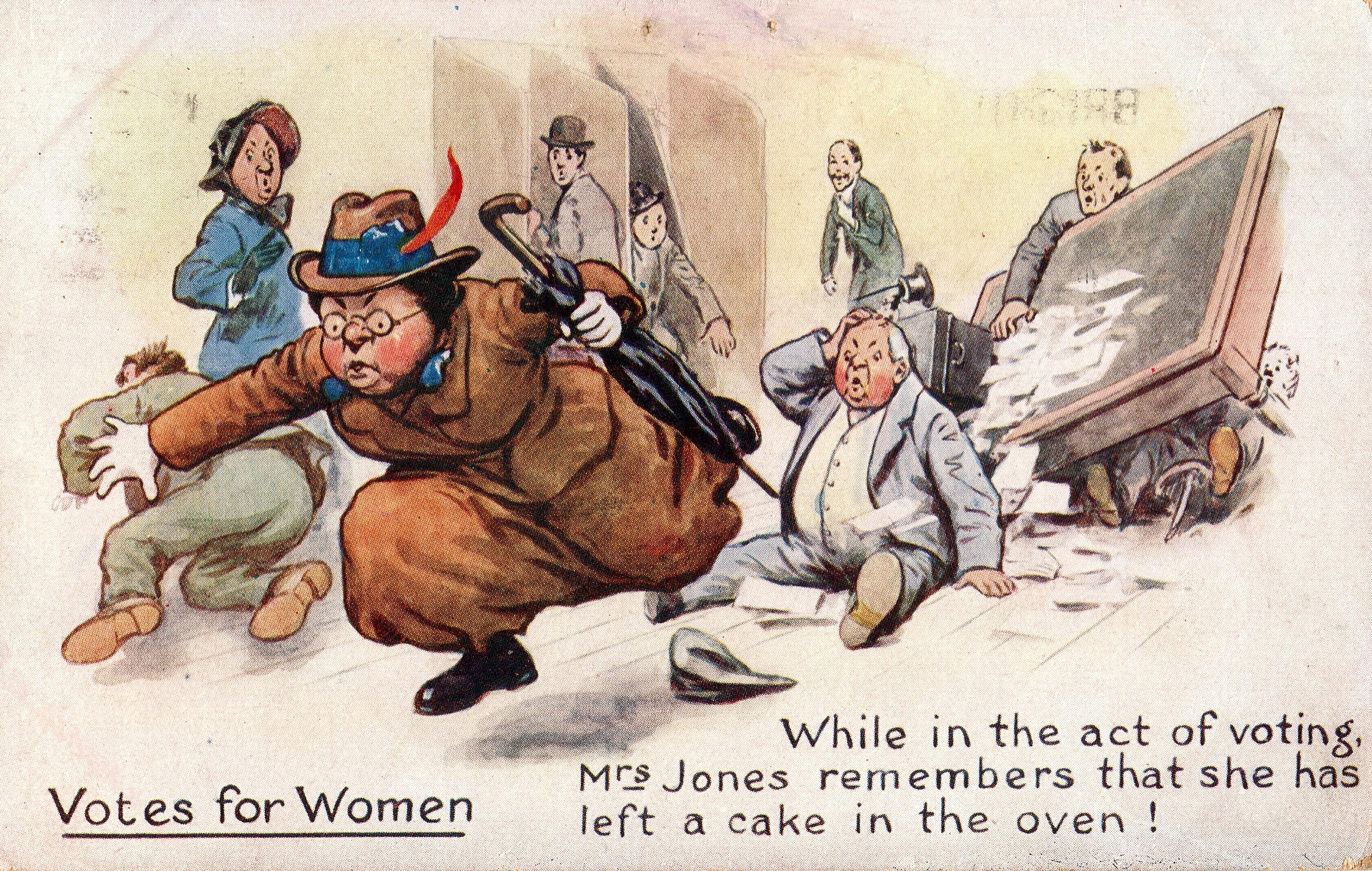
Anti-suffrage postcard- "While in the act of voting"

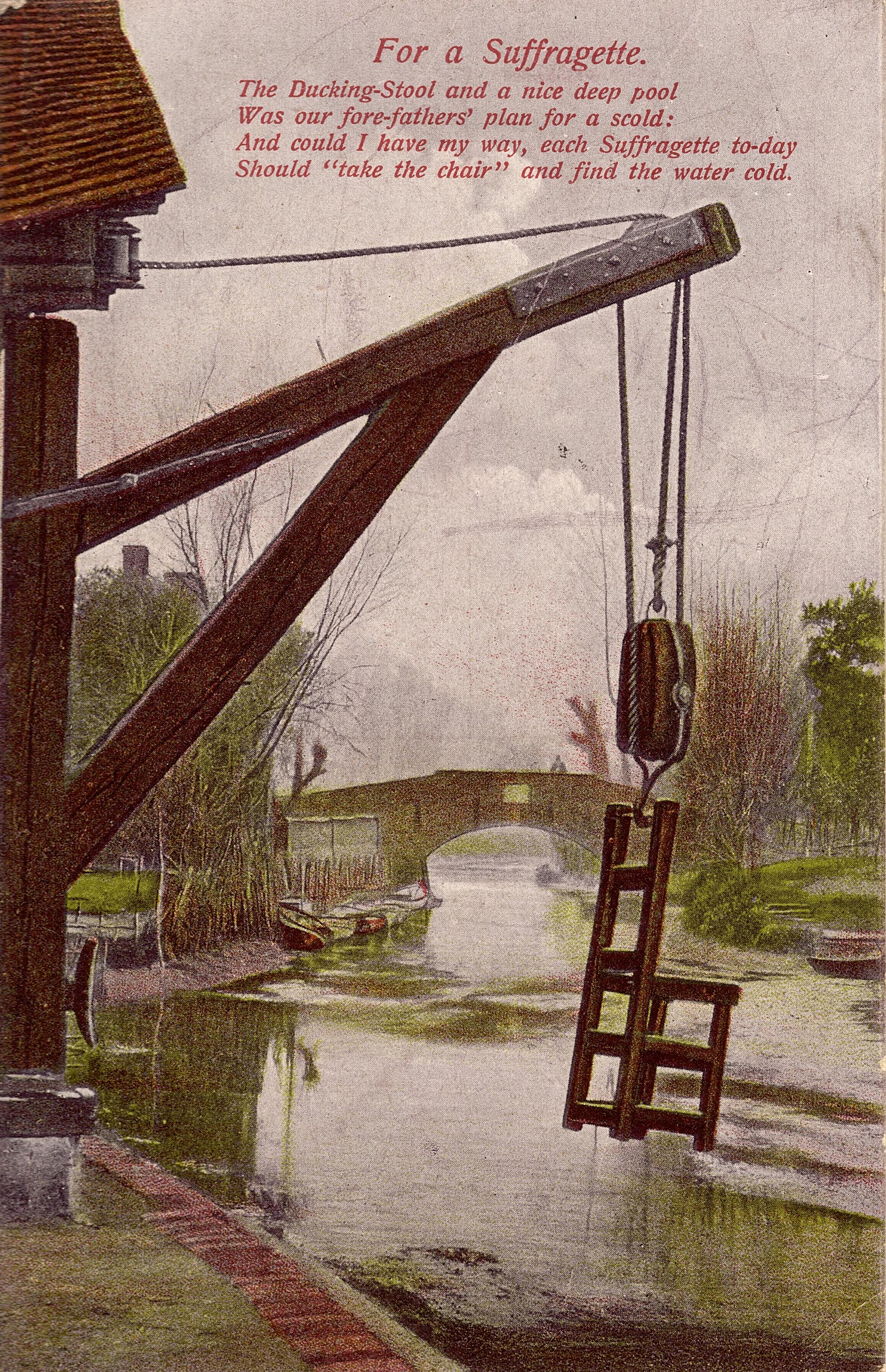
Anti-suffrage postcard "For a Suffragette the Ducking-Stool"

Organized campaigns against women's suffrage began in earnest in 1905, around the same time that suffragettes were turning to militant tactics. In general, most ordinary women had prioritized domestic and family life over paid employment and political activism when it came to the issue of suffrage. Most historical evidence shows that ordinary women did not have much interest in the right to vote before the first World War and also after suffrage had been granted to women.

The Women's National Anti-Suffrage League was established in London on 21 July 1908. Its aims were to oppose women being granted the vote in British parliamentary elections, although it did support their having votes in local government elections. It was founded at a time when there was a resurgence of support (though still by a minority of women) for the women's suffrage movement.

The Women's National Anti-Suffrage League, publisher of the Anti-Suffrage Review, submitted a petition to Parliament in 1907 with 87,500 names, but it was rejected by the Petitions Committee of Parliament as "informal". The Anti-Suffrage Review also used shame as a tool to fight against the suffrage movement.

An Anti-suffrage correspondence had taken place in the pages of The Times through 1906–1907, with further calls for leadership of the anti-suffrage movement being placed in The Spectator in February 1908. Possibly as early as 1907, a letter was circulated to announce the creation of a National Women's Anti-Suffrage Association and inviting recipients to become a member of the Central Organising Committee or a member. It was issued under the names of thirty peeresses who would become prominent anti-suffragists, as well as a number of peers and MPs. However, the first meeting of the Women's National Anti-Suffrage League only took place the following year on 21 July, at the Westminster Palace Hotel with Lady Jersey in the chair. Seventeen persons were nominated to the central committee at this meeting, including Mrs Humphry Ward in the chair of the Literary Committee and Gertrude Bell as secretary. Other members were Mrs. Frederic Harrison, Miss Lonsdale, Violet Markham and Hilaire Belloc MP. Beatrice Chamberlain served as the editor of the Anti-Suffrage Review.

The League's aims were to oppose women being granted the parliamentary franchise, though it did support their having votes in local and municipal elections. It published the Anti-Suffrage Review from December 1908 until 1918. It gathered 337,018 signatures on an anti-suffrage petition and founded the first local branch in Hawkenhurst in Kent. The first London branch was established in South Kensington under the auspices of Mary, Countess of Ilchester. Soon after, in May 1910, a Scottish branch was organised into the Scottish National Anti-Suffrage League by the Duchess of Montrose. By December of that year, there were 26 branches or sub-branches in the country, a total which grew to 82 by April 1909, and 104 in July 1910. It was announced that 2000 subscriptions had been received by December, 1908, rising to 9000 in July, 1909.

In 1910, the group amalgamated with the Men's League for Opposing Woman Suffrage to form the National League for Opposing Women's Suffrage with Lord Cromer as president and Lady Jersey as vice-president. The merger was in effect a takeover, as the president of the former organization, Lord Cromer, became president of the new one. In 1912 Lord Curzon and Lord Weardale became joint presidents. By 1914, there were around 15,000 members. The organization continued its activities and the publication of the Anti-Suffrage Review until 1918 when both came to an end as women's suffrage was granted.

=== Reasons for suffrage opposition ===
The opposition to the right for women to vote was a multifaceted phenomenon in which women themselves played a major part. One reason for women's opposition was their belief that women were equal to men (although women were expected to be "equal" in different spheres from men); and that women already had significant moral authority in society, which they would lose if they entered the seemingly corrupt world of partisan politics. Anti-suffragists were also appalled by the violent tactics of suffragettes, who had attacked Members of Parliament with whips and a hatchet.

Many female maternal reformers, who sought to protect women's defined spheres of motherhood, education, philanthropy, and civil service, felt that women were the better sex for preserving British society through social service to their communities rather than by being involved with politics. Many women had little desire to participate in politics, and believed that to do so was women just imitating men, instead of using the moral authority that came from being "real women." Some feared that the right to vote would lead to "uninformed" women in making decisions on important political matters. Since Britain was in the process of colonizing other regions around the globe, some viewed the right to vote as a threat to their imperial power as it would make the British look weak to other nations who were male oriented still. Some suffragist female groups developed militant and violent tactics which tarnished the image of women as peaceful people that the anti-suffragists had been striving to preserve. Anti-suffragists used these acts as reasons to show that women were unable to handle political matters and that both genders had different strengths.

Women writers promoted anti-suffragism through their wide readerships by raising questions of what ideal women were to be like.

Some 250,000 women signed a petition against enfranchisement, one such woman was Gertrude Bell, a paleontologist, who argued that the majority of women simply lacked the education to properly engage in political debate, making the whole issue pointless.

== Ireland ==
Women's suffrage movements had been going on in Ireland since the 1870s. However, as Suffragettes in Ireland became more militant, more organized anti-suffrage campaigns emerged. An Irish branch of the Women's National Anti-Suffrage League was started in 1909 in Dublin. This branch of the League also opposed suffrage in Britain as well.

=== Reasons for suffrage opposition ===
Irish opposition to the women's vote was both religious and cultural. Both Catholic and Protestant churches in Ireland wanted women's influence to remain domestic in nature. Women were closely associated with their husbands for legal and political purposes and it was argued that husband's votes were sufficient to allow a woman's political expression.

Irish nationalism also played a role in anti-suffrage movements. Because of the nationalistic movements going on in Ireland, both men and women nationalists opposed giving women the vote because they were prioritizing Irish Home Rule. A nationalist paper, Bean na hÉireann, which was published by the Inghinidhe na hÉirann (Daughters of Ireland), took a very anti-suffrage stance.

== United States ==
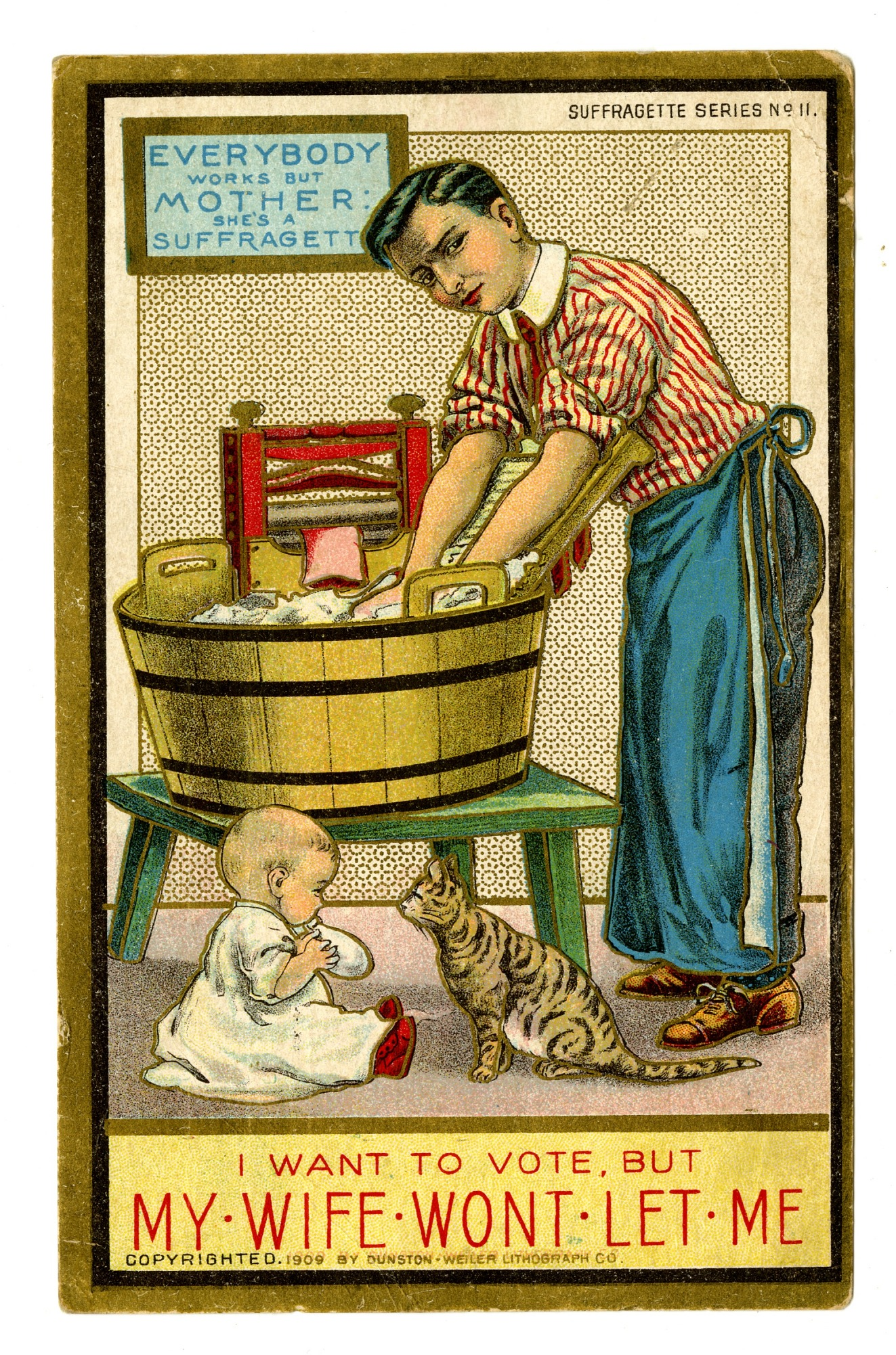
Anti-suffrage postcard, 1909

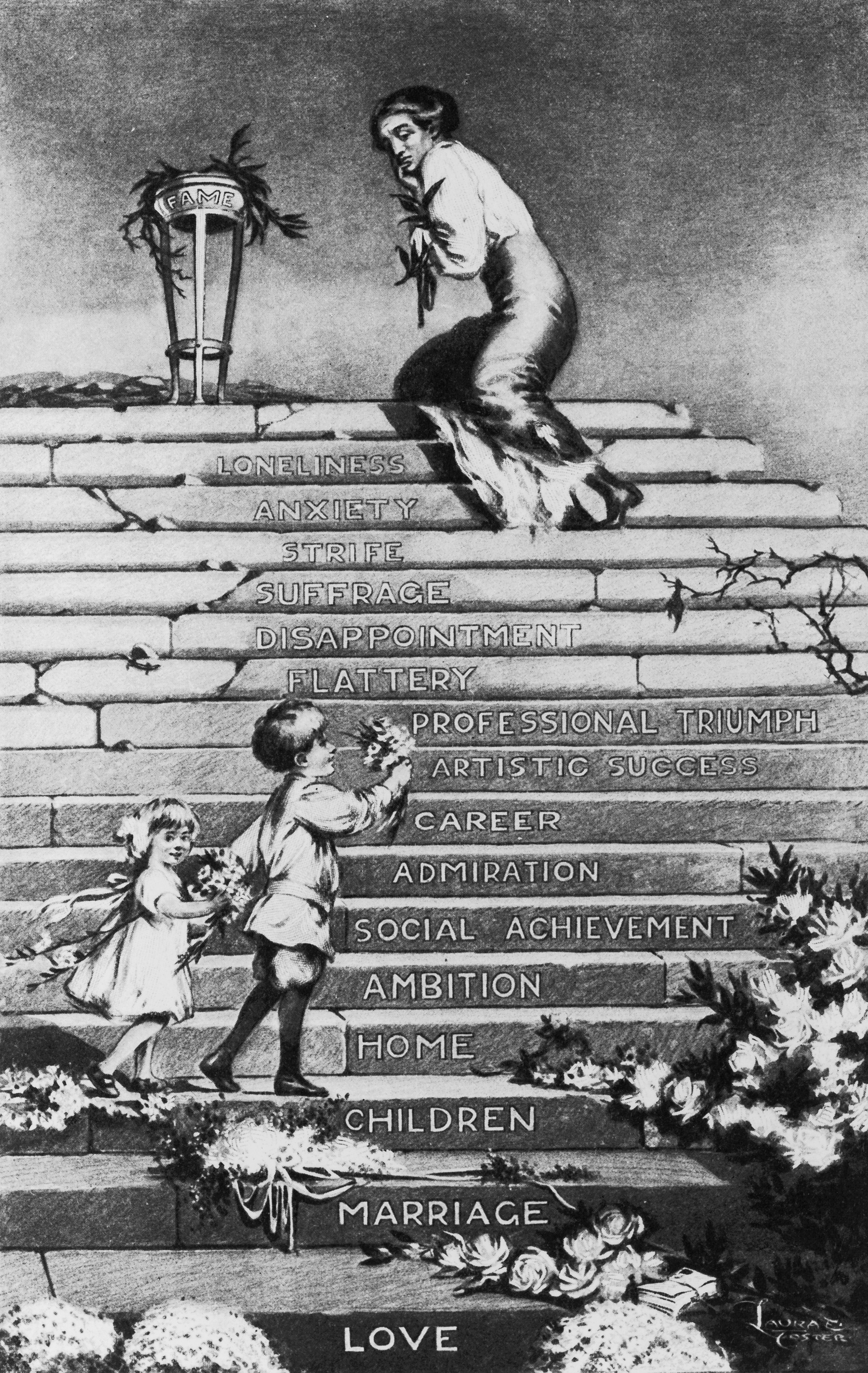
"Looking backward" by Laura E. Foster, 1912

The American Revolution established universal ideas of equality and natural rights as the hallmark of American policy. This juxtaposed women's customary and now legal exclusion with the public sanctions they had been granted to act politically in the role of the Republican wife or mother and the competency displayed by female politicians. An expanding franchise for white men, moved political action indoors and women to the periphery. By expanding the franchise to include all white men, Americans "devised a social order in which supposed biological differences, as defined by gender and race, determined relative status."

While men were involved in the anti-suffrage movement in the United States, most anti-suffrage groups were led and supported by women. In fact, more women joined Anti-suffrage groups than suffrage associations, until 1916. While these groups openly stated that they wanted politics to be left to men, it was more often women addressing political bodies with anti-suffrage arguments. The first women-led anti-suffrage group in the United States was the Anti-Sixteenth Amendment Society. The group was started by Madeleine Vinton Dahlgren in 1869. During the fight to pass the nineteenth amendment, women increasingly took on a leading role in the anti-suffrage movement.

Helen Kendrick Johnson's Woman and the Republic (1897) was a lauded anti-suffrage book that described the reasons for opposing women's right to vote. Other books, such as Molly Elliot Seawell's The Ladies' Battle (1911), Ida Tarbell's The Business of Being a Woman (1912), Grace Duffield Goodwin's Anti-Suffrage: Ten Good Reasons (1915) and Annie Riley Hale's The Eden Sphinx (1916) were similarly well received by the media and used as a "coherent rationale for opposing women's enfranchisement."

Anti-suffrage dramas were also published between the mid-1800s and up to the 1920s. The first playwright to create anti-suffrage plays was William Bentley Fowle, who wrote the one-act play for amateurs, Women's Rights, published in 1856. Later plays were adapted for the professional stage, such as The Rights of Man (1857) by Oliver S. Leland and Election Day (1880) by Frank Dumont. Nellie Locke published an anti-suffrage drama in 1896, called A Victim of Women's Rights. Many anti-suffrage dramas were overtly political and incorporated the use of farce to paint suffragists as "self-absorbed" and "mannish in dress and manner." They also criticized the idea of the New Woman in general and advocated for women and men to occupy separate spheres of influence.

The Remonstrance, a journal published by the Massachusetts Association Opposed to the Further Extension of Suffrage to Women (MAOFESW) between 1890 and 1920 was used to promote anti-suffrage ideas and also to react to and refute the claims of suffragists.

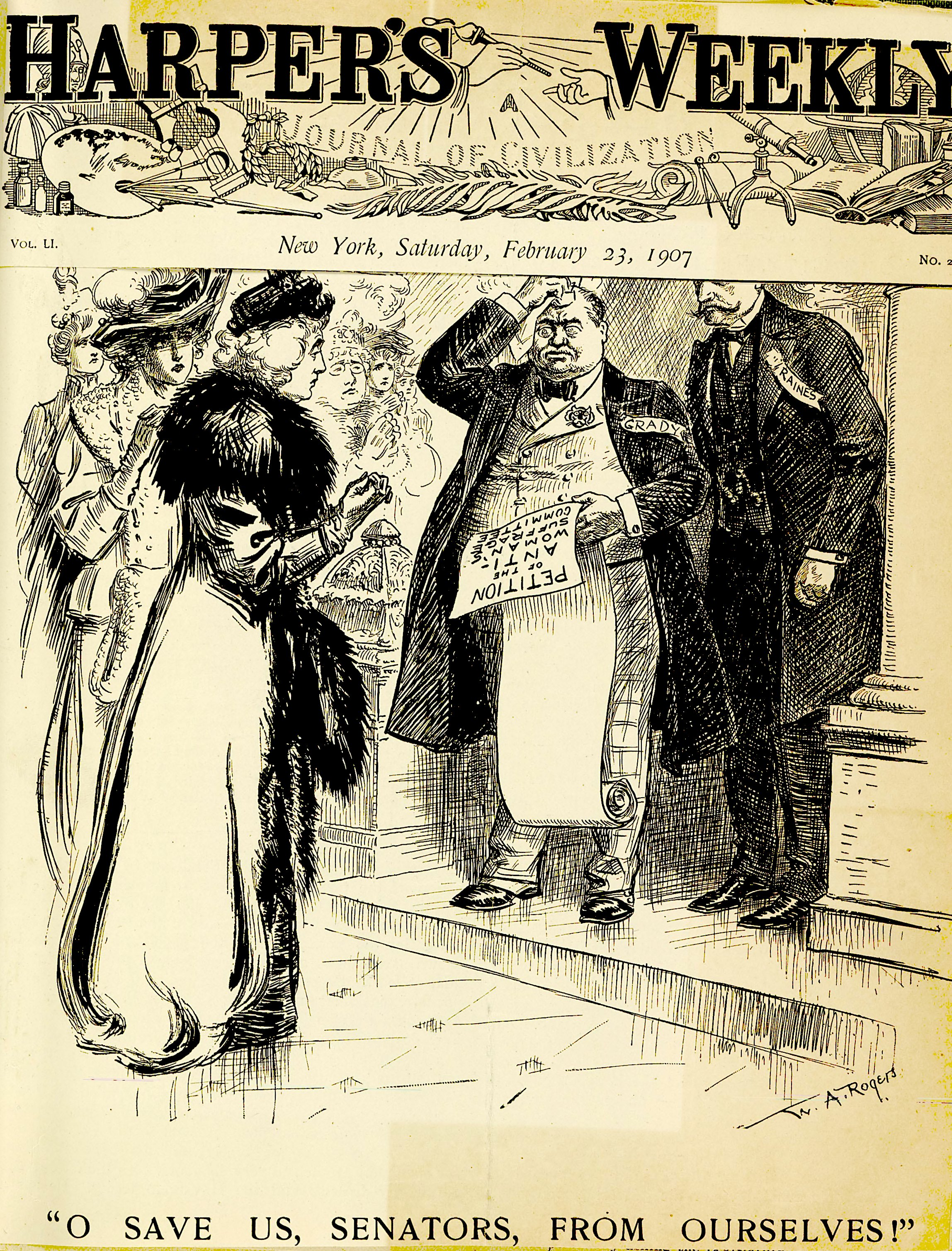
A political cartoon in Harper's lampoons the anti-suffrage movement (1907).

=== Early backing for the anti-suffrage movement ===
The anti-suffrage movement began in the United States after the Massachusetts State legislature introduced a proposal to promote female voting rights. Two hundred women opposed this initiative as they did not want women to gain full citizenship. Though nothing became of this proposal, its introduction mobilized the suffrage movement on both sides.

In 1871, a petition to the United States Congress was published by nineteen women in Godey's Lady's Book and Magazine in opposition to votes for women, the first instance of the mobilization from anti-suffrage women.

Women turned out at the New York State Constitutional Convention in 1894 to protest women's suffrage.

=== Emergence of anti-suffrage organizations ===
In 1895, the Massachusetts Association Opposed to the Further Extension of Suffrage to Women (MAOFESW) was created and is noted to be the first effort of the anti-suffragists to institutionalize their cause. In Des Moines, Iowa, 35 women formed the Iowa Association Opposed to Woman Suffrage in 1898. California, Illinois, New York, Oregon, South Dakota and Washington all formed groups by 1900. Ohio formed an anti suffrage group, the Ohio Association Opposed to Woman Suffrage in 1902.

The New York State Association Opposed to Woman Suffrage was founded in 1897, and by 1908 it had over 90 members. It was active in producing pamphlets and publications explaining their views of women's suffrage, until the Nineteenth Amendment to the United States Constitution was passed in 1920. A Geneva branch was founded in 1909. The suffragists in New York often extended invitations to open discussion with the anti-suffragists. The New York association had its own magazine, The Anti-Suffragist, published by Mrs. William Winslow Crannell from July 1908 to April 1912.

The National Association Opposed to Woman Suffrage (NAOWS) was the first national organization of women who challenged the fight for women's suffrage. Several state associations assembled for an anti-suffrage convention in New York City and formed the NAOWS. The association gained significant momentum between 1912 and 1916 and was operational in twenty-five states. The NAOWS was said to have as many as 350,000 members. At the start, the organization was run by Josephine Dodge and Minnie Bronson. Alice Hay Wadsworth, wife of James Wolcott Wadsworth Jr., assumed leadership of the association when it moved its headquarters from New York to Washington, D.C. in 1917. NAOWS produced The Woman's Protest, a newsletter that helped defeat close to forty woman suffrage referendums.

Everett P. Wheeler, a lawyer from New York, created the Man-Suffrage Association Opposed to Woman Suffrage in 1913. This organization was made up of powerful and affluent men and started out with around 600 members opposed to women's suffrage.

=== Friction over the Fifteenth Amendment ===
The cause of anti-suffragism was furthered by the friction between the women's and black suffrage movements prior to the ratification of the Fifteenth Amendment. The connection between the two movements arose during the 1830s when abolitionist activists' rhetoric linked the subordination of enslaved people to the marginalization of women. Figures like William Lloyd Garrison, leader of the American Anti-Slavery Society, advocated for the collaboration of women and blacks in their respective causes. However, other abolitionists argued that simultaneous promotion of women's rights would detract from the cause of black suffrage.

By 1869, a split between race and gender had formed. Pioneers of the women's suffrage movement, such as Elizabeth Cady Stanton and Susan B. Anthony, adopted overtly racist rhetoric that served to distance the causes of women's and black suffrage. This division has been attributed to a number of factors, including personal biases of women suffragists. However, some scholars argue for a reexamination of the assumption that women's suffrage was "ahead of its time" during the Reconstruction era.

Relations between the two movements soured when the 1867 Kansas suffrage referendum proved unsuccessful for both causes. Women suffragists found themselves unable to endorse the conditions of the Fifteenth Amendment, which granted voting rights to black men but omitted provisions for women's suffrage. Historian Faye E. Dudden suggests that the content of Stanton and Anthony's speeches in the year prior to the Fifteenth Amendment's ratification indicates their belief that they were capitalizing on a historic moment of political opportunity that would not recur in their lifetime.

Wendell Phillips, a trustee of the Hovey Fund, denied access to the capital necessary to launch their campaign. Consequently, the conflict over money misdirected the suffragists' attentions from Phillips to the Black Suffragism movement he funded instead. Ultimately, the instability between the two parties would prolong the cause of anti-suffragists for another fifty years until the Nineteenth Amendment was ratified in 1920.

=== World War I ===
Anti-suffragists helped contribute to war relief work during World War I. NAOWS contributed to the Belgian war relief effort. Many anti-suffrage groups highlighted their charitable efforts, painting themselves as "self-sacrificing." They wanted the country to see that women could make a difference without the vote, however, it was partly the efforts of women aiding the war that helped women gain the vote in the end.

=== Reasons for suffrage opposition ===
There were several concerns that drove the anti-suffrage argument. Anti-suffragists felt that giving women the right to vote would threaten the family institution. Illinois anti-suffragist, Caroline Corbin felt that women's highest duties were motherhood and its responsibilities. Some saw women's suffrage as in opposition to God's will. Antis such as Catharine Beecher and Sara Josepha Hale both shared a religiously based criticism of suffrage and believed women should be only involved with Kinder, Küche, Kirche (children, kitchen and church). Some anti-suffragists did not want the vote because they felt it violated traditional gender norms. Many anti-suffragists felt that if women gained the vote there would be an end to "true womanhood."

There were also those who thought that women could not handle the responsibility of voting because they lacked knowledge of that beyond the domestic sphere and they feared the government would be weakened by introducing this ill-informed electorate. Anti-suffragists did not see voting as a "right," but as a "duty" and that women already had their own unique responsibilities and duties in the domestic sphere. Also, since Antis believed that governments had authority due to "force," women wouldn't be able to "enforce the laws they may enact."

Anti-suffragists, such as Josephine Dodge, argued that giving women the right to vote would overburden them and undermine their privileged status. They saw participation in the private sphere as essential to a woman's role and thought that giving them public duties would prevent them from fulfilling their primary responsibilities in the home. Anti-suffragists claimed that they represented the "silent majority" of America who did not want to enter the public sphere by gaining the right to vote. Being against women's suffrage didn't mean, however, that all Antis were against civic pursuits. Jeanette L. Gilder, a journalist, wrote "Give women everything she wants, but not the ballot. Open every field of learning, every avenue of industry to her, but keep her out of politics." Dodge encouraged women to become involved in "charitable, philanthropic and educational activities." It was also cited that women had made reforms such as raising the age of consent without the vote and that gaining this right was, therefore, unnecessary and could even be harmful to further reform movements. The thought was that women were able to influence the government because they were seen as politically neutral and non-partisan and giving them the right to vote would strip them of this unique position. In addition, because voting is "only a small part of government," they believed there was no need to vote in order to participate in politics. This particular line of reasoning, that women should stay out of politics, kept the General Federation of Women's Clubs (GFWC) from officially endorsing suffrage until 1914.

Anti-suffragism was not limited to conservative elements. The anarchist Emma Goldman opposed suffragism on the grounds that women were more inclined toward legal enforcement of morality (as in the Women's Christian Temperance Union), that it was a diversion from more important struggles, and that suffrage would ultimately not make a difference. She also said that activists ought to advocate revolution rather than seek greater privileges within an inherently unjust system. Anti-suffragists saw women's efforts to gain the vote to be all surface dressing with a lack of serious intent to change the world for the better. Other Antis believed that social reform was better accomplished through trade unions and non-partisan groups. Progressives criticized suffrage in the Utah Territory as a cynical Mormon ploy, resulting in the passage of the Edmunds-Tucker Act.

Another argument employed by anti-suffragists related to the issue of the uninformed voter. This argument was grounded not so much in opposition to women's right to vote, but rather in the concern that their participation would exacerbate an already overtaxed ballot system. The steady rise in immigration between 1850 and 1880 made this rationale popular among middle-class voters, who suggested that these new voters were "illiterate, unfamiliar with democracy, or inclined to sell their votes for liquor or money."

Educational requirements were proposed to counter these concerns but became contentious with the ratification of the Fifteenth Amendment. Educated women voiced their resentment that less educated and frequently illiterate men should have the right to vote before themselves.

The anti-suffrage movement began to change in its position against suffrage in 1917, expanding their scope to include anti-radical rhetoric. The anti-suffrage movement focused less on the issue of suffrage and began to spread fear of radical ideas and to use "conspiratorial paranoia." Suffragists were accused of subversion of the government and treason. They were also accused of being socialists, "Bolsheviks" or "unpatriotic German sympathizers." The Texas branch of the NAOWS accused women's suffrage groups of being linked to "socialism, anarchy and Mormonism." Accusations of being associated with unpopular radical movements was named after the second president of NAOWS, Alice Wadsworth, and called "Wadsworthy" attacks. In addition to associating suffrage with radicalism, the antis also felt that they were oppressed and had lost much perceived political power by 1917.

Anti-suffrage movements in the American South included an appeal to conservatism and white supremacy. In Virginia, the NAOWS chapter even linked race riots to women's suffrage.

=== Anti-suffragism after the nineteenth amendment ===
Once the nineteenth amendment was passed, some women who opposed suffrage exercised this right. They took the energy they were investing in the anti-suffrage movement and turned it towards supporting the platform of the Republican party. Former members of anti-suffrage groups in New York became involved in the Women's National Republican Club. In this way, they left the private sphere and entered the public sphere, one of the things that they were resisting in their anti-suffrage efforts. Former anti-suffragist, Ida Tarbell, pointed out that it would take some time for women to get comfortable with voting. Some women didn't vote or get involved in politics. Others, like Annie Nathan Meyer advocated for all anti-suffrage women to not vote in order to allow the country to suffer from what she saw as a terrible decision to allow women to vote.

The passage of the Nineteenth Amendment also kickstarted a coalition of anti-suffragists who organized themselves into a political anti-feminist movement in order to "oppose expansion of social welfare programs, women's peace efforts, and to foster a political culture hostile to progressive female activists. This coalition effectively blended anti-feminism and anti-radicalism by embracing and utilizing the hysteria of the post-World War I Red Scare."

==== Modern era ====
In the 2020s, many American far-right figures began to call for the repeal of the Nineteenth Amendment, often connected with the Christian nationalist movement. This viewpoint came to more attention in August 2025, when U.S. Secretary of Defense Pete Hegseth reposted a video on Twitter featuring Doug Wilson, pastor of Christ Church in Moscow, Idaho, in which video participants discussed repealing the Nineteenth Amendment. In response, Hegseth's press secretary clarified that he supports women's suffrage. Hegseth's pastor, however, along with other senior figures in the Communion of Reformed Evangelical Churches, advocate repealing the Nineteenth Amendment in favor of "household voting," where households would receive a singular vote and the husband would get the final say in the event of disagreement.

Other notable political figures connected with this view include Paul Ingrassia, who appeared to endorse this viewpoint in a 2023 podcast interview, Paul Ray Ramsey, Dale Partridge, John Gibbs, and Andrew Tate. Anti-abortion advocate Abby Johnson has advocated replacing the current voting system with one of household voting.

In 2022, American political commentator and a far-right white nationalist, activist, Nick Fuentes told the British journalist Louis Theroux that he believes it would be better if women did not have the right to vote. In November 2025, Fuentes said that if he was elected president, he would “just take away the right to vote for tons of people. Women for sure.”

== Criticism ==
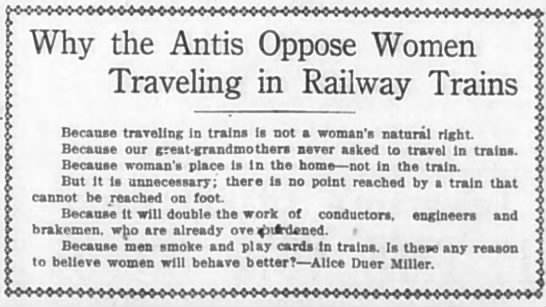
Alice Duer Miller's satire of Anti-Suffrage arguments from The Daily Telegram in 1916

There was contemporary criticism of the anti-suffrage movement in the United States. One criticism was that anti-suffragists did not present a consistent argument against suffrage. Other arguments were seen as inconsistent, such as Antis claiming that voting meant women must hold office, when members of anti-suffrage groups were already holding offices such as being on the school board. Other critics, such as Alice Stone Blackwell, pointed out that the anti-suffrage groups exaggerated certain claims, such as membership numbers. Critics also argued that there were no new arguments presented over time. Anti-suffrage groups were also criticized for being "inconsistent" in that they wanted women out of the public sphere, yet they gathered together into public lobbying groups against suffrage. The Valley Independent wrote in 1915 that any organization that wanted to oppose women's suffrage and which was made up of women "leaves a bad taste in our mouth."

Some critics were "almost contemptuous," such as Anna Howard Shaw, who said, "You'd think they would have loyalty enough to their sex not to make us all out a set of fools." Shaw believed that Antis were "puppets of more power male forces." Florence Kelley called anti-suffragists "lazy, comfortable, sheltered creatures, caring nothing for the miseries of the poor."

== Archives ==
The archives of the Women's National Anti-Suffrage League are held at The Women's Library at the Library of the London School of Economics, ref 2WNA.

The Library and Archives division of the Georgia Historical Society have a collection of broadsides from the National Association Opposed to Woman Suffrage from 1917 to 1919. The documents appear to be printed by state affiliates of the national group. One of the documents was issued by The Men's Anti-Ratification League of Montgomery, Alabama.

== Notable people ==
- Catharine Beecher
- Hilaire Belloc
- G. K. Chesterton
- Gertrude Bell
- Emily Bissell
- Minnie Bronson
- Beatrice Chamberlain
- Cola Barr Craig
- Madeleine Vinton Dahlgren
- Josephine Jewell Dodge
- Jeannette Leonard Gilder
- Emma Goldman
- Gertrud Haldimann
- Annie Riley Hale
- Sarah Josepha Hale
- Ethel Bertha Harrison (known as. Mrs. Frederic Harrison)
- Mary Hilliard Hinton
- Mary, Countess of Ilchester
- Helen Kendrick Johnson
- Lillian Bayard Taylor Kiliani
- Adeline Knapp
- Margaret Elizabeth Leigh
- Eliza Lynn Linton
- Miss Lonsdale
- Violet Markham
- Florence Percy McIntyre
- Charlotte Elizabeth McKay
- Annie Nathan Meyer
- Duchess of Montrose
- Jane Marsh Parker
- Gladys Pott
- Sir James Reid, 1st Baronet
- Molly Elliot Seawell
- Herbert Spencer
- Sallie Lewis Stephens Sturgeon
- Ida Tarbell
- Alice Hay Wadsworth
- Mary Augusta Ward

== See also ==
- Antifeminism
- List of anti-suffragists
- Timeline of women's suffrage
- Who Needs Feminism
- Women Against Feminism
- Women's suffrage
