= Caroline Fairfield Corbin =

American writer and anti-suffragist (1835–1918)

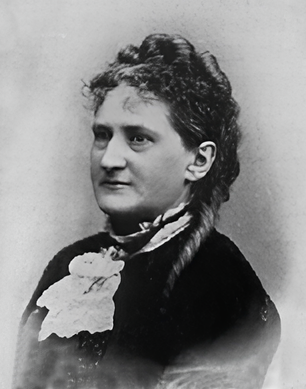
- Born: Caroline Elizabeth Fairfield; November 9, 1835; Pomfret, Connecticut
- Died: March 27, 1918 (aged 82); Petoskey, Michigan
- Occupations: Author, Anti-suffragist activist
- Spouse: Calvin Rich Corbin
- Children: Franklin Nichols Corbin, Grace Corbin, Caroline (Dana) F. Corbin, John Corbin, Laurance Paul Corbin
- Parent(s): Jason William Fairfield and Hannah Dana (Chandler) Fairfield

Caroline Fairfield Corbin (born Caroline Fairfield; November 9, 1835 – March 27, 1918) was an American author, social reformer, and anti-suffragist from Illinois. She is best known for her opposition to women's suffrage and her writings on social issues. Her known literary works include Rebecca, or Woman's Secret, The Marriage Vow, and others. Corbin founded the Illinois Association Opposed to the Extension of Suffrage to Women.

== Early life and education ==
Caroline Fairfield was born on November 9, 1835, to Jason William Fairfield and Hannah Dana (Chandler) in Pomfret, Connecticut. She came from a well-known, upper-class New England family and was raised as a Trinitarian Christian.

=== Education ===
Corbin received her education at the Brooklyn Female Academy (later renamed Packer Collegiate Institute) in Brooklyn, New York, graduating in 1852. She studied everything from trigonometry to theology, and her interests settled on writing.

== Lineage ==
She is a charter member (Number 343) of the Daughters of the American Revolution and traced her ancestry to passengers on the Mayflower.

Corbin is a descendant of Solomon Cleveland, a notable figure from Connecticut. Her lineage includes her grandparents, Charles Chandler and Hannah Cleveland. She is the great-granddaughter of Solomon Cleveland, who served as a captain of a company in the Battle of Long Island.

Solomon Cleveland, born September 17, 1756, in Farmington, Connecticut, and died September 27, 1836, in Spafford Hollow, served in the American Revolutionary War. He married Esther Knight from Norwich, Connecticut, in Bennington, Vermont. Cleveland enlisted in March 1776 in Captain Samuel Sloan’s Company and later served in Captain Lemuel Hyde’s Company. He acquired land in Bennington in 1786 and lived there until at least 1790.

== Career and activism ==
After graduating, Corbin spent two years working as a teacher in Sewickley, Pennsylvania. During a visit to family in Alton, Illinois, she met Calvin Rich Corbin, a merchant's agent. They married in 1861, and by 1862, they had their first child. Corbin primarily engaged with the broader public through her roles as a wife and mother. She later moved to Chicago, Illinois, where she would spend most of her life.

=== Disillusionment with the suffrage movement ===
In 1862, Corbin published her first novel, Rebecca, or a Woman's Secret, which she dedicated to John Stuart Mill for his "noble efforts in behalf of the Enfranchisement of Women." Initially, Corbin was an advocate for women's suffrage and was among the first members of the Evanston, Illinois Woman's Christian Temperance Union (WCTU). However, her views on suffrage changed dramatically after meeting Eleanor Marx, daughter of Karl Marx, in 1886. This encounter, coupled with her deep exploration of socialism, led Corbin to become a staunch opponent of women's suffrage.

In letters to Frances Willard in 1888 and 1889, Corbin reflected on her evolving perspective:

Twenty years ago I was tolerant of woman suffrage because I felt the need for something to open a wider door for women and elevate them to a better understanding of their own powers and worth.

Her perspective shifted when she recognized that:

...false ideals were luring women away from the natural and sacred duties of the home, fostering a coarse and selfish individualism.

Corbin believed that the suffrage movement was grounded in a "low materialistic" view of women's worth. She felt that focusing on women's right to vote reduced their value to mere political and economic terms, neglecting what she saw as their deeper, intrinsic contributions to society in areas like morality, family life, and spiritual guidance. Corbin argued that these non-material aspects were more central to women's true significance.

Historian Catherine Cole Mambretti argues that the Corbin "might have called themselves feminists had the term not been associated with suffragists." Corbin, like many of the suffrage leaders had been well educated and heavily involved in women's organizations, like the Association for the Advancement of Women, another organization she founded. She thought that women should carry their political clout through social reform and education rather than through the vote.

=== Anti-suffrage activism ===
In 1897, Corbin founded the Illinois Association Opposed to the Extension of Suffrage to Women (IAOESW). She remained president of the IAOESW throughout its seventeen-year existence. She believed that granting women the right to vote would lead to the destruction of traditional family values and societal order. Corbin was particularly concerned about the potential spread of socialism and communism in the United States through women's suffrage. Some of Corbin's anti-suffrage efforts included:

- Publishing pamphlets and newspaper articles opposing women's suffrage
- Writing letters to the Illinois State Senate and House of Representatives against suffrage bills
- Sending editorial letters to the Chicago Tribune in response to pro-suffrage articles
- Campaigning against suffrage efforts in both Illinois and Germany

Corbin's Letters from a Chimney-Corner argued that women's domestic roles were tied to "home rule"—the idea that women’s involvement in managing the household was equivalent to governing the home.

Corbin’s perspective on the suffrage movement evolved significantly over time. Initially supportive, she began to view suffrage as a threat rather than a means of empowerment. In her view, the movement endangered "the foundation of what is highest and purest" in society. She believed that being a woman did not imply inferiority to men but signified a different role.

Corbin adopted arguments similar to those of the Remonstrants, who advocated for preserving certain legal protections for women. This viewpoint was a core argument for antisuffragists and later echoed by opponents of the Equal Rights Amendment. They contended that to "confound and 'equalize' these functions would be to undermine and subvert the whole order of society and introduce anarchy." Corbin feared that if men and women were treated as equals in voting, it would extend into other domains, forcing women to adopt traits perceived as "mannish."

Contrary to the perception of antisuffragists as self-derogatory, Corbin and others saw themselves as pro-woman. They viewed suffrage as a threat to the special, mythic quality of womanhood. The concepts of "feminism" and "equality" were seen as undermining the unique value of women. They worried that pushing for equality would erode femininity. Historian Catherine Cole Mambretti notes that antisuffragists emphasized women's role as civilizers, contrasting it with the negative view of men and worrying about the potential for societal chaos.

Antisuffragists also feared that suffrage would lead to domestic instability. An Antisuffrage Bulletin expressed concerns that suffragists' tactics, characterized by noise and spectacle, aligned more with "decadence and misrule" than with "good sense and sound government." They questioned the impact of women voting and holding office on marriage and family life, believing that it would result in a neglect of the domestic responsibilities crucial for raising well-educated children.

Corbin’s arguments were distinctive among antisuffragists. She fervently argued that suffrage was not only a tenet of socialism but also a fundamental principle essential to socialism's success. She claimed that while not every suffragist was a socialist, every socialist was necessarily a suffragist. Corbin saw socialism as striving for a classless society, where eliminating suffrage limitations was a key step. She feared that socialism would "de-sex" women, undermining societal standards in favor of individualism. According to Corbin, the Republic was founded on the family as the core unit of society, whereas socialism focused on the individual, disregarding the significance of childbirth.

Although Corbin’s pamphlets may seem like desperate attempts to prevent women's suffrage, her concerns about a suffrage-socialism alliance had some basis. Many socialist leaders, including Frances Willard, supported suffrage. Lena Morrow Lewis, a journalist and socialist, wrote in 1911 that suffrage was crucial for justice and future comradeship. In Illinois, socialists had allied with suffragists since the 1880s, working together with the Working Women's Union and the Knights of Labor.

Despite the robust antisuffrage sentiment, the suffrage movement made substantial progress. Women achieved numerous legislative victories, including property rights dissolution, entry into the Bar Association, the ability to hold office, an increase in the age of consent from 10 to 14, the passage of a Child Labor Law, and the election of the first female Board of Trustees member at the University of Illinois.

== Personal life ==
Corbin and her husband had five children, all born in Chicago: Franklin Nichols, Grace, Caroline (Dana) F, John, and Laurance Paul. From 1870 to 1873, the family lived in Evanston, before returning to Chicago. Her son John Corbin (May 2, 1870 – August 30, 1959) became well known dramatic critic and author.

She was a member of the New England Congregational Church in Aurora, Illinois.

Corbin was a member of the Illinois Woman's Exposition Board for her works Letters from a Chimney Corner; His Marriage Vow; Our Bible Class; Rebecca, or a Woman's Secret; Belle and the Boys; A Woman's Philosophy of Love.

== Death and legacy ==
Corbin died on March 27, 1918, in Petoskey, Michigan, just two years before the passage of the 19th Amendment, which granted women the right to vote. Despite her efforts, the women's suffrage movement ultimately succeeded in achieving its goal. Corbin's work represents a significant voice in the anti-suffrage movement of the late 19th and early 20th centuries.

== Books ==
Corbin was a prolific writer, authoring several books and pamphlets on social reform. Her most notable works include:

- His Marriage Vow (Boston: Lee and Shepard, Publishers; New York: Lee, Shepard, and Dillingham, 1874) - The book about how faith and spirituality intersect with social issues. The story features Chester Elms, who deals with spiritual practices like séances and fortune-telling. Corbin explores how traditional religious beliefs can coexist with new ideas, showing the struggles women faced between pursuing their goals and fitting into society's expectations.
- One Woman's Experience of Emancipation (Chicago: Illinois Association Opposed to the Extension of Suffrage to Women, 1904) - Corbin's changed views after encountering socialist ideas. The book examines Corbin’s critique of feminist and suffrage movements from an anti-suffragist perspective. Influenced by Edward Aveling and Eleanor Marx, who discussed socialism’s effects on marriage and women's roles, Corbin responds by arguing that political emancipation for women conflicts with traditional values and societal norms.
- Woman Under Socialism (Chicago: Truth Society, April 1903) - Corbin critiques socialism by arguing that its promises of industrial and political emancipation for women are often vague and fail to address the complexities of real-world application. She points out a discrepancy between the idealistic goals of socialism and its actual impact, suggesting that the benefits proclaimed by socialist leaders may not be as substantial or just as claimed. Additionally, Corbin critiques the romanticized view of socialism, noting that the movement's historical context and origins in social grievances do not necessarily translate into effective solutions for social issues.
- Rebecca; or, A Woman's Secret (Chicago: Jansen, McClurg & Co., 1877) - The narrative follows Dr. Rebecca and offers insights into leading a principled life. It examines contemporary views on gender roles and the status of women.
- The Position of Women in the Socialistic Utopia (Chicago: American Association Opposed to Socialism, 1902) - Corbin included strong accusations linking women’s suffrage to socialism.
- Equality (Chicago: Illinois Association Opposed to Woman Suffrage, 1910) - The pamphlet questions whether women's suffrage truly achieves equality, arguing that it does not significantly improve women's capabilities or influence. It suggests that despite some early successes, women's roles in politics remain limited and that true equality involves recognizing inherent differences between sexes rather than imposing uniformity.
