= Margaret Lonsdale =

- Born: 28 November 1846; Lichfield, Staffordshire, England
- Died: 10 January 1917 (aged 70); Hyde Park, London, England
- Occupations: Nurse and writer
- Known for: Biographer and philanthropist

Lucy Margaret Lonsdale (28 November 1846 – 10 January 1917) was a British writer, biographer, and nurse.

== Life ==
Lonsdale was born in Cathedral Close, Lichfield, in 1846. Her grandfather, John Lonsdale, was bishop of Lichfield and her father was canon of the cathedral. She took to writing and joined Charlotte Yonge's Gosling Society where she could use her home education to help her write essays to share with society. She took the nom de plume of Magpie and, like all the members of the society, tried to write two essays each week, with the best circulated to the membership.

In 1869, the family governess was ill and their father wrote to the Christ Church sisterhood at Coatham, led by Sister Dora. Sister Dora came in person and cared for the children, making a life-changing impression on Lonsdale. Sister Dora returned to Walsall after three weeks, but Lonsdale would visit the sisters and work as a "Lady Pupil" until 1880. In 1877, she went to study further as a nurse at King’s College Hospital for three months.

Biography about Sister Dora writted by Margared Lonsdale

In 1880, she attracted the attention of Florence Nightingale, who had become embroiled in a piece Lonsdale had written concerning Guy's Hospital. Nightingale was unimpressed by her biography of Sister Dora because it showed a poor understanding of nursing procedures.

Sister Dora died of breast cancer on Christmas Eve 1878. Within a year, Lonsdale had researched how Sister Dora has arrived in Walsall as a nurse, and by 1868, was the sister-in-charge. She gathered this together into a book about Sister Dora's life, which became very successful. Sister Dora: A Biography was published in different countries and was still in print in 1914.

Lonsdale then wrote a polemic against famous women leaders, especially those who chose to put themselves on a "platform" to push their particular agendas. She decried the recent "tendency amongst women" in England and the U.S. toward public speaking. Clippings from her essay were reprinted in newspapers throughout the British empire, as far away as New Zealand.

Lonsdale died in Hyde Park.
