= National Association Opposed to Woman Suffrage =

Former US political organization

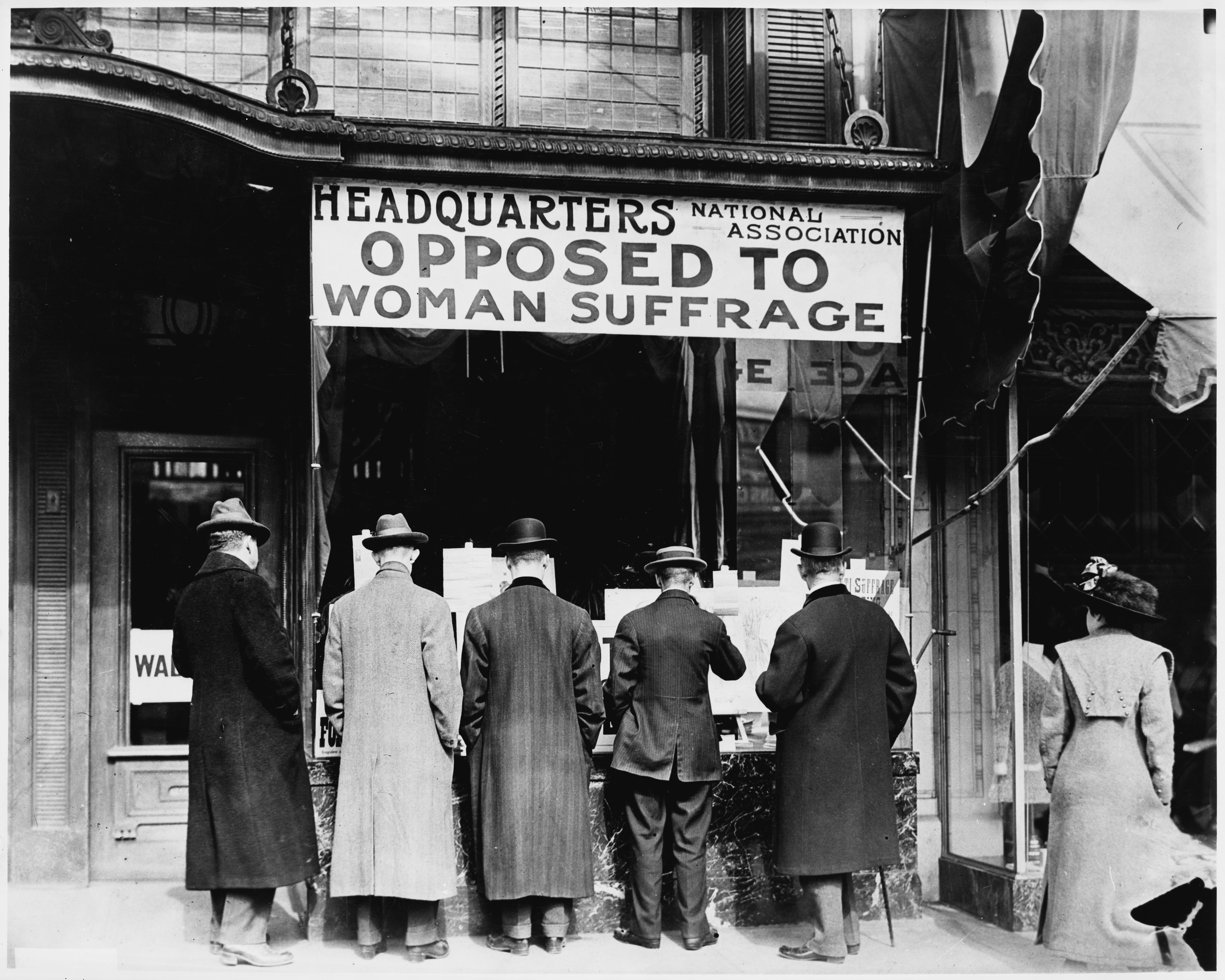
Headquarters of the National Association Opposed to Woman Suffrage in New York City

The National Association Opposed to Woman Suffrage (NAOWS) was founded in the United States by women opposed to the suffrage movement in 1911. It was the most popular anti-suffrage organization in northeastern cities. NAOWS had influential local chapters in many states, including Texas and Virginia.

== History ==
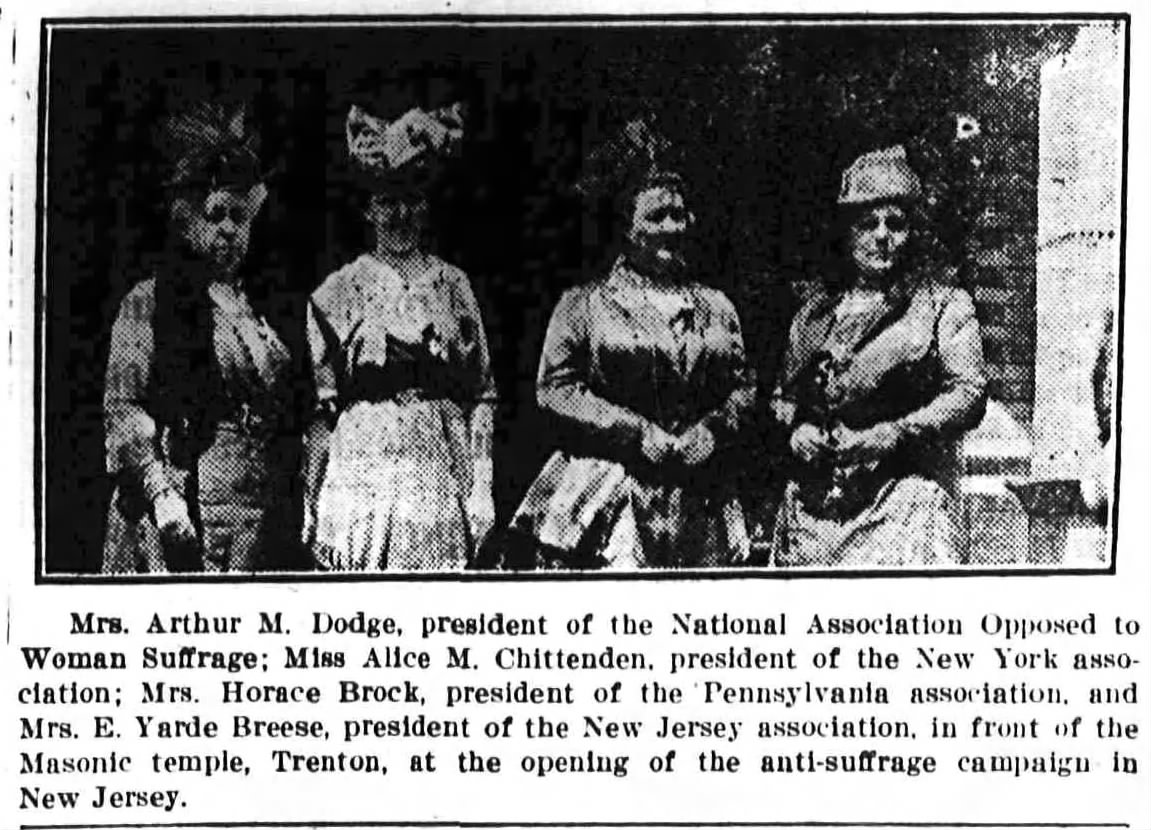
Mrs. Arthur M. Dodge, Miss Alice M. Chittenden, Mrs. Horace Brock, Mrs. E. Yarde Breese, start the anti-suffrage campaign in New Jersey in May 1915

The National Association Opposed to Woman Suffrage (NAOWS) was established by Josephine Jewell Dodge in New York City in 1911. Dodge had the first meeting at her house and women came from New York and surrounding states. Dodge was currently the president of the New York State Association Opposed to Woman Suffrage (NYSAOWS). Dodge resigned from NYSAOWS to take over as president of NAOWS. Shortly after formation, state branches of NAOWS began to form. Headquarters in Washington, D.C., were opened in 1913, giving the organization a front in both New York and the U.S. Capital.

Like other anti-suffrage organizations, NAOWS published a newsletter as well as other publications, containing their opinions on the current political issues of the time. The newsletter of the association was called Woman's Protest (later renamed Woman Patriot in 1918). Dodge also toured the country, spreading anti-suffrage views to other states.

Josephine Dodge, the founding president, was replaced in 1917, by Alice Hay Wadsworth, wife of U.S. Senator James W. Wadsworth, Jr. from New York. Upon amendment to the New York State Constitution granting women the right to vote, the focus of the NAOWS shifted from the state level to the federal level. The organization also began to see more men join NAOWS than before. The headquarters were moved solely to Washington D.C. and they merged with the Woman Patriot Publishing Company. The organization disbanded in 1920 as a result of the passage of the Nineteenth Amendment.

=== Delaware Association Opposed to Woman Suffrage ===
The Delaware Association Opposed to Woman Suffrage (DAOWS) was formed in 1914. Mary Wilson Thompson served as the president. Thompson's influence on politics was effective at preventing the initial ratification of the Nineteenth Amendment in Delaware.

=== Georgia Association Opposed to Woman Suffrage ===
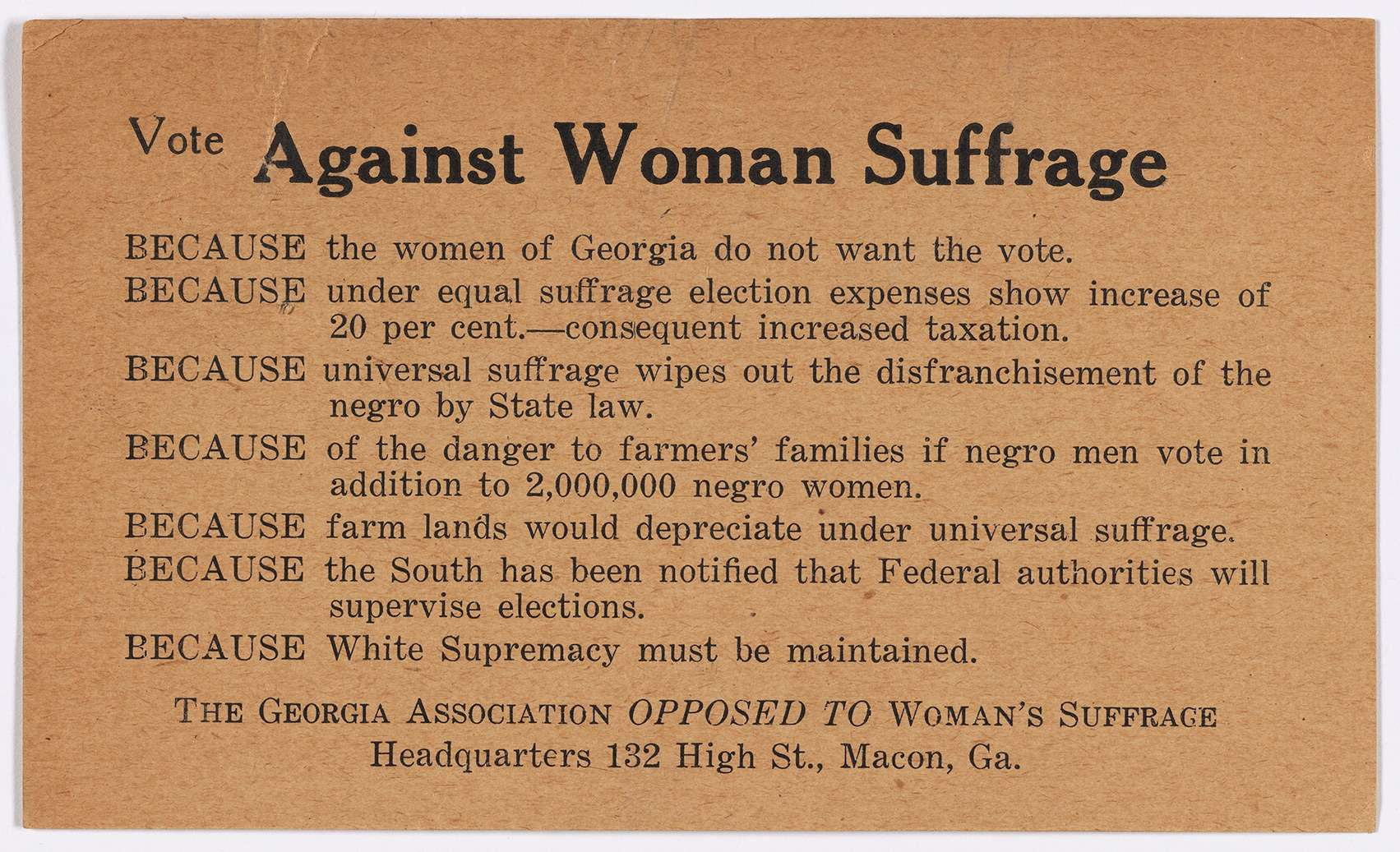
Vote Against Woman Suffrage - Georgia Association Opposed to Woman Suffrage, c. 1915

Prominent Georgia women, Dolly Blount Lamar and Mildred Rutherford, formed the Georgia Association Opposed to Woman Suffrage (GAOWS) in Macon, Georgia in May 1914. GAOWS was affiliated with the national group. Both Lamar and Rutherford were involved in Confederate memorial work. Rutherford's influence with the Confederate daughters of Georgia helped raise the profile of GAOWS and the group quickly grew to 2,000 members. For women who supported the idea of the Lost Cause, suffragists represented a change to traditional class and gender roles in the South. Anti-suffragists in Georgia linked women's suffrage to the Reconstruction era. They were also concerned with keeping power out of the hands of African-American women who were seeking equal rights. GAOWS was also concerned with keeping political power out of the hands of poor white women.

Members of GAOWS testified in front of the Georgia General Assembly against women's suffrage. After Georgia rejected the Nineteenth Amendment, Lamar went to other states to campaign against the amendment's ratification.

=== Maine Association Opposed to Suffrage for Women ===
The Maine Association Opposed to Suffrage for Women (MAOSW) was formed in 1913. By 1917, almost 2,000 members joined the group.

=== New Jersey Association Opposed to Woman Suffrage ===
The New Jersey Association Opposed to Woman Suffrage (NJAOWS) was formed on April 14, 1912. Many members of NJAOWS were wealthy and involved in "patriotic, heritage organizations" like the Daughters of the American Revolution (DAR). Anti-suffragists in New Jersey linked women's suffrage with anti-patriotism. Many did not want to see traditional roles in the community change. Members of NJAOWS were also worried about socialism and immigrants voting.

=== South Dakota Association Opposed to Woman Suffrage ===
In 1916, a South Dakota affiliate of NAOWS was created and led by Mrs. Ernest Jackson and Mrs. C. M. Hollister. The group started publishing a newspaper called the South Dakota Anti-Suffragist and campaigned against upcoming suffrage referendums in the state.

=== Texas Association Opposed to Woman Suffrage ===
In March 1916, the Texas Association Opposed to Woman Suffrage (TAOWS) was created as a chapter of NAOWS in Houston with Pauline Wells as the president. The chapter in Texas also connected the increase in African Americans voting to women's suffrage and they stoked fears of "domination by the black race in the South." They also believed that women's suffrage was linked to "feminism, sex antagonism, socialism, anarchy and Mormonism." Like their parent organization, TAOWS had local chapters in major Texas cities. TAOWS fought against the Texas Equal Suffrage Association who were pushing for Texas women's right to vote in Texas primary elections in 1918. In April 1919, headquarters were moved to Fort Worth. In 1919, TAOWS successfully campaigned against a state measure for women's vote which was defeated by 25,000 votes in May. However, in June 1919, Texas passed a suffrage amendment, allowing women to vote and the TAOWS stopped fighting against women's suffrage.

=== Virginia Association Opposed to Woman Suffrage ===
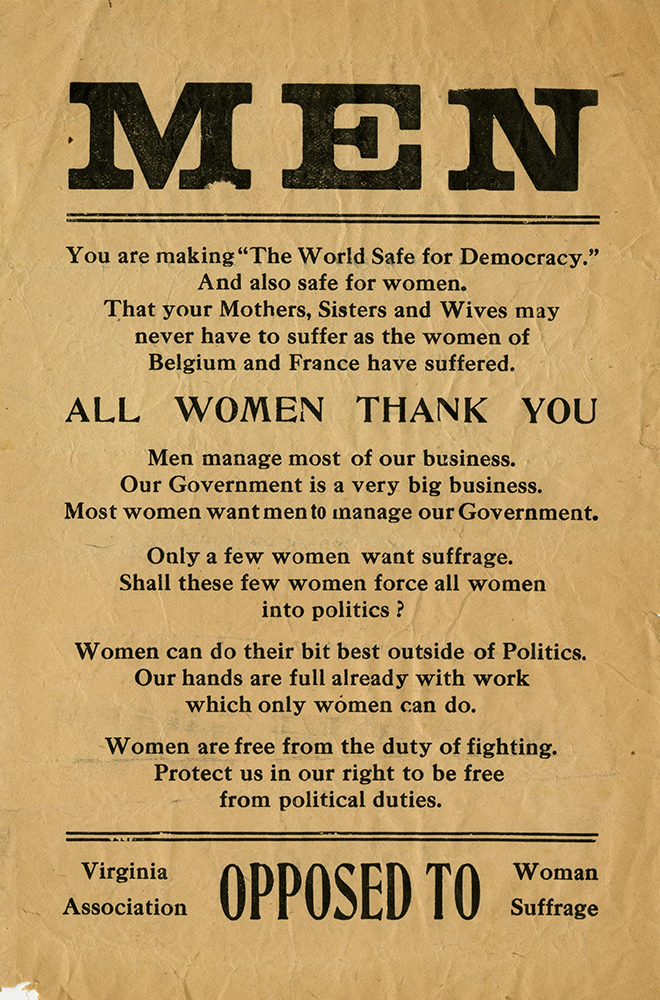
Virginia Association Opposed to Woman Suffrage broadside, 1917

A group, the Virginia Association Opposed to Woman Suffrage (VAOWS) formed in Richmond in March 1912 and affiliated with NAOWS. Jane Rutherford served as the president of VAOWS. Local branches in different cities formed by 1913 and the organization distributed anti-suffrage literature. In 1915, VAOWS helped raise money for the Belgian Relief Fund during World War I. By May 1917, VAOWS had doubled in size and continued to grow through 1918. Around 8,000 women had signed up with the anti-suffrage cause in Richmond by 1919.

Like the Texas Association Opposed to Woman Suffrage, VAOWS also suggested that race riots, the black vote and women's suffrage were connected. In a sponsored editorial published in The Richmond Times-Dispatch on September 2, 1919, VAOWS exclaimed, "Race riots will increase if there is more politics between the races and if women are mixed up in politics!" One anti-suffragist in Virginia said it would be harder to keep Black women from the polls than Black men saying that Black women were "exempt from fear and physical consequences."

VAOWS also threatened that if women were given the vote, it would lead to socialism. Linking socialism to women's suffrage brought class issues into the debate on the vote for women. Virginia had already worked to disenfranchise Black voters, poor white voters, and Republicans in 1902. VAOWS worked to make sure that this supremacy over the poor and over differing political ideologies was maintained. VAOWS appealed to states' rights as a means to oppose federal oversight of their voting practices.

== Political views ==
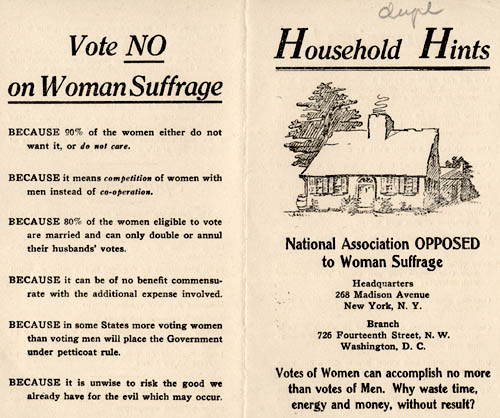
Household hints pamphlet distributed by the National Association Opposed to Woman Suffrage (NAOWS). circa 1910

One of NAOWS' publications included a pamphlet, Some Reasons Why We Oppose Votes for Women, which, as the title suggests, outlines some of the reasons why they are opposed to women suffrage. They believed it was irrelevant to the success of the country, as stated in their pamphlet:

Because the great advance of women in the last century—moral, intellectual and economic—has been made without the vote; which goes to prove that it is not needed for their further advancement along the same lines.

The National Association Opposed to Women Suffrage opposed women's right to vote because they said that the majority of women did not want the right to vote, and because they believed that the men in their lives accurately represented the political will of women around the United States. NAOWS submitted pamphlets like these to the general public as well as directing them to government officials so that political figures would see that women opposed the then-unratified nineteenth amendment. They did this in order to counteract the rhetoric of the suffragettes of the time. According to the NAOWS and the state-based organizations that it inspired, voting would severely and negatively affect the true submissive and domestic state of the feminine. These organizations were championed by women who thought themselves the prime examples of true womanhood—quiet, dignified, and regal. They looked with disdain at the outward protests of suffragettes.

NAOWS wanted to appeal to conservative and traditional members of their community, including other women and religious figures. They positioned themselves as being in opposition of "the militant suffragette" and militant or "hysterical" tactics. NAOWS also believed that women's involvement in politics would interfere with their "civic duties for which they are peculiarly adapted." NAOWS believed that women were equal to men, but had different duties and "functions".

=== Quotes from Some Reasons Why We Oppose Votes For Women ===
"We believe that political equality will deprive us of special privileges hitherto accorded to us by law."

"[We oppose suffrage] Because it means simply doubling the vote, and especially the undesirable and corrupt vote of our large cities."

"[We oppose suffrage] Because our present duties fill up the whole measure of our time and ability, and are such as none but ourselves can perform."

== Notable members ==
- Josephine Jewell Dodge
- Ida Tarbell
- Alice Hay Wadsworth
- Kate Douglas Wiggin
- Minnie Bronson
