= Josephine Jewell Dodge =

American childcare reformer and anti-suffrage leader (1855–1928)

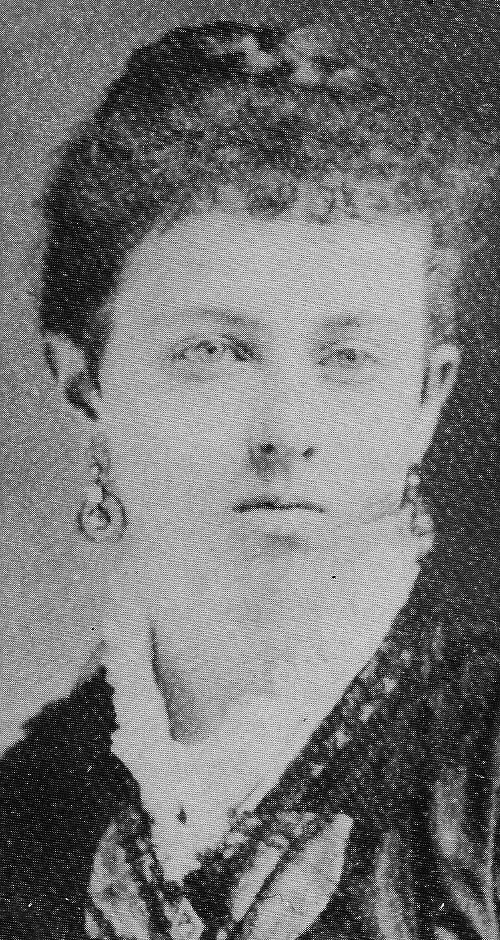
- Dodge, c. 1915
- Born: Josephine Marshall Jewell; February 11, 1855; Hartford, Connecticut, U.S.
- Died: March 6, 1928 (aged 73); Cannes, France
- Resting place: Weatogue Cemetery, Simsbury, Connecticut, U.S.
- Education: Vassar College (attended 1872–1873; no degree)
- Occupations: Childcare reformer; Day nursery pioneer; Anti-suffrage activist
- Years active: 1888–1918
- Known for: Founder, Jewell Day Nursery (1888); Founding president, National Association Opposed to Woman Suffrage (1911–1917)
- Spouse: Arthur Murray Dodge (m. 1875; died 1894)
- Children: 8 (5 sons surviving)
- Parents: Marshall Jewell (father); Mary Frances Gillette (mother)

Josephine Marshall Jewell Dodge (born February 11, 1855 – March 6, 1928) was an American childcare reformer and leading anti-suffrage activist. She founded New York City's Jewell Day Nursery in 1888, showcased it at the 1893 World's Columbian Exposition, and helped create both city and national federations of day nurseries. From 1911 to 1917 she served as founding president of the National Association Opposed to Woman Suffrage and edited its newspaper, The Woman's Protest. The Hartford-born daughter of Connecticut governor Marshall Jewell, she married copper heir Arthur Murray Dodge, was widowed in 1894, and died in Cannes, France; her 1867–68 letters from Saint Petersburg are held by Vassar College.

== Early life ==
Born as Josephine Marshall Jewell in Hartford, Connecticut on February 11, 1855. She was the eldest child of Marshall Jewell, who later served as the Governor of Connecticut (1869–1873) and United States Postmaster General (1874–1876), among other government posts. Jewell withdrew from Vassar College without a degree in 1873 to accompany her father to Saint Petersburg, Russia, when he was serving as a diplomat there.

Jewell married Arthur Murray Dodge in 1875; he was the son of William E. Dodge, a well-known copper merchant, Congressman, and philanthropist associated with Phelps Dodge Company. The couple had eight children, six sons and two daughters. Both daughters died in infancy, and one son, Pliny, died in 1889 at the age of five; their sons were Marshall, Murray, A. Douglas, Geoffrey, and Percival.

== Jewell Day Nursery ==
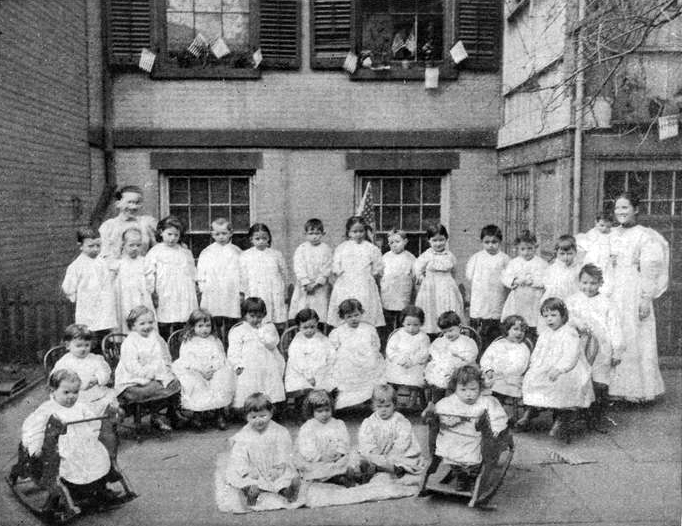
Children and members of Jewell Day Nursery, New York City

Dodge sponsored the Virginia Day Nursery in New York City, a facility intended to provide child care to working mothers on the Lower East Side. Her program developed in 1888 to become the Jewell Day Nursery, which had a greater educational component. Dodge demonstrated her methods at the Columbian Exposition in 1893, and in 1895, she was founder and first president of the Association of Day Nurseries of New York City in 1895, and was part of the National Federation of Day Nurseries in 1898.

== Anti-suffrage activism ==
In 1911, she helped found and became president of the National Association Opposed to Woman Suffrage, a post she held for six years; she also edited the organization's publication, Woman's Protest. She was the target of a verbal attack at a 1915 "riot" between suffrage and anti-suffrage activists in Washington DC.

That same year, speaking in New Jersey, Dodge argued that most women lacked the practical experience necessary for sound governance, stating, “She is worthily employed in other departments of life, and the vote will not help her fulfill her obligations therein.” She also denied claims that anti-suffrage groups were funded by liquor interests seeking to block Prohibition.

Some historians assume that anti-suffragists had a conservative social agenda, their motivation was actually often different. Dodge and others were of the perspective that there is danger in adding to the number of politically uninformed voters, which was already seen as a problem. She also believed that if women became involved in the world of partisan politics, they would lose some of their moral authority.

== Death and legacy ==
Dodge died in Cannes, France, on March 6, 1928, and was interred beside her husband in the Dodge family plot at Weatogue Cemetery in Simsbury, Connecticut. A substantial collection of her letters from the Jewell family's 1867–1868 residence in Saint Petersburg is preserved in Vassar College's Archives & Special Collections Library, while her nieces by marriage included philanthropist Grace Hoadley Dodge and pro-suffrage society hostess Mary Melissa Hoadley Dodge, daughters of William E. Dodge Jr.

== See also ==
- List of anti-suffragists
