= List of anti-suffragists =

People who opposed women's suffrage

The List of anti-suffragists is an alphabetical list of individuals and organizations that publicly opposed extending voting rights to women. Entries are organised by country and cover politicians, writers, religious leaders and social reformers active throughout the 19th and 20th centuries. Opponents argued that women's suffrage would disrupt traditional gender roles, undermine societal stability or weaken national institutions. Opposition spanned the political spectrum and included both men and women, some of whom believed that women's influence belonged in domestic or philanthropic spheres while others claimed that women's suffrage would hasten socialism or secularism. Entries include notable individuals who campaigned through speeches, publications, parliamentary motions or membership of anti-suffrage organisations.

== Europe ==
=== Austria ===
Name	Lifespan	Occupation	Opposition to women's suffrage
Victor Adler	1852–1918	Physician, founder-leader of the Social Democratic Workers' Party	In 1903 he told the party's women's section that the fight for the male franchise must come first and that women "had to take a back seat," leading the movement to drop its suffrage demand until after 1907.
Karl Lueger	1844–1910	Mayor of Vienna and head of the Christian Social Party	Lueger, leader of Vienna's Christian Social Party (CSP), was known for both his antisemitism and his opposition to women's suffrage. Argued suffrage would benefit only Jewish women and undermine Christian and "Aryan" dominance.
Franz Martin Schindler	1848–1917	Catholic theologian; CSP social theorist	Schindler, in particular, held the belief that women were destined to fulfill their duties in life solely within the home, based on their "natural lack of physical force, depth and composure in judgment, determination in will, and perseverance in action." He argued that these perceived deficiencies made politics unsuitable for women and upheld a gender dualism that confined women to the spheres of home and charity.
Georg Ritter von Schönerer	1842–1921	Pan-German nationalist deputy	Dismissed female suffrage as "idiocy," claiming it was demanded only by women "who had failed in their calling as women" and by "Jewesses."

=== Belgium ===
Name	Lifespan	Occupation	Opposition to women's suffrage
Charles Woeste	1837–1922	Politician, consul for Prussia	According to The Brussels Times, Woeste "fought fiercely in parliament to prevent Belgian women from gaining the vote." However, in a 5 March 1902 speech in the Chamber of Representatives, Woeste declared that before granting "pure and simple suffrage exclusively to men," (p. 268) and the Catholic right would "make women's suffrage triumph," suggesting he viewed women's suffrage as a political tactic to counter the expansion of universal male suffrage favored by socialists.

=== Denmark ===
Name	Lifespan	Occupation	Opposition to women's suffrage
Carl Ploug	1813–1894	Poet, editor and politician	Ploug called the 1888 bill on municipal suffrage for women a "link in a chain" toward "political equality of women with men" and urged the Landsting to "stop at the first step." He insisted women were "not particularly suited for legislative work," that "ordinary women as a whole really do not want to be able to vote," and that society would suffer if they were "drawn away from the acts of love that lie before them to quarrel ... in a parliament."
Jacob Brønnum Scavenius Estrup	1825–1913	Politician, member of the Højre party	He retained a mistrust of universal suffrage and parliamentary rule by the Folketing. Højre party and Estrup supporters blocked women's participation in political life in the Rigsdag (Parliament). He held the view that his political engagement stemmed from a sense of duty toward the king and the fatherland.

=== Finland ===
Name	Lifespan	Occupation	Opposition to women's suffrage
Robert Hermanson	1846–1928	Professor of constitutional law, jurist, and politician	Hermanson played a central role in the 1906 Finnish suffrage struggle as the chair of the Parliamentary Reform Committee tasked in November 1905 with drafting the new suffrage rules. Despite his leadership position, Hermanson was a vocal opponent of women's suffrage. He believed that women were "by nature emotional creatures prone to extremism and ill-suited for politics and the vote," expressing clear resistance to their political inclusion.
Karl Heikel	1844–1921	Banker and politician	As a member of the 1905‑06 Parliamentary Reform (Hermanson) Committee he argued that only some women, "not the lower social orders", should be eligible for Parliament, pressing to restrict women's candidacy and keep full political rights from working-class women.

=== France ===
Name	Lifespan	Occupation	Opposition to women's suffrage
Edmond Lefebvre du Prey	1866–1955	Politician	Lefebvre du Prey represented Pas-de-Calais in the National Assembly from 1909 to 1927 and served in the Senate from 1927 to 1940. Lefebvre du Prey said granting the franchise would "undermine the family and give women direct control over public affairs." As vice-president of the inter-war Groupe parlementaire pour la protection de la natalité he stated in Senate debates that female voters would follow priests' orders and "imperil the Republic," and he helped send every suffrage bill (1919–36) back to committee where it died.
Pierre Marraud	1872–1958	Politician	In 1922 Marraud's committee report recommended indefinite postponement, arguing that "the woman of the Latin race," unlike her Anglo-Saxon or Germanic counterparts, had not developed the same civic sensibilities. Marraud claimed that French women were generally more absorbed in their Church, whose dogmatism they did not question, and therefore it was reasonable for their legal status to remain different from that of men.

=== Germany ===
Name	Lifespan	Occupation	Opposition to women's suffrage
Hans Delbrück	1848–1929	Historian and politician	Opposed women's suffrage, advocating for a "true and perfect state" as inherently masculine, viewing suffrage as a provocative expansion of political participation that threatened monarchical principles.
Ludwig Langemann	1854–1930	Anti-suffrage leader	Chairman of the German League for the Prevention of Women's Emancipation (Deutscher Bund zur Bekämpfung der Frauenemanzipation). According to Langemann, women's suffrage threatens "the most masculine people on earth"; must be prevented "in the holiest interest of humanity."
Paul Julius Möbius	1853–1907	Neurologist and writer	Authored On the Physiological Feeblemindedness of Women (1900), claiming women's intellectual inferiority to support anti-feminist arguments against women's suffrage.
Paula Müller-Otfried	1865–1946	Social reformer and anti-suffrage leader	Led the German Protestant Women's League (Deutsch-Evangelischer Frauenbund), which remained neutral but included anti-suffrage members. Müller-Otfried expressed concerns that women's suffrage could destabilize traditional familial and religious roles, describing political rights as a "two-edged sword."
Kuno von Westarp	1864–1945	Politician	Senior deputy of the German National People's Party (DNVP). Publicly demanded revocation of women's suffrage in November 1920, later admitting opposition despite its electoral benefits to the DNVP.

=== Greece ===
Name	Lifespan	Occupation	Opposition to women's suffrage
Marika Filippidou	b. 1877	Stage actress, poet, journalist	During the interwar period, Filippidou contributed a series of columns to the women's journal Ellínis in which she described politics as "a turbulent arena" that conflicted with women's nature of "calm and composure." She also stated that granting women the right to vote would pose a threat to Christian family values.
Pipina Vallosi	1850–1913	Journalist, essayist, and philanthropist	Vallosi argued that "the natural calling of woman is the quiet, restful, domestic life, not the ever‑moving, turbulent, public one". She asserted that "woman's natural field of activity is the household", repeating the maxim "Men make the laws, women make the morals". She argued that women's emotional nature rendered them unfit for political judgment.
Panagis Tsaldaris	1868–1936	Prime Minister of Greece (1932–35)	Tsaldaris emerged as the principal parliamentary obstacle to expanding women's rights beyond the limited municipal vote of 1930. In a 1934 article, Roula Koromila, reported Interior Minister Ioánnis Moutzourídis' admission that Tsaldaris himself was the "τροχοπέδη" (brake) preventing the bill that would have allowed women to stand for national office. The stalemate forced activists into the courts, where the Athens First‑Instance Court rejected all female candidacies on 1 February 1934, partly due to low female electoral registration (about 4,000 women registered). His wife Lina Tsaldari was a right-wing suffragist.

=== Iceland ===
Name	Lifespan	Occupation	Opposition to women's suffrage
Jón Magnússon	1859–1926	Politician, Prime Minister of Iceland	Magnússon expressed concern that the sudden enfranchisement of all women could lead to the formation of a new gender-based political faction or bloc, which might significantly reshape political power by electing predominantly women representatives. He cited the example of Reykjavík, where women had previously formed separate voting lists, as a precedent illustrating this possibility, an outcome that worried many conservative politicians.
Jón Jónsson í Múla	1855–1912	Farmer and member of Alþingi	He is credited with proposing in 1911 that women aged 40 and older should get the right to vote. Although he was generally opposed to women's suffrage, he made this age-limited proposal because he considered it "completely unwise to increase the electorate by two-thirds all at once." This was intended to slow down the sudden empowerment of a large new group of women voters.
Sigurður Sigurðsson	1864–1926	Politician, member of Alþingi	Sigurðsson stated: "Political work is no game. It is almost a dirty job, and in such work, we must protect the women of the nation."
Lárus Bjarnason	1866–1934	Politician, member of Alþingi	Bjarnason stated: "This very large expansion, which increases the number of voters by more than half, could have incalculable consequences..." is documented in discussions around the 1911 suffrage reforms in Iceland.

=== Ireland ===
Name	Lifespan	Occupation	Opposition to women's suffrage
John Dillon	1851–1927	Politician	Dillon, a member of parliament and deputy leader of the Irish Parliamentary Party (IPP), opposed extending the vote to women. In a speech he stated that women's suffrage would, in his view, undermine Western civilisation and overturn what he regarded as the divinely mandated authority of men within the home.
William Edward Hartpole Lecky	1838–1903	Politician, historian and essayist	Lecky opposed women's suffrage. While he acknowledged that women brought some desirable qualities to legislation, he believed the emotional element in Parliament was already sufficient. He questioned whether women would truly want seats in Parliament, given the abuse and "names" politicians were exposed to.
John Redmond	1856–1918	Politician	Redmond and the IPP voted against the Parliamentary Franchise (Women) Bill in 1912. This bill would have extended the vote to some women, but Redmond and his MPs sided with Prime Minister H. H. Asquith, an anti-suffragist. According to Historian Margaret Ward, Redmond's opposition to suffrage was not just a matter of political expediency, but rooted in long-standing personal doubts about women's right to vote.

=== Italy ===
Name	Lifespan	Occupation	Opposition to women's suffrage
Giovanni Giolitti	1842–1928	Prime minister of Italy (1892–1921)	Giolitti was firmly opposed to granting women the right to vote at the national level during his time as Italian Prime Minister. During the 1912 electoral reform debates, when some deputies proposed extending suffrage to women, Giolitti strongly rejected the idea, calling it "too risky" and "a leap in the dark." He argued that women's suffrage should only be considered gradually, starting with local elections, and only after women had demonstrated full exercise of their civil rights. Instead of advancing the issue, Giolitti appointed a commission to study legal reforms, effectively postponing women's suffrage indefinitely. As a result, all proposals for women's voting rights during his tenure were defeated.
Pope Pius X	1835–1914	Head of the Catholic Church	In a 1906 address he stated "A woman should not vote, but devote herself to a higher ideal of human good," and he added, "God save us from political feminism!" Pius X publicly opposed any form of women's suffrage, a position conveyed through official channels. Despite this principled objection, many Catholic women did not fully accept the prohibition. Activists in France cited his opposition as their chief argument against enfranchising women.

=== Netherlands ===
Name	Lifespan	Occupation	Opposition to women's suffrage
Hendrikus Colijn	1869–1944	ARP leader, Prime-Minister (five cabinets, 1925–39)	Colijn accepted the 1919 reform only under party discipline; in 1937 his fourth cabinet rolled back several civil-law gains for women and openly lamented "premature political rights" for them.
Abraham Kuyper	1837–1920	Founder of the Anti-Revolutionary Party (ARP) and Prime-Minister (1901–05)	Kuyper and the Anti-Revolutionary Party (ARP) advocated a "huishouders-kiesrecht" (householders' vote) that would restrict the franchise to male heads of household, working together with the Roman Catholic Party; the proposal was ultimately defeated.

=== Norway ===
Name	Lifespan	Occupation	Opposition to women's suffrage
Johan Christian Heuch	1838–1904	Bishop in the Church of Norway and politician for the Conservative Party	Present at Parliament's (Stortinget) first debate on women's suffrage in 1890. Bishop J.C. Heuch, a leading Conservative, opposed it, arguing it would undermine women's identity and "make her a deformed monstrosity, a thing of no gender," leading to "degradation, the disturbance of the home, the successive disintegration of the family and a thereby unavoidable moral decline."
Ole Olsen Malm	1854–1917	Physician, veterinarian, civil servant and politician	In 1907, Malm argued in Parliament that involving women in the "maelstrom of public life" and "strong brain work" would make them ill, suggesting instead that improving men's conditions would allow women "a carefree marriage."

=== Portugal ===
Name	Lifespan	Occupation	Opposition to women's suffrage
Afonso Costa	1838–1904	Republican party premier & justice minister	Costa's 1913 Electoral Code reversed earlier suffrage gains by explicitly excluding women and sharply restricting male eligibility. Reacting to the post-revolution surge in voter participation, Costa sought to rein in what he viewed as destabilizing democratization.
António de Oliveira Salazar	1889–1970	Prime Minister of Portugal	Under Oliveira Salazar's Estado Novo regime, Portuguese women saw a gradual return of limited suffrage: the 1931 Decree No. 19,694 granted the vote to women heads of households or those with secondary or higher education (while men needed only literacy); in 1934 these women could also vote in local council elections; a 1946 reform kept the same educational threshold for women but required only male literacy; and in 1968 full gender parity in voting rights was achieved, albeit still limited to literate citizens, which disproportionately excluded women. The first national election open to these qualified women was held on February 8, 1934.

=== Russia ===
Name	Lifespan	Occupation	Opposition to women's suffrage
Ivan Grigorievich Shcheglovitov	1861–1917	Minister of Justice; Council of State member	In the 3rd Duma, Shcheglovitov opposed women's suffrage, arguing that women's "very nature [is] inclined to passion, [and] could only encourage even more the development of political fervor, hindering the quiet and mature discussion of complex legislative matters." He maintained that "for the majority of women there remains an extraordinarily significant real barrier to the realization of these rights, namely their duties as mother of families and housewives." Shcheglovitov insisted that "one of the chief tasks of the twentieth century... consists of keeping women in the sphere most suited to them - the family and the home."
Filipp Alekseevich Kruglikov	1856–c.1906	Peasant deputy, 1st State Duma (Voronezh)	F. A. Kruglikov, along with fellow deputies P. A. Heyden and D. I. Shakhovsky, shared Maksim Kovalevsky's position that involving women in parliamentary activity was premature, arguing that such work was still unfamiliar even for men. They also noted that most deputies lacked understanding of peasant life and the role of women within it. As a result, the assembly decided to postpone decisions on women's suffrage, considering the issue too complex and requiring comprehensive legal reforms before political equality could be addressed.

=== Spain ===
Name	Lifespan	Occupation	Opposition to women's suffrage
Victoria Kent	1891–1987	Lawyer, deputy of the Radical Socialist Republican Party	Kent opposed the immediate extension of the vote to Spanish women during the 1931 debates in the Constituent Cortes. She contended that most women were still subject to the influence of their husbands and parish priests and therefore would cast ballots that strengthened conservative, clerical forces rather than the progressive aims of the new Republic. Kent repeated this argument through 1931-32, even as other feminists advocated for full suffrage.
Margarita Nelken	1894–1968	Writer, Socialist deputy	Nelken opposed granting Spanish women the vote in the early 1930s, arguing that their limited education and political naivety would make them "simply duplicate the votes of patriarchal powers," thereby strengthening conservative forces. She repeated this caution in parliamentary speeches and public lectures, urging that women first receive adequate schooling and civic instruction before exercising the franchise. Even after universal suffrage was enacted in 1931, she continued to frame education, not the vote, as the prerequisite for genuine emancipation, a theme she reiterated in later essays and talks.
Pilar Primo de Rivera	1907–1991	Head of Sección Femenina (women's wing of the Falange)	Primo de Rivera presented women's political role in terms of National-Catholic domesticity and opposed an expansive interpretation of universal suffrage. Contemporary analyses note that the Sección Femenina's chief purpose was to "indoctrinate women into the values of National Catholicism," a mission that placed family service above electoral citizenship. Cultural historians add that Primo de Rivera presented emblematic gestures, such as ceremonially delivering an embroidered flag, to reinforce a vision of womanhood rooted in patriotic household labor rather than in parliamentary participation. Within feminist literary scholarship, she is singled out as the "rampant anti-feminist" who argued that female suffrage would imperil Spain's social order.

=== Sweden ===
Name	Lifespan	Occupation	Opposition to women's suffrage
Fredrik Barnekow	1839–1912	Politician	Member of the Country/Lantmanna Party (Swedish: Lantmannapartiet). Second Chamber MP. Opposed women's suffrage, arguing that women were too noble for political life and too important in raising future generations to be allowed to leave the home for politics. He also invoked the natural difference between men and women.
Anders Göransson	1845-1927	Politician	Member of the Country/Lantmanna Party (Swedish: Lantmannapartiet), Second Chamber MP. Opposed women's suffrage, arguing that women had shown no need or wish for franchise rights, based on his experience as chair of his local municipal assembly.
Martin Nisser	1840–1913	Industrialist and politician	A member of the Protectionist Party, Nisser believed that the directive that "women should keep silent in the churches" still held validity, and therefore argued it would be unfair to grant women the right to speak publicly outside the home.
Johan Fredrik Nyström	1855–1918	Politician	A member of the staunchly conservative Protectionist Party, invoked the "keep to their calling" argument against women's suffrage. He asserted that "it is an untruth, against which history protests from the first page to the last, that the sexes are equal and therefore should have equal rights. Everything great in the world has been accomplished by men". Nyström further claimed that women were of an "impulsive nature" and "loved extremes," grounding his opposition in an essentialist and hierarchical conception of gender, and arguing that women's supposed nature made them unfit for political rights.
Annie Åkerhielm	1869–1956	Writer, journalist, anti-suffrage activist	Åkerhielm actively campaigned against women's suffrage and democracy, publishing the novel Fru Fanny and the poetry Till Skånes kvinna in 1904. Throughout her career, she contributed to politically conservative newspapers such as Gefle-Posten and Nya Dagligt Allehanda, which were known for their opposition to women's voting rights.
Gustaf Fredrik Östberg	1847–1920	Politician	Leading conservative politician and the first chairman of the Swedish Moderate Party (Moderata samlingspartiet). He argued that women's suffrage should be postponed until the expansion of voting rights for men had been achieved, using this tactical argument to delay women's enfranchisement.

=== Switzerland ===
Name	Lifespan	Occupation	Opposition to women's suffrage
Annemarie Düringer	1925–2014	Actress and anti-suffrage activist	Düringer participated in anti-suffrage campaigns and media appearances in the 1960s; represented a socially conservative worldview.
Karl Hackhofer	1893–1961	Politician	Hackhofer of the Christian Democratic People's Party (CVP) actively participated in the meetings of the anti-suffrage committees, attending several reunions of the Committee of Swiss Women Against Women's Suffrage in the lead-up to the 1959 referendum.
Gertrud Haldimann	1907–2001	Writer, journalist, anti-suffrage leader	Haldimann co-founded the Women's Committee Against the Introduction of Women's Suffrage in Switzerland in 1958. This became the Federation of Swiss Women against Women's Suffrage in 1959, which she chaired until 1967. She argued that women's suffrage was incompatible with Swiss direct democracy, unlike in other European countries where women could vote.
Verena Keller	1911–1992	Writer and anti-suffrage activist	Authored "Die Gründe gegen das Frauenstimmrecht in der Schweiz" (published in Neue Zürcher Zeitung, p. 132) and delivered speeches, such as at the Bundesfeier in Fahrwangen (p. 132). Her arguments focused on maintaining traditional gender roles and the perceived threat of societal instability due to women's suffrage.
Ida Monn-Krieger	1916–1970	Anti-suffrage leader	Monn-Krieger co-founded the Anti-suffrage Switizerland committee and served as the federation's secretary from 1959, later succeeding Gertrud Haldimann as president after Haldimann resigned in 1967. Monn-Krieger feared the loss of women's traditional role, believing women belonged at home raising children.
Hanna Seiler-Frauchiger	1902–1993	Anti-suffrage activist and writer	A leading figure in the Zürich branch, she authored "Gesellschaftliche Struktur und Frauenstimmrecht" (published in Neue Zürcher Zeitung, p. 132) and was actively involved in propaganda and lobbying efforts. Her correspondence with Gertrud Haldimann-Weiss reflects her belief in the movement's responsibility to oppose the "worldwide destruction of values" (p. 4). Her opposition was rooted in a conservative, elitist perspective, fearing societal change through women's political participation (p. 42).
Josefine Steffen-Zehnder	1902–1964	Anti-suffrage leader	Steffen-Zehnder founded the Action Committee Against the Introduction of Women's Suffrage in Switzerland in 1958, later renamed the Swiss Women's Committee Against Women's Suffrage. She stated that collective action was necessary because individual opponents were dismissed as "stupid and backward." The committee sought to legitimize anti-suffrage advocacy. Steffen-Zehnder also led the Lucerne Women's Committee Against Unrestricted Women's Suffrage, which petitioned against granting women municipal voting rights.

=== United Kingdom ===
Name	Lifespan	Occupation	Opposition to women's suffrage
Queen Victoria	1819–1901	Monarch	Vocal opponent of women's suffrage, describing the movement as a "mad, wicked folly." She believed women's roles should remain within the domestic sphere and actively discouraged advocacy for women's rights, stating in 1870 her desire to "enlist everyone who can speak or write to join in checking this mad, wicked folly of ‘Women's rights'."
Eliza Lynn Linton	1822–1898	Novelist and anti-suffrage journalist	Wrote extensively against women's suffrage and feminism, referring to suffragists as the "shrieking sisterhood." She argued that women belonged in the domestic sphere and should not participate in political life.
Mary Augusta Ward	1851–1920	Novelist and anti-suffrage leader	As president of the Women's National Anti-Suffrage League, Ward maintained that women's influence was best exerted through traditional roles rather than through voting, and she led organized opposition to women's suffrage.
Violet Markham	1872–1959	Social reformer and anti-suffrage writer	Argued that men and women had "complementary, not identical" talents and should occupy different political roles. She criticized suffrage advocates for ignoring "hard facts and natural law," and promoted alternative avenues for women's contributions.
Margaret Elizabeth Leigh	1849–1945	Philanthropist	Involved in the Women's National Anti-Suffrage League, a key organization against women's voting rights.
Gertrude Bell	1868–1926	Writer and anti-suffrage activist	Bell was a founding member of the WNASL in 1908 and served as president of its northern branch. She initially believed women could succeed without the vote, though her opposition reportedly softened after 1918.
Ethel Bertha Harrison	1851–1916	Essayist and anti-suffrage activist	Served on the League's central committee and wrote essays contending that women were unsuited to political activities and should not be granted the vote.
Sophia Lonsdale	1852–1936	Social reformer	Vocal committee member and early participant in anti-suffrage campaigns.
Hilaire Belloc	1870–1953	Writer and politician	Publicly opposed women's suffrage, expressing his belief that women should not be enfranchised.
Beatrice Chamberlain	1862–1918	Educationist	Contributed to the League's efforts against women's voting rights.
Mary Fox-Strangways	1852–1935	Socialite	Prominent anti-suffragist, using her social position to oppose the movement.
Violet Graham	1854–1940	Anti-suffrage leader	Led the Scottish National Anti-Suffrage League in 1910 when it formally affiliated with the English organization, and was a prominent advocate for the cause.
Evelyn Baring, 1st Earl of Cromer	1841–1917	Statesman and anti-suffrage leader	Aring was a leader in the anti-suffrage movement, serving as president of the Men's League for Opposing Woman Suffrage in 1908, and later, from 1910 to 1912, of its successor, the National League for Opposing Woman Suffrage.
George Curzon, 1st Marquess Curzon of Kedleston	1859–1925	Politician	Openly opposed women's suffrage, stating that he was unconvinced it was "fair, or desirable, or wise" to add six million women to the electorate. Did not block the bill to avoid conflict between the Lords and Commons.
Philip J. Stanhope	1847–1923	Politician and anti-suffrage leader	Became joint president of the National League for Opposing Woman Suffrage in 1912. In 1914, a suffragette attacked him with a dogwhip at Euston Station, mistaking him for Prime Minister H. H. Asquith.

== North America ==
=== Canada ===
Name	Lifespan	Occupation	Opposition to women's suffrage
Isabel Hamilton-Gordon	1857–1939	Author, philanthropist, and women's advocate	President of National Council of Women of Canada (NCWC). Initially cautious about women's suffrage and concerned it might harm the NCWC's reform efforts, she avoided publicly supporting the cause, noting its political controversy. The NCWC only narrowly endorsed suffrage as an official policy in 1910, the year she first advocated for it within the organization.
William H. Hearst	1864–1941	Politician, premier of Ontario	Seventh premier of Ontario. Initially a conservative opponent of women's suffrage, aligned with the AOWSC's views early in his premiership. However, he shifted his stance by 1917, when his government passed legislation granting women the vote in Ontario.
Mary Plummer	1877–1955	Canadian Army officer and humanitarian	Between 1914 and 1917, Plummer served as corresponding secretary of the Association Opposed to Woman Suffrage in Canada (AOWSC), promoting its mission to oppose women's enfranchisement on the grounds that it would harm the state's best interests. She facilitated membership recruitment, organized informational materials, and articulated the organization's stance through statements and publications.
Stephen Leacock	1869–1944	Writer and economist	Leacock is widely recognized for his short-story cycle Sunshine Sketches of a Little Town (1912). Several of his essays address what he called "the woman problem," expressing reservations about feminism and women's suffrage. In pieces such as "The Woman Question," he depicted contemporary suffragists humorously and maintained that women were, in his view, naturally inclined toward domestic responsibilities. Although he conceded that women were legally free to enter most professions, he contended that practical outcomes would remain limited because of what he regarded as enduring gender differences.
Andrew Macphail	1864–1938	Physician and writer	In two essays published in 1910, "The American Woman" and "The Psychology of the Suffragette", Andrew Macphail argued that feminism reflected and accelerated what he perceived as the decline of American society, which he characterised as "vulgar," materialistic, and in moral decay. He advanced a vision of racial and gender hierarchy that placed Anglo-Celtic men at the apex and claimed women's suffrage threatened this arrangement. Macphail, along with contemporaries such as Stephen Leacock, described feminist gains as challenges to what they regarded as immutable laws of nature and as potential sources of racial "degeneration." Yet, as editor of the University Magazine, Macphail allowed opposing views, even publishing a pro-suffrage piece by Sonia Leathes alongside his own critique.
Rodmond Roblin	1853–1937	Politician	Businessman and Premier of Manitoba. In a 1914 debate with suffragist Nellie McClung, Roblin declared, "Nice women don't want the vote," and argued that women's place was in the home, claiming political equality would cause domestic strife and that women's emotions made them unfit for the franchise.
Herbert Mowat	1863–1928	Politician and lawyer	Lawyer and Ontario Supreme Court justice. Mowat actively participated in and supported the Association Opposed to Woman Suffrage in Canada, delivering speeches that reinforced the organization's anti-suffrage stance.
Clementina Trenholme (Fessenden)	1843–1918	Author and social organiser	Fessenden, founding secretary of the Imperial Order Daughters of the Empire (IODE), was a community leader and widow of an Anglican minister who became a leading figure in the antisuffrage movement in Ontario. She opposed women's suffrage through letters to newspapers and public advocacy, arguing that suffrage was "the thin edge of the wedge, opening the door to the inner room of socialism, agnosticism, anarchy, feminism, each and all making for the ‘dismemberment of the Empire.'" She believed that a woman's true power lay in the domestic sphere and that granting women the vote would threaten the sanctity of the family and the British Empire. Her outspoken stance, rooted in maternalist arguments and imperial loyalty, made her a prominent voice among antisuffrage women in Ontario.
Margaret Vallance Taylor	1840–1922	Anti-suffrage activist	Taylor, who served as president of the National Council of Women of Canada (NCWC) from 1899 to 1902 and again from 1910 to 1911, opposed women's suffrage in 1910. She stated that extending the vote to women would increase political corruption, arguing that "manhood suffrage... had been more or less disastrous since their votes can be bought. So, too, would those of the women." Taylor and other opponents feared that supporting suffrage would harm the NCWC's reform work and public reputation. When the NCWC narrowly endorsed women's suffrage in 1910 by a vote of 71 to 51, Taylor protested the decision
Sarah Trumbull Van Lennep	1862–1952	Philanthropist, anti-suffrage leader	President of Association Opposed to Woman Suffrage in Canada. Warren did not initially believe in universal suffrage. She founded and served as president of the Association Opposed to Woman Suffrage in Canada in 1914, but ultimately accepted women's right to vote when it was granted in 1917.

=== Mexico ===
Name	Lifespan	Occupation	Opposition to women's suffrage
Félix F. Palavicini	1881–1952	Journalist, writer and federal deputy; member of the 1916-17 Constituent Congress	During the January 1917 debates on Article 34 of the Mexican Constitution, he asked the committee to specify that "citizens" meant men only, argued that otherwise "we are in danger of women organising to vote and be voted for."
Silvano Barba González	1895–1967	Lawyer, president of the Partido Nacional Revolucionario (PRN) 1936-38; later governor of Jalisco and federal senator	As PRN president he issued a 4 Sept 1936 "Manifiesto del PRN" stating that women should first be mobilised in party-guided "auxiliary" organisations and gradually prepared for political rights. The PRN leadership did not advance President Lázaro Cárdenas's 1937 suffrage amendment to the promulgation stage, citing fears of clerical influence on female voters.

=== United States of America ===
Name	Lifespan	Occupation	Opposition to women's suffrage
Catharine Beecher	1800–1878	Educator and writer	Beecher said that women should confine their efforts to the home and school, institutions she viewed as vital to society. While she accepted traditional gender roles, she believed women's true power and influence came from their work in domestic and educational spheres.
Josephine Jewell Dodge	1855–1928	Childcare reformer and anti-suffrage leader	In 1911, she helped found and became president of the National Association Opposed to Woman Suffrage. Dodge held the perspective that there is danger in adding to the number of politically uninformed voters, which was already seen as a problem. She also believed that if women became involved in the world of partisan politics, they would lose some of their moral authority.
Helen Kendrick Johnson	1844–1917	Writer, poet, and activist	Johnson was "an avid anti-suffragette" and the author of the 1897 book Woman and the Republic. She was a founder of The Guidon and an officer of the New York State Association Opposed to Woman Suffrage (NYSAOWS). In Woman and the Republic, she questioned whether woman suffrage was democratic, suggesting "the anti-suffrage view might be the ultra conservative one, and that democratic principles, strictly and broadly applied," did not necessitate extending the vote to women. She characterized her work as a "negative organization" focused on resisting what she viewed as an unfitting role for women in public politics.
Kate Gannett Wells	1838–1911	Writer, social reformer, and anti-suffragist	Wells opposed woman suffrage as an "unwise" method, believing it would hinder women's ability to work "more disinterestedly in both public and private positions" by affiliating them with political parties. She argued suffrage gave women "neither added power nor influence" in business or education, and stated it would "weaken the force of family life," "bring church matters into politics," "lessen chivalry and tenderness between men and women," and politicize social reform. For the good of "home, school, and state," she urged women remain nonpartisan.
Madeleine Vinton Dahlgren	1825–1898	Poet, writer, and translator	She was a prominent opponent of woman suffrage. Dahlgren believed that "suffrage was an affront to divine law and the natural order and a threat to family and society". Using her writings and her influential social position in Washington, Dahlgren campaigned against woman suffrage alongside other socially prominent women. She authored Thoughts on Female Suffrage and in Vindication of Woman's True Rights, articulating her defense of traditional roles for women.
Molly Elliot Seawell	1860–1916	Historian and writer	Seawell was a prominent anti-suffragist who argued that granting women the vote led to negative social outcomes, including higher taxes, increased poverty and divorce, illiteracy, and greater political influence from saloonkeepers and socialists. She claimed that women in suffrage states faced more violence and were even at risk of being legally obligated to support their husbands. Seawell also suggested that suffrage could revive African American voting and criticized militant suffragists abroad, notably Emmeline Pankhurst. Despite strong rebuttals from suffragists like Adèle Clark, Seawell continued to promote her views through publications and public commentary.
Ida Tarbell	1857–1944	Writer, journalist, biographer and lecturer	Tarbell viewed the campaign for the vote as a diversion from what she considered more pressing issues, such as economic and social reform. Tarbell argued that many women who opposed suffrage did so out of concern for preserving existing social roles and feared that political change might undermine more impactful forms of civic engagement. She believed that women could contribute meaningfully to society without necessarily participating in the electoral process.
Grace Duffield Goodwin	1869–1926	Author and anti-suffragist	President of the District of Columbia Anti-Suffrage Association. Led anti-suffrage campaigns, served on the National Association Opposed to Woman Suffrage's executive committee, chaired the D.C. Auxiliary in 1912, and debated Carrie Chapman Catt.
Annie Riley Hale	1859–1944	Teacher, author and social critic	Hale argued against women's suffrage before the U.S. House Committee. In 1916, she published The Eden Sphinx, claiming that women's lack of political power was due to their failure to influence men as mothers, and that women in the United States already had sufficient legal and economic rights. She also published a pamphlet in 1917 discussing the biological and sociological aspects of suffrage.

== Oceania ==
=== Australia ===
Name	Lifespan	Occupation	Opposition to women's suffrage
Carrie M. Reid	1878–1970	Anti-suffrage activist	The Anti-Franchise League was co-founded by Reid, and Freda Derham. In July 1900 they wrote a letter to The Argus stating that they did not wish to have the vote. Reid and Derham referred to themselves as "Victoria's girls" and positioned themselves as representatives of a younger generation than those who organized the 1891 suffrage petition. At the time that petition was compiled, Reid was 15 and Derham 12. They claimed their perspectives were more contemporary and better aligned with the views of the general population.
Freda Derham	1871–1957	Anti-suffrage activist	The Anti-Franchise League was co-founded by Derham, and Reid. In July 1900 they wrote a letter stating that they did not wish to have the vote.
Jacob Goldstein	1839–1910	Anti-suffrage activist	Goldstein chaired the meeting and was appointed organising secretary of the Anti-Franchise League, alongside Carrie Reid and Freda Derham as joint secretaries. His involvement, in contrast to the activism of his wife Isabella and daughter Vida Goldstein, both leading suffragists, led to a permanent separation from Isabella.
Arthur Sachse	1860–1920	Politician	In May 1892, Sachse was elected to the Legislative Council as the member for North-Eastern Province. His political stance aligned with the Council's conservative outlook, which regarded women's suffrage as "another socialistic advance" to be opposed.
Nathaniel Levi	1830–1908	Politician	As a parliamentary candidate, he toured towns advocating issues he supported, including ‘one man, one vote' for Legislative Council elections. Participated in anti-suffrage meetings.
Malcolm McKenzie	1849–1933	Politician	Participated in legislative opposition to women's suffrage through association with the Anti-Franchise League.
P. J. Gandon	1850–1920	Anti-suffrage activist	Gandon, secretary of the Anti-Female Suffrage League, urged Prime Minister Barton in 1901 to reject women's suffrage, calling it a dangerous, unnecessary reform lacking public mandate. He argued it had failed elsewhere, claimed women were already represented, and claimed that enfranchising the uneducated would harm the state. Gandon viewed political engagement as unsuitable for most women, and labeled the movement as socialist and destabilizing.

=== New Zealand ===
Name	Lifespan	Occupation	Opposition to women's suffrage
Henry Smith Fish	1838–1897	Anti-suffrage activist	Co-founder of New Zealand Anti-Franchise League. Fish actively opposed extending the vote to women and organized a major anti-suffrage petition, but his credibility suffered when it was revealed that he had paid canvassers for signatures, many of which were found to be fictitious or duplicated.
Richard Seddon	1845–1906	Prime Minister	Seddon opposed women's suffrage, especially during the crucial debate in the Legislative Council in 1893. He and other opponents tried to block the 1893 women's suffrage bill, but their efforts backfired. Two councillors who had been against women's suffrage changed their votes to protest Seddon's tactics. This unexpected support helped the bill pass.
Walter Carncross	1855–1940	Politician	Carncross was member of the House of Representatives for Taieri; he opposed women's suffrage by introducing an amendment proposing that if women were to be granted the right to vote, they should also be eligible to serve as Members of Parliament. This move was widely viewed as a deliberate attempt to derail the suffrage bill, rather than a genuine endorsement of women's full political participation. It reportedly angered members of the Legislative Council and contributed to the defeat of the suffrage bill.

== South America ==
=== Argentina ===
Name	Lifespan	Occupation	Opposition to women's suffrage
Armando Antille	1883–1955	Lawyer and politician, national senator and finance minister	In the 1946 Senate debate he insisted women were "not equal to men," arguing their duty was home and motherhood and rejecting their eligibility for office.
Reynaldo Pastor	1898–1987	National deputy (Partido Demócrata Nacional)	During the Chamber of Deputies debate he argued that women's vote should be only optional because it was "incompatible with their role as mothers." (1947)
Enrique Mosca	1880–1950	Governor of Santa Fe Province (1920–24)	In 1922 he refused to promulgate the progressive 1921 provincial constitution because it enfranchised women (and foreigners), nullifying their newly won municipal vote.

=== Brazil ===
Name	Lifespan	Occupation	Opposition to women's suffrage
Lauro Sodré	1858–1944	Politician, Deputy, later governor of Pará	During the 1890-91 constitutional assembly he stated "It is indisputable that, the moment we open the field of politics to women, she will necessarily have to yield to the superiority of our sex in this area." Thereby excluding women from the Brazilian Constitution of 1891.
Pedro Américo	1843–1905	Painter & Deputy (Pernambuco)	"A woman's mission is more domestic than public, more moral than political; her proper place is the home, not the forum or the political assembly." (1891)
Serzedelo Corrêa	1858–1932	Deputy (Pará)	Described women as the "guardian angel of the family" and said that thrusting them into political battles would "destroy the family." (1891)
Muniz Freire	1861–1918	Deputy & former Governor (Espírito Santo)	Argued that women voting would bring "competition of the sexes in active life" and lead to anarchy. (1891)
Coelho e Campos	1844–1919	Senator (Sergipe)	Declared: "This is a matter I do not consider; my wife will not vote." (1891)

== Asia ==
=== China ===
Name	Lifespan	Occupation	Opposition to women's suffrage
Yuan Shikai	1859–1916	First president of the Republic of China	In 1912, Shikai consolidated autocratic power and moved to restrict the women's suffrage movement. This led to an incident involving Tang Qunying, who led a pistol-armed group into parliament; when the suffrage question was raised, their jeering forced the session to adjourn. In March 1913, Shikai banned the Women's Suffrage Alliance, ordered the arrest of Qunying, and dissolved pro-suffrage gatherings, effectively ending China's first organized suffrage campaign. By November 1913, the Women's Suffrage Movement was formally outlawed, leading to the closure of many progressive women's journals and a decline in early feminist activism in China.
Duan Qirui	1865–1936	Premier & Anhui-clique war-lord	As head of the 1914–16 provisional government, Duan oversaw constitution-drafting conferences that refused every proposal to insert equal-voting clauses, despite mass lobbying by the Women's Suffrage Alliance.
Zhang Shizhao	1881–1973	Intellectual, Minister of Education	In 1925 he urged Duan to close the Beijing Women's Normal University and clamp down on activists, denouncing their campaign for political rights.

=== Japan ===
Name	Lifespan	Occupation	Opposition to women's suffrage
Itō Hirobumi	1838–1897	Prime Minister	During Hirobumi's leadership, the Meiji Civil Code and related laws explicitly excluded women from political participation, such as voting and holding office. The Japanese constitution, specifically, the Constitution of the Empire of Japan (Meiji Constitution), drafted under his direction and modeled after European systems, served as a central barrier by legally limiting women's rights and reinforcing male authority.
Mori Arinori	1847–1889	Education Minister	Arinori opposed universal suffrage and favored limiting voting rights to the male educated elite, arguing that political participation should be weighted toward those with higher education. He promoted gender complementarity and nation-building, advocating reforms like mutual consent in marriage while confining women to roles as wives, mothers, and educators.
Fujimura Yoshirō	1871–1933	Newspaper owner, House of Peers member (1917–33)	In 1921 the House of Peers, led by Baron Yoshirō, rejected a bill to revise Article 5 of the Public Peace Police Law to let women attend political meetings and rallies. He deemed women's "participation in political movements is extremely boring," insisted it "goes against natural laws in a physiological as well as psychological sense," maintained "the woman's place is in the home," stating granting them political rights "subverts the family system," and branded these "peculiar women trying to become politically active" as "extremely shameful."
Kiyoura Keigo	1850–1942	Prime Minister of Japan in 1924	In the 1921 House-of-Peers debate on revising Article 5 of the Security Police Law, which barred women from political meetings, Kiyoura declared that "a woman's fundamental mission (joshi no honbun) lies in the home; political activity violates that duty" (p. 701). The peers overturned the lower house's pro-amendment vote the very next day. When a municipal-suffrage bill reached cabinet in 1931, Kiyoura told colleagues it would "first ruin the household and then the state," and the measure died in the House of Peers (p. 705).

=== Turkey ===
Name	Lifespan	Occupation	Opposition to women's suffrage
Kozmidi Efendi	1870 – ?	Istanbul deputy	Per Türkiye Büyük Millet Meclisi, 1909, p. 356, he argued that Ottoman women "do not directly take part in political affairs ... they vote only through the men to whom they are subject," and warned that giving them the franchise would mean "attempting something that even Europe has not yet done."
Lütfi Fikri Bey	1872–1934	Dersim deputy	Rejected the idea of counting women in the electorate, likening them to "children, who also belong to the nation but are not allowed to vote" (pp. 355–356). He argued that, rather than being enfranchised, women should be represented in parliament by male deputies on their behalf
