= 1971 Swiss women's suffrage referendum =

- 7 February 1971
- Federal decision on the introduction of women's suffrage and electoral law in federal matters

Results
Choice	Votes	%
For	621,109	65.73%
Against	323,882	34.27%
Valid votes	944,991	98.92%
Invalid or blank votes	10,330	1.08%
Total votes	955,321	100.00%
Registered voters/turnout	1,654,708	57.73%
- For: 50-55% 55-60% 60–65% 65–70% 70–75% 75-80% >80% Against: 50-55% 55-60% 60–65% 65–70% 70–75% 75-80% >80%

A referendum on the introduction of women's suffrage was held in Switzerland on 7 February 1971. Only men were allowed to vote and the result was that 65.7% voted for the introduction. The outcome was expected, as several cantons had introduced women's suffrage in the years previous, and the Swiss Government and several political parties actively supported women's suffrage. It was the second national referendum after one in 1959, in which men voted against the introduction of women's suffrage.

== Background ==
In Switzerland, women's suffrage was demanded in Zurich in 1868, when women also wanted to have a vote in the revision of the cantonal constitution. After the demand was rejected, working women established the Working Women Association which by 1893 repeated the demand for women's suffrage. In 1909, the Swiss Association for Women's Suffrage was established, Its aim was for a complete women's suffrage and not only a restricted one in religious or educational matters. In aiming for a national women's suffrage, two attempts were made; a postulate prepared in the National Council (lower chamber of the Swiss Parliament) was presented to the Federal Council in 1919, and in 1929, with the support of the Social Democratic Party of Switzerland and the Swiss Association for Women Suffrage and a petition with over 200,000 signatures also demanded women's suffrage. Both attempts were unsuccessful. The Federal Councillor Heinrich Häberlin eventually left the project of women's suffrage to his successor. After several cantonal referendums on women's suffrage in the 1940s, the outcome was negative, in 1951, the Federal Council reasoned the time was not right for a national referendum on women's suffrage. Following this, surveys regarding women in relation to women's suffrage were undertaken in Basel-Stadt, Geneva and Zurich, in which a vast majority of the women supported women's suffrage. In 1957, the Federal Council revised its doubts on women's suffrage and openly supported it. Eventually a national referendum was held in 1959 which resulted in the men voting against women's suffrage. The Federation of Swiss women against women's suffrage was established by the Committee of Swiss women against women's suffrage. When female teachers of a girls' high school in Basel went on strike due to the outcome, some saw it as evidence that women were not ready for democracy.

== 1971 referendum ==
In 1968, the United Nations declared the International Year of Human Rights. When in 1968 the Federal Council wanted to sign the European Convention of Human Rights with the exclusion of women's suffrage, women's associations opposed this aim vigorously. In March 1969, thousands of women were led by Emilie Lieberherr to the Square in front of the Federal Palace, where they demanded women's suffrage. The Federal Council envisaged a new referendum on women's suffrage; the Federal Councillor Ludwig von Moos even saw women's suffrage as a "democratic requirement".

=== No campaign ===
The Federation of Swiss women against women's suffrage, through Gertrud Haldimann and Ida Monn-Krieger, still campaigned against suffrage but their allies withdrew their support with time. Also the Catholic conservative politicians began to support women's suffrage. A few days ahead of the referendum, Haldimann took part in a panel in the casino in Wohlen with representatives of several parties and Trudi Gerster, a prominent supporter of women's suffrage and also an elected member of the Grand Council of Basel.

=== Yes campaign ===
For the yes campaign the Association for Women's Suffrage was a major campaigner. Migros, the country's largest retail company was also a prominent factor in the campaign. The company formed a committee in support of the referendum within the company, printed bags publicising the yes campaign and published articles supportive of it in its company-owned magazine, which with a circulation of over 600,000 was one of the largest in Switzerland at the time. Also Coop, another major retailer of Switzerland supported the yes campaign, but less prominently.

=== Referendum ===
The referendum took place on 7 February 1971, and the result was that a majority of 65.7% approved women's suffrage. The approval was expected as several cantons had approved women's suffrage in the years before.

Choice	Popular vote		Cantons		
Choice	Votes	%	Full	Half	Total
For	621,109	65.7	14	3	15.5
Against	323,882	34.3	5	3	6.5
Blank votes	8,600	–	–	–	–
Invalid votes	1,730	–	–	–	–
Total	955,321	100	19	6	22
Registered voters/turnout	1,654,708	57.7	–	–	–

==== By canton ====
Canton	For	%	Against	%	Turnout
Zurich	119,631	66.83	59,375	33.17	62.34
Bern	95,466	66.52	48,044	33.48	51.32
Lucerne	29,459	62.72	17,512	37.28	60.10
Uri	2,477	36.34	4,340	63.66	71.57
Schwyz	5,945	42.22	8,136	57.78	57.51
Obwalden	1,668	46.72	1,902	53.28	50.74
Nidwalden	2,703	55.80	2,141	44.20	68.12
Glarus	2,692	41.32	3,823	58.68	62.85
Zug	6,699	59.91	4,483	40.09	66.29
Fribourg	19,404	71.08	7,893	28.92	53.80
Solothurn	22,030	64.11	12,331	35.89	58.36
Basel-Stadt	27,480	82.17	5,962	17.83	51.23
Basel-Landschaft	21,229	79.86	5,353	20.14	50.37
Schaffhausen	8,252	56.72	6,296	43.28	80.06
Appenzell Ausserrhoden	3,485	39.88	5,253	60.12	65.35
Appenzell Innerrhoden	574	28.92	1,411	71.08	52.48
St. Gallen	27,042	46.50	31,114	53.50	60.23
Grisons	12,778	54.84	10,524	45.16	55.26
Aargau	39,469	50.15	39,229	49.85	72.92
Thurgau	13,464	44.13	17,046	55.87	67.29
Ticino	20,527	75.34	6,719	24.66	47.45
Vaud	55,852	83.93	10,696	16.07	51.02
Valais	24,442	79.94	6,135	20.06	53.33
Neuchâtel	20,205	82.03	4,426	17.97	57.40
Geneva	38,136	91.07	3,738	8.93	56.41
Source: Swissvotes (archive link)

== Aftermath ==
The day after the referendum, a major Swiss tabloid, Blick, sported the headline 'Thanks for the Roses' on the front page accompanied with a naked blonde receiving roses from a man. Following the referendum, several cantons introduced women's suffrage, but not all. Appenzell Ausserrhoden introduced the cantonal women's suffrage in April 1989, but Appenzell Innerrhoden again rejected it and only introduced it in November 1990, following a ruling from the Federal Court.
