= Vårt Land =

Vårt Land means "Our Country" in Swedish and Norwegian.

- The Swedish title of "Maamme", the national anthem of Finland, originally a poem by Johan Ludvig Runeberg
- Vårt Land (Norwegian newspaper)
- Vårt Land (Swedish newspaper) was a Swedish newspaper, published 1885–1908, and later absorbed by the Nya Dagligt Allehanda
- Vårt Land (American newspaper) was a newspaper in Jamestown, New York, published 1890–1920, and written mainly in Swedish
