= International Conference on Human Rights =

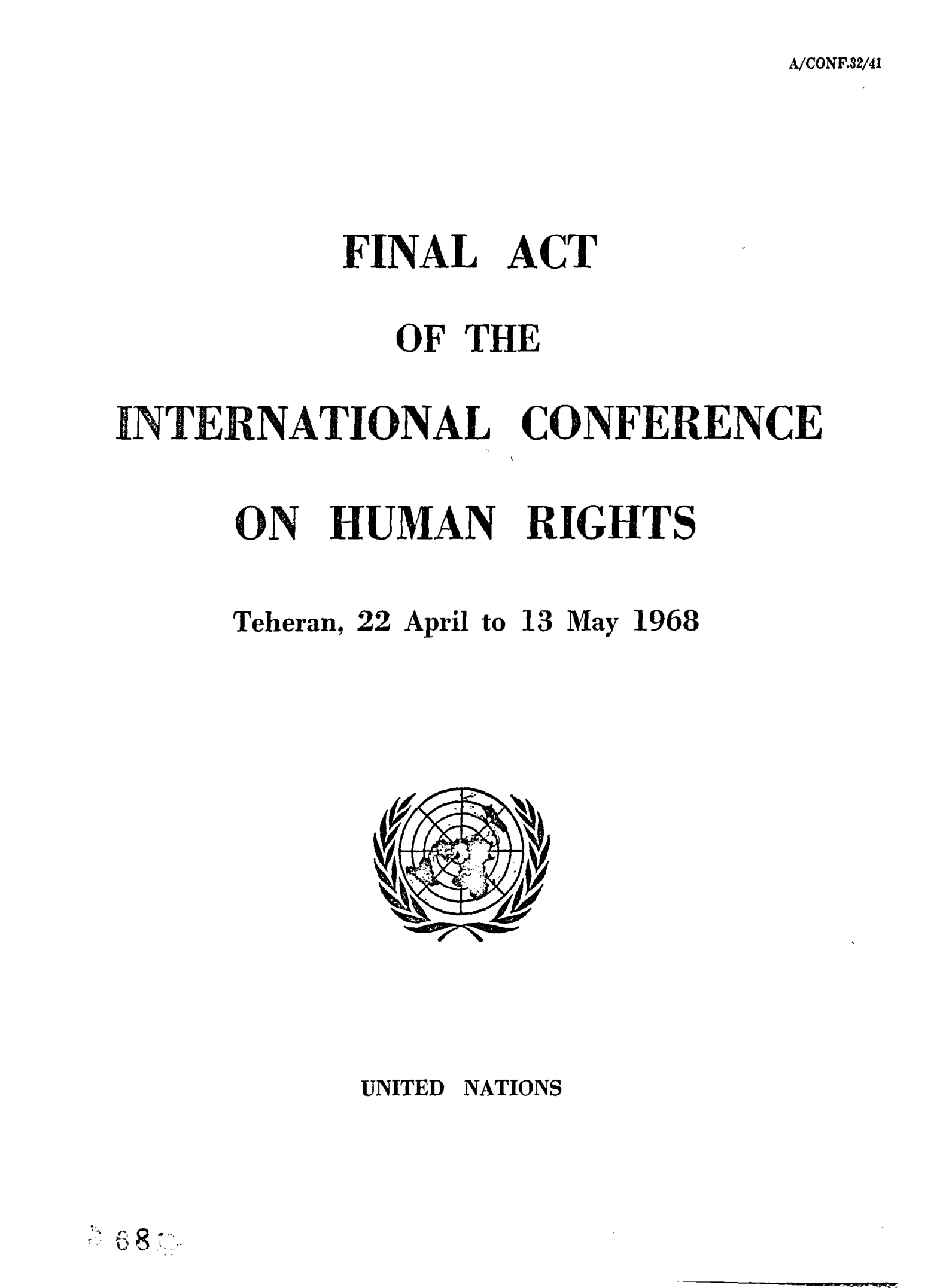
- Title page of the final act of the conference
- Host country: Iran (Tehran)
- Date: April 22 – May 13, 1968
- Participants: 84 Countries

The 1968 International Conference on Human Rights was the first United Nations gathering solely dedicated to advancing human rights. Convening in Tehran, Iran, the conference lasted three weeks from April 22 until May 13, 1968. Over the course of the three weeks, the conference brought together representatives from 84 states, four regional organizations, and 57 non-governmental organizations (NGOs)—along with numerous observers from various United Nations bodies, specialized agencies, and intergovernmental organizations. Invitees came from across the globe including Africa, Asia, the Middle East, and the Western world. Notably, more than two-thirds of the participating states were relatively undemocratic, as the wave of decolonization—once heralded as a path to self-determination—had increasingly given way to authoritarian rulers.

A major theme of discussion at Tehran was the growing divide between civil and political rights (favored by Western countries) and economic and social rights (prioritized by postcolonial states and socialist countries). The conference also saw the presence of Cold War competition, where the US garnered the support of Western bloc countries, while the Soviets promoted aligned themselves with the newly decolonized Afro-Asian bloc. Additionally, the conference resulted in the Proclamation of Tehran, which indirectly created a hierarchy of rights, prioritizing economic and social rights by declaring that economic and social development was a precondition for the realization of civil and political rights–however failing to comment on a reversal state about civil and political rights.

While the conference itself was not seen as a success, it represented significant strides for human rights at the time. It was preceded and overshadowed by the 1993 World Conference on Human Rights; though, this forum saw previously colonized states appear on the international stage to independently advocate their positions in human rights for the first time. While Western states arrived at the conference with the intention to strengthen existing UN systems and structures that emphasized political and civil rights, ideas regarding economic development and sovereignty of the recently decolonized countries of the Afro-Asian bloc ultimately dominated the discourse—challenging the previous status quo of international conferences where Western-centric ideas commanded the discussion.

Beyond being the first international gathering committed to addressing human rights, the conference reflected broader shifts with cultural, economic, and social implications that would motivate further progress in the human rights movement in following years.

== Background ==
=== Convening the 1968 International Year for Human Rights ===
In 1961, the United Nations General Assembly adopted Resolution 1961 (XVIII), designating 1968 as the International Year of Human Rights to commemorate the twentieth anniversary of the adoption of the Universal Declaration of Human Rights. The United Nations viewed 1968 as an opportune moment to reflect on global human rights advancements, recognizing that significant progress had been made in implementing human rights and fundamental freedoms. Additionally, they believed that designating 1968 for an international review would encourage Member States and relevant organizations to strengthen their efforts in the preceding years, striving to achieve the highest possible level of progress by then.

Proceeding Resolution 1961 (XVIII), in December 1965 the General Assembly adopted resolution 2081(XX), by which it was decided that there would be an international conference in 1968 held in Tehran, Iran, from April 22 to May 13 of that year. The purpose of the conference was to “(a) review the progress which has been made in the field of human rights since the adoption of the Universal Declaration of Human Rights; (b) evaluate the effectiveness of the methods used by the United Nations in the field of human rights, especially with respect to the elimination of all forms of racial discrimination and the practice of the policy of apartheid; and (c) formulate and prepare a programme of further measures to be taken subsequent to the celebrations of the International Year for Human Rights".

=== Confluences contextualizing the conference ===
To best understand the 1968 International Conference on Human Rights, it must be understood in the broader historical context of post-World War II geopolitics, the Cold War, and decolonization.

=== Decolonization and Second Generation Rights ===
Since the adoption of the Universal Declaration of Human Rights (UDHR) in 1948, and in the lead up to the first International Human Rights Conference, the political landscape of the United Nations had been fundamentally transformed by decolonization. For example, while the UN General Assembly was initially dominated by Western states, by the 1960s, newly independent nations from Africa, Asia, and the Middle East had significantly altered the balance of power.

As more former colonies gained sovereignty and joined the UN, they began forming alliances that challenged the previous Western hegemonic influences towards a growing emphasis on the need to prioritize economic and social rights. Many postcolonial states viewed economic dependency, poverty, and underdevelopment as the most urgent human rights issues, arguing that state sovereignty and national development should take precedence over political freedoms. Hence, during the lead up to the conference, many rejected the Western focus on civil and political rights.

=== The United States and the Soviet Union ===
The United States and Soviet Union competed for influence over newly independent states, using human rights as part of their ideological battles. The U.S. championed civil and political rights, while the Soviet Union emphasized economic and social rights as a justification for state control. The Tehran Conference became a battleground for these competing visions, with postcolonial states largely aligning with the Soviet model.

== Key players ==
=== Western European and Others Group ===
One of the key players in the Tehran conference was the Western European and Others Group (WEOG). Key states involved were Australia, Canada, the UK and to a lesser extent the US. At the outset of the International Conference on Human Rights (1968), the Western European and Others Group (WEOG) saw the conference as an opportunity to strengthen the UN human rights system through structural reforms. These reforms aimed to restore credibility to the UN’s human rights framework and reinforce international oversight. WEOG nations sought to replace the UN Human Rights Commission (UNHRC) with a more effective Human Rights Council, as the UNHRC had increasingly been criticized for being overly politicized and ineffective in enforcing human rights standards. Another key reform was the establishment of a UN High Commissioner for Human Rights, who would serve as a central figure in human rights monitoring and advocacy. This position was intended to provide a stronger institutional mechanism for addressing human rights violations and ensuring global accountability. However, these reforms were quickly abandoned as it became evident that the conference’s agenda was dominated by Afro-Asian and Soviet-aligned states, which prioritized economic development, sovereignty, and anti-colonialism over individual civil and political rights and the establishment of new international human rights frameworks.

The Afro-Asians, in particular, are becoming increasingly restive about the situation in Southern Africa and it is not surprising that the Conference’s agenda (item 11 (a) and (b)), a copy of which is attached, concerns complex and controversial matters forWestern countries i.e., apartheid and colonialism. The inclusion of these particular topics in an agenda reviewing human rights progress over the last 20 years, and measures to be taken for the future, will pose a great challenge toWestern delegations in assisting the discussions to proceed constructively so that the Conference will realize the aim of constituting a major step forward in the advancement of human rights. – Secretary of State for External Affairs Paul Martin February 26, 1968.

=== Afro-Asian Bloc ===
The Afro-Asian block refers to the group of newly decolonized states in Africa, Asia, and the Middle East, which had become a significant force in the United Nations by the time of the Tehran conference in 1968. Western Powers, who held greater influence at the time of the UDHR, were now subject to demands and priorities of this assertive bloc. Even the venue of the conference being in Tehran was highly indicative of the Conference's motivations and the global human rights order at the time. At the time, Iran was under Shah Mohammad Reza Pahlavi’s leadership–an authoritarian ruler who emphasized desires to promote economic development and state modernization. As the host of the event, Shah Mohammad Reza Pahlavi took to the room and proposed great adjustments to the human rights legacy which were consistent with his “White Revolution” program which highlighted ideals such as socioeconomic prioritization, centralized states, and the necessity of state-led reforms to drive modernization and stability. Through his speech he decried the importance of political liberty and reaffirmed the importance of social and economic entitlements, arguing that “political democracy without economic democracy no longer [has] any true meaning”. These sentiments were shared among many attendees For instance, Diplomat Abdallahi Ould Erebih of Mauritania argued that international human rights documents failed to consider the unique challenges and well-known issues faced by developing countries. As well, the representative from Argentina shared that "that political democracy without economic democracy no longer had any true meaning”. The Afro-Asian bloc emphasized economic development and collective rights of the nation, contrasting the western centric focus on individual civil and political rights. They focused on Anti-Colonial issues such as; the struggle against colonialism, racial discrimination, slavery and apartheid.

=== Soviet Bloc ===
Human rights, especially political and civil rights, were a source of embarrassment for the Soviets. The Soviet Bloc was wary of the expansion of the UN human rights system, and they fought this expansion throughout the preparatory stages of the conference-except for cases related to race and apartheid. The Soviet Bloc opposed the Western European and Others Group (WEOG) reforms, particularly rejecting the establishment of a High Commissioner for Human Rights. The Soviets viewed the position as an intrusive power that could meddle in the internal affairs of states. They instead advocated for a committee of five commissioners, with one representative from each region of the world. The British and Ottawa viewed this as a tactic to hinder the advancement of human rights within the UN. At the same time, the Soviet Bloc sought to exploit anti-colonial politics for their own strategic interests, viewing the admission of newly decolonized states as an opportunity to counteract their own minority status within the UN. Despite initially agreeing to the Tehran Final Act, the Soviet Union ultimately distanced itself from adopting the Proclamation.

==== Proclamation of Tehran ====
To conclude the 1968 International Conference on Human Rights, on May 13, 1968, the Conference unanimously adopted the Proclamation of Tehran which can be found in the Final Act of the International Conference on Human Rights document. This document is a 55 page document composed of four chapters which outline the following:

1. The organization of the conference
2. The Proclamation of Tehran
3. Resolutions Adopted by the Conference
4. Signature of the Final Act of the Conference

The Proclamation of Teheran makes 19 distinct proclamations with regards to human rights. To illustrate, proclamations it makes the first three are:

1. It is imperative that the members of the international community fulfil their solemn obligations to promote and encourage respect for human rights and fundamental freedoms for all without distinctions of any kind such as race, colour, sex, language, religion, political or other opinions;
2. The Universal Declaration of Human Rights states a common understanding of the peoples of the world concerning the inalienable and inviolable rights of all members of the human family and constitutes an obligation for the members of the international community;
3. The International Covenant on Civil and Political Rights, the International Covenant on Economic, Social and Cultural Rights, the Declaration on the Granting of Independence to Colonial Countries and Peoples, the International Convention on the Elimination of All Forms of Racial Discrimination, as well as other conventions and declarations in the field of human rights adopted under the auspices of the United Nations, the -specialized agencies and the regional intergovernmental organizations, have created new standards and obligations to which States should conform;

The Proclamation of Teheran declares that the 1968 International Conference on Human Rights reaffirms its commitment to the principles of the Universal Declaration of Human Rights and other related international instruments. It also urges all peoples and governments to uphold these principles and strengthen their efforts to ensure that every individual enjoys a life rooted in freedom, dignity, and overall well-being, including physical, mental, social, and spiritual welfare.

== Legacy ==
=== A marginalized legacy and uncertain outcomes ===
The aftermath and legacy of the 1968 International Conference on Human Rights in Tehran are multifaceted and reflect broader significant shifts in post decolonization international relations. Although initially anticipated to be a momentous event, marking two decades since the Universal Declaration of Human Rights in 1968, the conference is largely viewed as a disappointment. Many of its outcomes fell short, and the resulting Tehran Proclamation is noted for addressing less than half of the rights laid out in the Universal Declaration, and in some respects, it appeared to limit rather than expand these rights.

The conference’s legacy is overshadowed by the more impactful 1993 World Conference on Human Rights in Vienna and is often omitted from comprehensive UN human rights compilations and literature. The scarcity of conference transcripts and related documents contributes to its marginal historical footprint.

=== Aftermath of the conference in the broader geopolitical context ===
The gathering, however, did underscore a noteworthy historical shift: the emergence of a Third World bloc asserting economic and social rights on the international stage. This new bloc challenged the Western-centric definition of human rights which largely focused on individual rights rather than national economic development in the context of decolonization. In that respect, the conference highlighted a realignment of power within the international system between traditional Western Powers and the Third World Bloc and revealed conflicting interests and human rights agenda.

When looking at the Conference’s legacy, a key question that arises is its contribution to the "human rights revolution" narrative, especially in the context of 1968 being declared the International Year of Human Rights.

In response to the perceived shortcomings of the Tehran conference, over 125 NGOs convened in Paris later in 1968 to strategize on promoting human rights. This meeting was pivotal as it laid the groundwork for an international NGO strategy, and it contributed to amplifying the role of non-governmental organizations in human rights advocacy and emphasizing national-level initiatives. UN Ambassador Richardson highlighted the necessity for greater NGO involvement, critiquing the state-centric approach to human rights promotion observed at Tehran, which also led to a subsequent crisis in human rights definition & understanding:

Tehran was our moment of truth, when we came face to face with the nature of our beast – when we saw what it means to be promoting the cause of Human Rights by working mainly through governments. Surely no one would have been taken by surprise at the results in Tehran.

== See also ==
- Vienna Declaration and Programme of Action
- International Covenant on Civil and Political Rights
- International Covenant on Economic, Social and Cultural Rights
- United Nations Human Rights Committee

== Bibliography ==
- Burke, Roland (2008). "From Individual Rights to National Development: The First UN International Conference on Human Rights, Tehran, 1968". Journal of World History. 19 (3): 275–296. ISSN 1045-6007.
- Jensen, Steven L. B., ed. (2016), ""So bitter a year for human rights": 1968 and the UNInternational Year for Human Rights", The Making of International Human Rights: The 1960s, Decolonization, and the Reconstruction of Global Values, Human Rights in History, Cambridge: Cambridge University Press, pp. 174–208, ISBN 978-1-107-53107-9, retrieved 2025-03-13
- Office of the High Commissioner for Human Rights (OHCHR). "From Tehran to Vienna: A Timeline." Retrieved 2025-03-11.
- Ramazani, Rouhollah K. (1974). "Iran's 'White Revolution': A Study in Political Development". International Journal of Middle East Studies. 5 (2): 124-139. ISSN 0020-7438.
- Thompson, Andrew S. (2015-01-02). "Tehran 1968 and Reform of the UN Human Rights System". Journal of Human Rights. 14 (1): 84-100. doi:10.1080/14754835.2014.987739. ISSN 1475-4835.
- United Nations. "International Conference on Human Rights, 1968." United Nations. Retrieved 2025-03-10.
- United Nations. "Document Viewer." docs.un.org. Retrieved 2025-03-11.
