= Annie Åkerhielm =

Swedish writer and journalist (1869–1966)

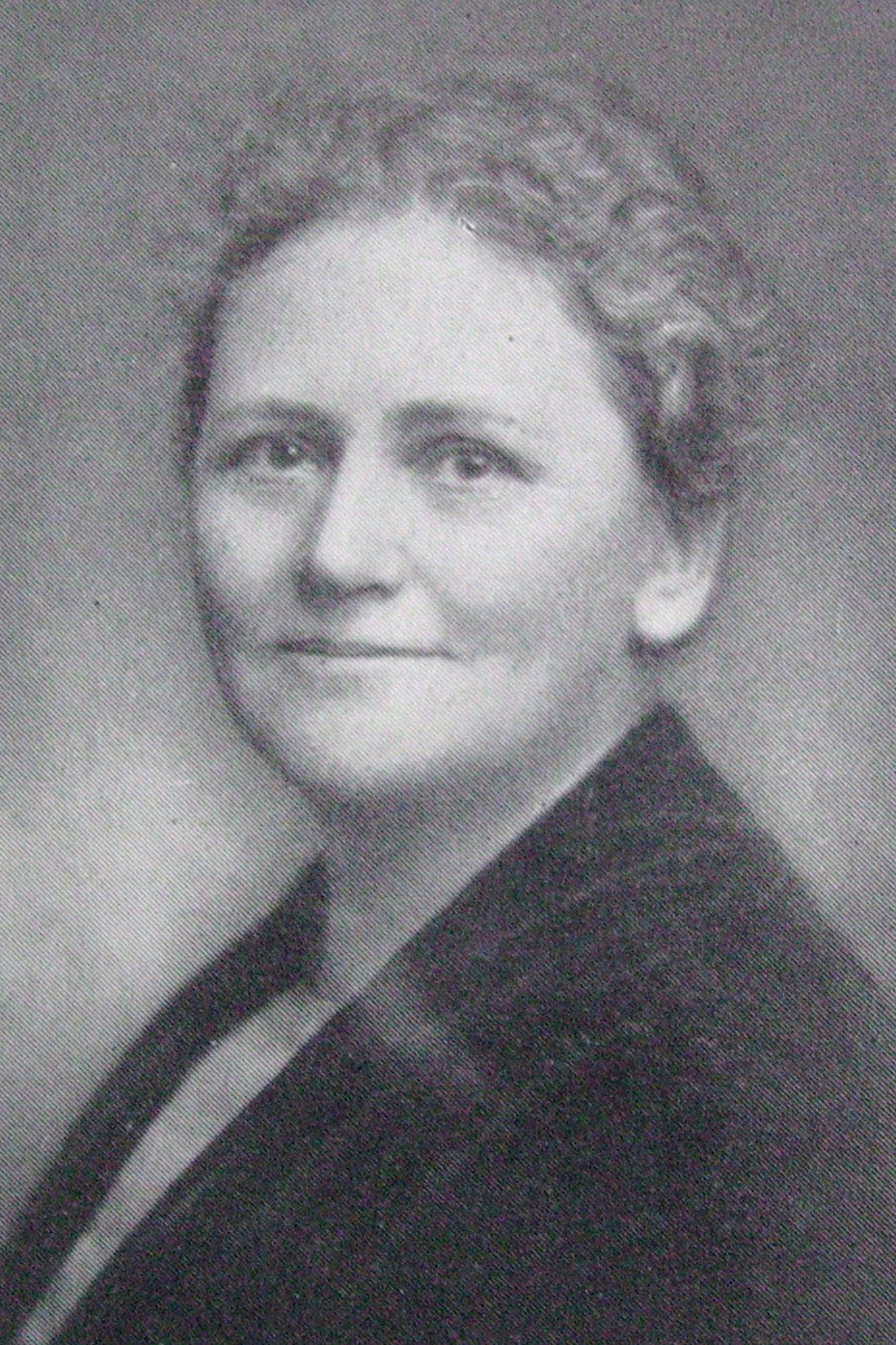
- Åkerhielm in 1959
- Born: Anna Vilhelmina Elisabet Quiding; 18 November 1869; Malmö, Sweden
- Died: 20 July 1956 (aged 86); Stockholm, Sweden
- Occupations: Writer; journalist
- Spouse: Dan Åkerhielm

Anna Vilhelmina Elisabet Åkerhielm (18 November 1869 – 20 July 1956) was a Swedish writer and journalist. She wrote numerous novels, as well as for Swedish newspapers throughout her career. Her 1900 verse novel Bröderna won her a Mindre guldmedaljen award from the Swedish Academy. Åkerhielm was known as an active campaigner against women's suffrage and democracy.

== Life ==
Annie Åkerhielm was born on 18 November 1869 in Malmö, Sweden. She was the second child of Catharina Quiding and Nils Herman Quiding, a district court judge, who was one of the leading utopian socialists of Sweden. Growing up in a remote and strict family, Åkerhielm lived a childhood of isolation. At this time, she read voraciously and acquired an interest in writing.

In 1898, Åkerhielm published her first novel Hvidehus, at the age of 29. The novel was influenced by Åkerhielm's anger over the Greco-Turkish War of 1897. It won the grand prize at Idun magazine's novel competition. Two more poetry collections followed in the next few years. She won the Mindre guldmedaljen award from the Swedish Academy for her verse novel Bröderna (1900). In 1901, she published the novel Ett främmande namn which was inspired by her travel to Greece. She wrote nearly 50 other novels in the following years with her last novel Katinka gör karriär, published in 1945.

Åkerhielm had an extremely productive literary career. She was hailed by contemporary critics for portraying the lives of people in her works. Her writings were recognised by publications such as Svenska Dagbladet, and by mainstream critics such as Carl David af Wirsén, and she was compared to literary author Selma Lagerlöf. Stockholms Dagblad praised Åkerhielm's boldness in voicing "old, old thoughts" in her novels.

Åkerhielm actively campaigned against women's suffrage and democracy, publishing the novel Fru Fanny, as well as the poetry Till Skånes kvinna, in 1904. She married Dan Åkerhielm, the editor-in-chief of the newspaper Gefle-Posten, in 1906. The marriage helped to initiate her career in journalism. She began working as a journalist for the newspaper, contributing articles on literary, political, and foreign scenes. In 1912, the couple moved to Stockholm, where they started working for the conservative newspaper Nya Dagligt Allehanda. Åkerhielm worked for the newspaper until her retirement in 1936. She expressed sympathy for Adolf Hitler, later calling him the saviour of Europe. She hoped that a new Hitler would take power in Europe one day.

Åkerhielm died in Stockholm, on 20 July 1956.
