= Marika Filippidou =

Greek stage actress, poet and journalist

- Μαρίκα Φιλιππίδου
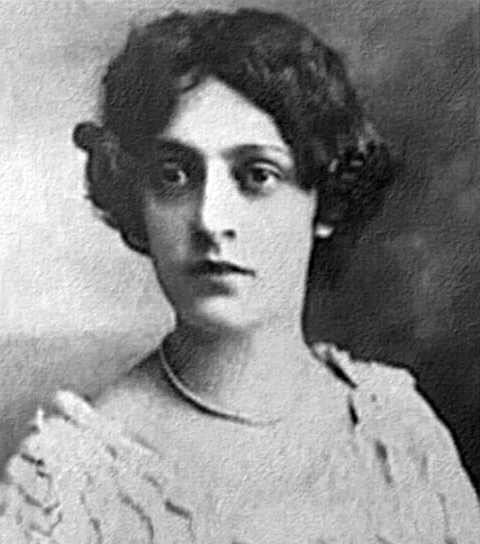
- Born: 1877; Constantinople, Ottoman Empire
- Died: Unknown
- Education: National and Kapodistrian University of Athens
- Occupations: Actress; Poet; Journalist
- Spouses: Kleon Triantafyllou (1910–1914); Stamatis Merkouris (m. 1914; later divorced)
- Writing career
- Notable works: Keladimata; Fotostephana; Marmaryges; founder of Neos Parthenon

Marika K. Filippidou (Greek: Μαρίκα K. Φιλιππίδου; born 1877) was a Greek stage actress, poet and journalist. She made her debut at Athens’s Royal Theatre in 1904 and subsequently trained at the Conservatoire de Paris. Filippidou published poetry and founded the magazine Neos Parthenon. During the interwar years she wrote anti-suffrage columns for Ellínis, and in 1910 married composer Attik, inspiring several of his waltzes.

== Early life and education ==
Marika K. Filippidou, born on 1877 in Constantinople to Pontic Greek parents from Trebizond and Chios, Filippidou was the daughter of actor Andreas Filippides and Fotini Dikaiou. She completed secondary school in Istanbul and then read law at the University of Athens, graduating in the early 1900s.

== Literary and theatrical career ==
While still a student in 1904, she made her stage debut in the chorus of Euripides’ Phoinissai at the Royal Theatre in Athens, performing alongside Marika Kotopouli and Aimilios Veakis. In 1907, she travelled to Paris for postgraduate legal studies but instead trained at the Conservatoire de Paris in voice and drama.

Beyond performance, Filippidou was a prolific poet: her first collection, Keladimata, was published in Athens in 1900, followed by Fotostephana and Marmaryges (the latter reissued in 1933).

In 1910, while in Paris, Filippidou married composer Kleon Triantafyllou (Attik). In 1911, his family’s fortunes collapsed, they returned permanently from Paris to Athens in severe financial distress, he supported the family entirely through his composing.

An incident occurred at Attik’s cabaret "Mantra" in 1930s Athens records that when Filippidou entered with her new husband, the audience clamoured for "Eida matia." Overcome, Attik left the piano in tears; ten minutes later he returned having composed on the spot the song "Zitate na sas po," which premiered to stunned silence.

=== Neos Parthenon ===
Neos Parthenon (Νέος Παρθενών) was a Greek-language, literary–philological weekly magazine published in Athens from 1900 to 1903. Under the direction of Filippidou, it appeared in a nationwide periodical press format, with all issues typewritten. Filippidou served as its founding editor. The publication provided literary and philological commentary with coverage across Greece.

Filippidou described her collaborators as "the most distinguished of our scholars and poets," with several pages reserved for specialised pedagogical studies. George Tolias (1997) notes that in its inaugural run in 1900, issues 17–18 carried Spyridon Deviazis’s article "Έλληνες Χαρτογράφοι κατά τον δέκατον έκτον αιώνα," marking one of the earliest Greek studies on Renaissance hydrographers.

In 1931 she refounded and edited the literary magazine, contributing poems and essays on Pontic themes.

=== Anti-suffrage writings ===
During the interwar period, Filippidou wrote a series of columns for the women’s journal Ellínis, arguing that politics was "a turbulent arena" at odds with women's "calm and composure," and claiming that enfranchisement would threaten Christian family ideals.

== Personal life ==
In 1910, while in Paris, Filippidou married composer Kleon Triantafyllou (Greek: Κλέων Τριανταφύλλου; stage name: Attik). He honoured her in 1911 by composing the waltz "Eida matia" for her. Their relationship inspired several of his most celebrated waltzes. Their union lasted four years; by 1914 she had left him for Lieutenant Stamatis Merkouris, later the father of actress Melina Mercouri.

Filippidou was described as beautiful, being dark-haired with light blue eyes.

== Selected works ==
=== Publications ===
- Filippidou, Marika K. (1921). Φωτοστέφανα [Photostefana]. Red Family Library. Τυπογραφείο Α. Δενάξα & Σία.
- Keladimata (poetry, 1900)
- Fotostephana (poetry)
- Marmaryges (poetry; reissued 1933)
- Νέος Παρθενών (literary magazine; founded 1931; poems and essays)

=== Filmography ===
Filmography
Title	Year	Role
The Uphill of Golgotha	1917	Actress
Agnoula	1939	Prostitute
Forgotten Faces	1946	Actress

== See also ==
- List of anti-suffragists
