= Gertrud Haldimann =

Swiss activist (1907–2001)

Gertrud Haldimann-Weiss (1907–2001), was a Swiss opponent of women's suffrage in Switzerland.

Haldimann was born as a daughter of a tinsmith and after her graduation from high school she studied pharmacy at the University of Bern graduating in 1931. Haldimann was the co-founder of the Frauenkomitees gegen die Einführung des Frauenstimmrechts in der Schweiz (English: Women's Committee against the introduction of women's suffrage in Switzerland) in 1958. The committee eventually established the Bund der Schweizerinnen gegen das Frauenstimmrecht (English: Federation of Swiss women against women's suffrage) in 1959 of which she was the first chairperson until 1967. Comparing Switzerland to other European countries in which women were allowed to vote, she defended the direct democracy of Switzerland and deemed the women's suffrage as impossible to coexist with it. In 1967 she resigned from the federation's presidency, with Ida Monn-Krieger succeeding her. But Haldimann stayed an active member of the federation and was elected the federations "Honorary President". Four days before the referendum, Haldimann took part in a panel in Wohlen which counted with representatives of several parties and Trudi Gerster, who was a member of the Grand Council of Basel and strongly supported the women's suffrage.

Gertrud Haldimann married to Carl Haldimann and had six children.
