= World Conference on Human Rights =

First human rights conference

The World Conference on Human Rights was held by the United Nations in Vienna, Austria, on 14 to 25 June 1993. It was the first human rights conference held since the end of the Cold War. The main result of the conference was the Vienna Declaration and Programme of Action.

== Background ==
Although the United Nations had long been active in the field of human rights, the Vienna conference was only the second global conference to focus exclusively on human rights, with the first having been the International Conference on Human Rights held in Teheran, Iran, during April–May 1968 to mark the twentieth anniversary of the Universal Declaration of Human Rights.

The Vienna conference came at a time when world conferences were popular, with the United Nations Conference on Environment and Development having been held in Rio de Janeiro, Brazil, in June 1992, and the International Conference on Population and Development in Cairo, Egypt, soon following in September 1994. More conferences would follow after that, including the World Summit for Social Development in Copenhagen, Denmark, in March 1995 and the Fourth World Conference on Women in Beijing, China, in September 1995. Such conferences were seen as a way to promote global participation, consultation, and policy formation, and were seen as a likely significant new way to influence the direction of international society.

The notion of having a world conference on human rights was first proposed in 1989. The end of the Cold War brought about the hope that the long stalemate and distortion of United Nations behaviors due to the bipolar superpower confrontation would cease.

In the run-up to the 1993 conference, much of the optimism of the 1989 era was lost. Preparatory conferences were held in Geneva, Switzerland, beginning in 1991, as were a number of regional and satellite meetings. These struggled to produce new ideas that countries could agree upon, and highlighted differences surrounding the role of state sovereignty, non-governmental organizations (NGOs), and whether new or strengthened human rights instruments for the UN were feasible and impartial. The United Nations General Assembly was eventually forced to decide upon the conference's agenda in 1992. Pierre Sané, the Secretary General of Amnesty International, was concerned that conference might represent a backwards step for human rights. He added, "It's not surprising that governments are not overenthusiastic. After all, they are the ones violating human rights."

== Conference ==
The World Conference on Human Rights was attended by representatives of 171 states and 800 NGOs, with some 7,000 participants overall. This made it the largest gathering ever on human rights. It was organised by Human Rights expert John Pace.

There was much discussion ahead of the conference on what could and could not be said during it. The rules adopted stated that no specific countries or places could be mentioned where human rights abuses were taking place, including those involved in current conflicts such as Bosnia and Herzegovina, Angola, and Liberia, and those subject to ongoing human rights criticism, such as China and Cuba. Instead, human rights abuses were to be discussed in the abstract only; this led The New York Times to state that the conference was taking place "In an atmosphere strangely removed from reality." In particular, that the ongoing Bosnian War was taking place only an hour's flight from Vienna testified dramatically that no new era of international cooperation had come into place.

Despite the rules, organizations and demonstrators at the conference's physical site were happy to mention specific ongoing abuses all around the world, with many displaying atrocity photographs in an attempt to out-do each other. One person concerned about the Polisario Front and Western Sahara situation said, "It's hard to be noticed."

The conference did have an expansive view of human rights, with efforts made to highlight women's rights, indigenous peoples' rights, minority rights, and more in the context of universal political and economic rights. Women's rights in particular gained a strong and effective presence at the conference.

One fault line at the conference was Western nations who proclaimed a universal meaning to human rights versus nations who said that human rights needed to be interpreted differently in non-Western cultures and that attempts to impose a universal definition amounted to interference in their internal affairs. The latter group was led by China, Syria and Iran, and also included a number of Asian nations such as Singapore, Malaysia, Indonesia, and Vietnam. On the opening day of the conference, U.S. Secretary of State Warren Christopher spoke out strongly against this notion, saying "We cannot let cultural relativism become the last refuge of repression."

Former U.S. House of Representatives member and vice presidential candidate Geraldine Ferraro attended the conference as the alternate U.S. delegate, and was one of the attendees heavily interested in women's rights aspects.

In spite of pressures from the People's Republic of China, the 14th Dalai Lama was able to give a talk at the conference on human responsibilities.

== Results ==
The key result of the World Conference on Human Rights was the Vienna Declaration and Programme of Action, which was formulated late in the meeting and was adopted by consensus of 171 states on 25 June 1993. While one possible interpretation sees this document as a "well crafted but empty exhortation", it did come to represent as much of a consensus as could be found on human rights in the early 1990s. And it did in fact set new marks in human rights work in several areas. It established the interdependence of democracy, economic development, and human rights. Specifically, it replaced the Cold War division of Civil and Political Rights (CPR) apart from Economic Social and Cultural rights (ESCR) with the concept of rights being indivisible (one cannot take one type of rights without the other), interdependent (one set of rights needs the other to be realised), and inter-related (that all human rights relate to each other). It called for the creation of instruments to publicize and protect the rights of women, children, and indigenous peoples. It requested more funding for the United Nations Center for Human Rights. Most significantly, it called for a new office, the United Nations High Commissioner for Human Rights.

The United Nations General Assembly subsequently endorsed the declaration as part of Resolution 48/121. It also created the post of United Nations High Commissioner for Human Rights on 20 December 1993.

By the early 2000s, all of the explicit establishments recommended by the Vienna Declaration and Programme of Action had been met in full or in part. The conference also highlighted the importance that NGOs would continue to play in the human rights infrastructure.
