= Pipina Vallosi =

Greek journalist, essayist, and philanthropist (1850–1913)

- Πιποίνα Βαλλώση
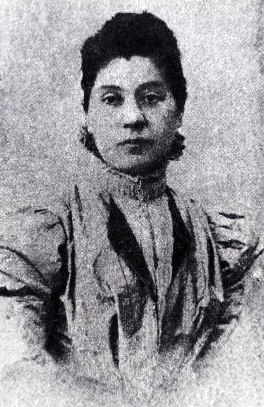
- Born: 20 January 1850; Nafplio, Kingdom of Greece
- Died: 17 October 1913 (aged 63); Athens, Kingdom of Greece
- Occupation: Journalist · Essayist · Columnist · Philanthropist
- Known for: Author of the inaugural lead article “Η γυνή εν τη οικογενεία” promoting traditional gender roles
- Title: Chief columnist of Η Οικογένεια
- Movement: Conservatism · Anti-suffragism

Pipina D. Vallosi (Greek: Πιποίνα Βαλλώση; 20 January 1850 – 17 October 1913) was a Greek journalist, conservative magazine editor and philanthropist. She edited Η Οικογένεια (The Family), a periodical launched in 1897.

== Biography ==
Pipina D. Vallosi was born in Nafplio on 20 January 1850.

=== Philanthropic activity ===
Vallosi was a principal initiator of the Asylum for the Incurables (Ασύλον τῶν Ἀνιάτων) in Athens and, during 1893–94, served on its founding council, playing a key role in its organization, governance, and charitable mission.

At the Sunday School (Κυριακό Σχολείο) in Athens, an initiative by the Women's Association for Women's Education (Σύλλογος Κυριών υπέρ της Γυναικείας Παιδεύσεως) that provided free elementary classes to working-class and impoverished women, Vallosi served as a volunteer instructor. She is listed in the inaugural teaching roster of 1894, where she taught religious instruction alongside the Association's founder, journalist Kalliroi Parrén.

Vallosi was appointed Ephor (Curator) of the Athens Central Section of the Ladies’ Association "Ergani Athina" where she coordinated the receipt, cataloguing, and preservation of all provincial entries for the 1898 Pan‑Hellenic Exhibition of Women's Handicraft in Agrinion, guaranteeing each textile and lacework piece arrived intact and was exhibited to optimal effect. They also raised relief funds, through a 50 000‑ticket lottery it collected 49,000 drachmas, which were distributed to the families of reservists serving in the 1897 war.

=== Journalism ===
==== Ladies' Newspaper ====
She began her journalistic career in the 1880s, contributing essays to Εφημερίς των Κυριών (Ladies' Newspaper). Such as an article titled "The present woman and her duty" («Η σημερινή γυνή και το εαυτής καθήκον»), which was published in 1887; specifically in issue 7, page 5, and issue 8, pages 5–6.

In her article, Vallosi distinguished family-based upbringing from formal education outside the home. She saw domestic training as foundational, teaching girls essential household skills, needlework, and moral values. Formal education, however, provided intellectual and artistic opportunities beyond domestic boundaries. Vallosi championed a well-rounded approach, integrating physical, spiritual, and intellectual growth. She regarded physical education, including gymnastics, as ethically fundamental, not merely decorative, supporting moral and intellectual progress. While affirming domestic education as an important first step, Vallosi encouraged women to further their formal education in science and the arts, reflecting her belief in their intellectual potential and ability to surpass traditional limitations. Central to her philosophy was the concept of personal responsibility in women's education.

==== The Family ====
The Family (Η Οικογένεια Εβδομαδιαίον Γυναικείον Περιοδικόν) was launched in Athens on 4 January 1897 as a weekly women's magazine. It was founded and edited by Anna Serouïou (1856–1917) in deliberate opposition to the liberal Εφημερίς των Κυριών (1887) of Kallirrhoe Parren. The theme of magazine focused on domestic economy, child‑rearing and moral education. From its first issue it solicited contributions from both male and female intellectuals to project a conservative counter‑voice to the emerging women's emancipation movement. The magazine positioned itself alongside contemporaneous outlets such as the Constantinopolitan Βοσπορίς within a broader "anti‑emancipation" press.

The editorial line of Οικογένεια emphasized a classical, anti‑Western stance, urging a return to traditional Greek mores and the ideal of domestic womanhood. The inaugural issue featured the lead article "The Woman in the Family" (Η γυνή εν τη οικογενείᾳ) by Pipina Vallosi, in which Vallosi argued that “the natural calling of woman is the quiet, restful, domestic life, not the ever‑moving, turbulent, public one". Furthermore, Vallosi asserted that "woman’s natural field of activity is the household", repeating the maxim "Men make the laws, women make the morals". She argued that women's emotional nature rendered them unfit for political judgment. Her stance was echoed by educator Vlasios Skordelis, who held that female education should be "entirely national and religious". Other early contributors included Alkminē Koukou (issue 1), Anna Serouïou herself (issue 5, 1 February 1897), and Charikleia Melandinou (issue 13, 29 March 1897), alongside various lecturers and figures from Athenian society.

== Death and legacy ==
Vallosi died in Athens on 17 October 1913.

A zincograph portrait is preserved in the Sgourdaíos–Vláchos Library and was reproduced in Ποικίλη Στοά (1914).

Vallosi's anonymous obituary in Poikili Stoá (Vol. 16, 1914) honored her vital contributions during the Greco‑Turkish War of 1897 and her foundational role in establishing the Asylum for the Incurables. Several articles and studies she authored further showcased her blend of hands‑on philanthropy and intellectual advocacy in print.

== Selected works ==
- «Η γυνή εν τη οικογενεία» (“The Woman in the Family”), 1897
- «Η σημερινή γυνή και το εαυτής καθήκον» (“The Modern Woman and Her Duty”), 1887

== See also ==
- List of anti-suffragists
