= Ida Monn-Krieger =

Swiss anti–suffragist (1916 – 1970)

Ida Monn-Krieger (1916 – 1970) was a Swiss anti-Suffragette and president of the Federation of Swiss women against women's suffrage.

== Early life and education ==
Ida Monn-Krieger was born in Wolhusen in Canton Lucerne in 1916. She attended high school in Lucerne from which she graduated with a Matura. She then studied for half a year at the housekeeping school in Neuchatel and another half a year at the social women school in Lucerne. In 1937 she married Anton Monn, an educator and banker.

== Anti-Suffraggete ==
In hindsight of a referendum on women's voting rights in 1959, the Committee of Swiss Women against women's suffrage was founded in 1958. Out of this committee, a Federation of Swiss women against women's suffrage was established following the defeat of the suffragists in the referendum on women's suffrage in 1959. Ida Monn-Krieger was an co-founder of the committee and the secretary of the federation since 1959. Its first president was Getrud Haldimann, who resigned in 1967, following which Monn-Krieger succeeded her. According to Isabelle Dahinden she feared the loss of the traditional role model of the women. She saw a women's role at home where she is supposed to raise the children. In a letter to the teacher of her daughter, Monn-Krieger tried to compel the teacher of the disadvantages of women's suffrage. The teacher would eventually become a Grand Councilor of Lucerne. She died in December 1970, before women's suffrage was approved in a referendum in 1971.
