= Mrs. H. D. Warren =

Canadian Philanthropist (1862–1952)

Sarah Trumbull Warren
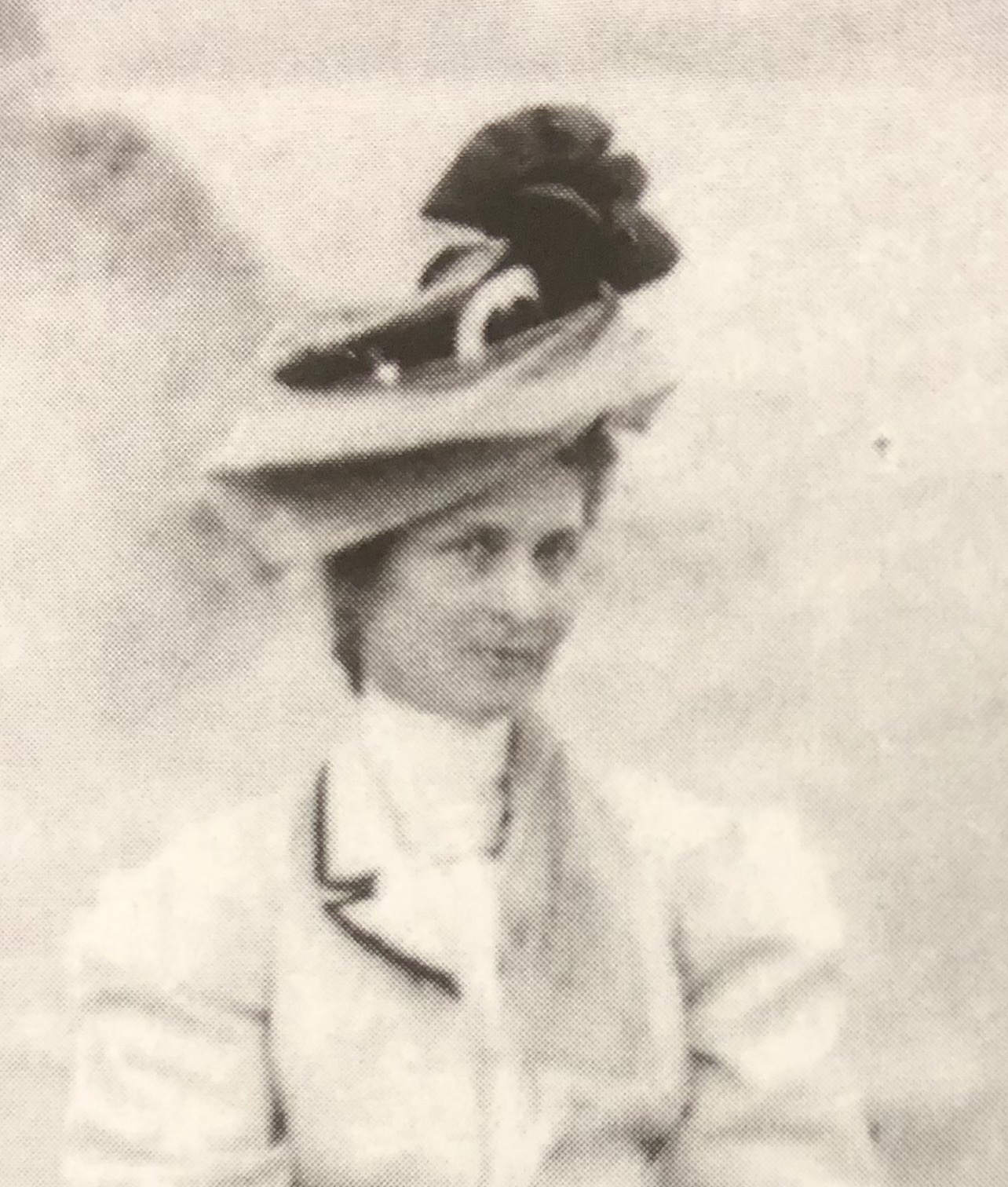
- Born: Sarah Trumbull Van Lennep; 1862; Orange, New Jersey, United States
- Died: January 7, 1952 (aged 89); Toronto, Ontario, Canada
- Known for: Philanthropy; Founding member, Royal Ontario Museum Board of Trustees (1914–1952); Founding supporter, University of Toronto Department of Social Work; Major donor, Royal Ontario Museum and Art Gallery of Ontario; Leadership in women’s organizations (Canadian Girl Guides, Women’s Patriotic League in Toronto during World War II); Association Opposed to Woman Suffrage in Canada (1913–1917)
- Spouse: Herbert Dudley Warren (m. 1885)
- Awards: CBE (1905); Lady of Grace, Order of St John (1917); LL.D. (1933)

Mrs. H. D. Warren (born: Sarah Trumbull Van Lennep; 1862 – January 7, 1952) was an American-born Canadian philanthropist, museum trustee, and social welfare advocate. A key figure in Toronto's cultural and social development, she was a founding member of the Royal Ontario Museum (ROM) Board of Trustees, serving from 1914 to 1952 as its first female trustee, and a major donor to the ROM and the Art Gallery of Ontario. Warren co-founded the University of Toronto's Department of Social Work, led the Canadian Girl Guides as chief commissioner from 1922 to 1941, and presided over the Women's Patriotic League in Toronto during World War II. She received the Order of the British Empire in 1905, the Lady of Grace of the Order of St John in 1917, and an honorary LL.D. from the University of Toronto in 1933.

== Biography ==
=== Early life ===
Sarah Van Lennep was born in Orange, New Jersey in 1862, of an established family in New England that was of Dutch descent (said to reach back to 1330) intermingled with European nobility. She was an eminent philanthropist when she married Harry Dorman Warren, the first president of Gutta Percha & Rubber, Ltd. (later, the Dominion Rubber Company), in June 1885. They came to Canada in 1887. After the death of her husband in 1909, Mrs. Warren assumed his position as chairman of the board of directors.

=== Philanthropic activity ===
She was involved in a number of philanthropic endeavours in Toronto. In 1911, Mrs. Warren was the first female trustee of the Royal Ontario Museum and its first vice-chairman. She also was the only female member of the board of trustees and donated regularly to the museum as one of its most reliable benefactors. In 1914, she gave the ROM the 11th century The figure of a luohan, from China, one of the treasures of the museum and permanently on view. She also gave the museum a collection of Chinese porcelain. Along with Sigmund Samuel and others, she also helped the director of the museum, Charles Trick Currelly, providing him with a protective safety net for purchases when he overextended his budget. Together with Samuel, she was one of the founders of Ten Friends for the Arts (for the ROM) as well as being one of the founders of the Art Gallery of Ontario (then the Art Gallery of Toronto). Currelly mentions the important role she played in many places in his book, I brought the Ages Home. Mrs. Warren was considered so helpful by the Museum that she even had a dinosaur named after her, the Parksosaurus warrenae.

Among her other charities, she assisted in the founding of the Department of Social Work at the University of Toronto by donating the funds needed to pay for the salary of a director. She was, of course, kept in touch with the person chosen. In 1914, the Department of Social Service (which is now the Factor-Inwentash Faculty of Social Work) was established, making it the first school of social work in Canada. She also encouraged the Canadian Girl Guides (an outgrowth of the Boy Scout movement) as one of the Canadian Council of statutory incorporators. She became the head of the organization in 1922 and remained chief commissioner for almost twenty years. In 1938, she gave her home at 95 Wellesley Street East to become the headquarters for the Red Cross. During World War II, she was president of the Women's Patriotic League in Toronto which assisted in social work and ran an emergency workroom with various functions, among them ties to Social Services. Although she believed in education for women, she did not believe in universal suffrage. In 1913, Warren co-founded and presided over the Association Opposed to Woman Suffrage in Canada, but she supported women's suffrage after its enactment in 1917. Philanthropy provided her with a way to have certain aspects of power in society at a time when women were excluded from politics.

Warren belonged to many clubs; she was a life member of the Women's Art Association and the Royal Canadian Institute.

== Honours and personal Life ==
Recognized for her contributions to public service and war relief efforts, she was appointed Commander of the British Empire (CBE) in 1905 and later received the Lady of Grace insignia from the Hospital of St. John of Jerusalem in 1917 for her First World War service. In 1933, the University of Toronto awarded her an honorary Doctor of Laws (LL.D.).

In her personal life, she was the mother of five children. Her daughter, Helen Huntington Warren (1889–1982), married Charles S. Band, and together they built a significant collection of Canadian art, including Emily Carr's The Indian Church. The collection was donated to the Art Gallery of Ontario in 1969. Her son, Frederick Turnbull Warren, was killed at Ypres during the First World War.
