= Association Opposed to Woman Suffrage in Canada =

Canadian anti-suffrage organization

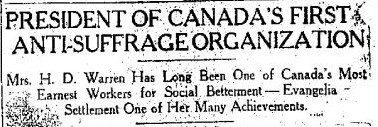
- Lethbridge Herald, profile, June 17, 1914
- Formation: 1913; 113 years ago
- Founder: Sarah Warren
- Dissolved: 1917; 109 years ago (de facto)
- Type: Non-governmental organization
- Headquarters: Toronto, Ontario
- Official language: English
- President: Sarah Trumbull Van Lennep (Mrs. H. D. Warren)
- Vice-President: Alice Evelyn Dent (Mrs. H. S. Strathy)
- Vice-President: Miss Campbell
- Secretary: Mary Grier

The Association Opposed to Woman Suffrage in Canada (AOWSC) formed in 1913, it was established to provide a platform for those who believe that granting women the parliamentary franchise would be contrary to the best interests of the state. While it actively engages in civic, social, and moral reform, the organization maintains that such goals are better pursued without extending voting rights to women. It is the first and only organization in Canada, notably in located in Ontario, advocating for anti-suffragism.

== History ==
=== Background ===
Between 1872 and 1917, opposition to women's suffrage, especially in Ontario came from both men and women who believed that granting women the vote would negatively affect society. These views played a key role in shaping the broader discourse around suffrage in the province. Early resistance was primarily led by men, drawing heavily on the ideas of figures such as Goldwin Smith and Andrew Macphail. Over time, however, leadership of the anti-suffrage movement shifted to women, beginning with Clementina Fessenden (1843–1918) in Hamilton. This trend culminated in the founding of the Association Opposed to Woman Suffrage in Canada in 1913.

=== Organization ===
The Association Opposed to Woman Suffrage in Canada (AOWSC) was led by elite Canadian women who argued that granting women the parliamentary vote would undermine the state’s stability. Headed by Sarah Warren, a wealthy Toronto widow active in the Girl Guides, Spadina Lodge for Working Girls, and the Royal Ontario Museum, the group primarily consisted of married women who did not work outside the home, often relatives of politicians and industrialists. Key leaders included Sarah Trumbull Van Lennep (Mrs. H. D. Warren) as president, vice-presidents Miss Campbell, Mrs. H. S. Strathy (Alice Evelyn Dent), and Mrs. H. C. Rae, with Miss Barron as treasurer, Miss Laing as recording secretary, and Miss Plummer as corresponding secretary.

Mary Elizabeth Plummer, daughter of Dominion Steel’s president, articulated AOWSC’s mission to oppose suffrage, stating it provided a platform for those who believed suffrage would harm the state’s interests and that civic, social, and moral reforms were better advanced without women’s parliamentary franchise. Herbert Mowat, a lawyer and Ontario Supreme Court justice, also spoke to the group, reinforcing the anti-suffrage stance. The association organized events, such as four lectures at Guild Hall in Toronto, including one by British author John Cowper Powys, to counter suffragist arguments from groups like the Manitoba Political Equality League and the Women’s Christian Temperance Union. According to the Ontario Historical Society (1965), during its peak, the Association Opposed to Woman Suffrage in Canada had, for several years, sponsored public meetings and distributed pamphlets to promote its views.

William H. Hearst, Ontario's premier from 1914 to 1919, initially a conservative opponent of women’s suffrage, aligned with the AOWSC’s views early in his premiership. However, he shifted his stance by 1917, when his government passed legislation granting women the vote in Ontario, making it the fifth province to do so.

Prominent members like Alice Evelyn Dent, a noted philanthropist and horticulturist, and Mary Grier, the association’s secretary, bolstered AOWSC’s respectability. Mrs. J. H. Burnham, another president, publicly warned that women’s suffrage could disrupt family roles and national unity. Despite initial momentum, AOWSC’s influence waned during the First World War as members shifted focus to war work, and their arguments grew increasingly outdated. According to the Toronto Star, Suffragists also disrupted AOWSC meetings, further challenging their efforts.

== Stance ==
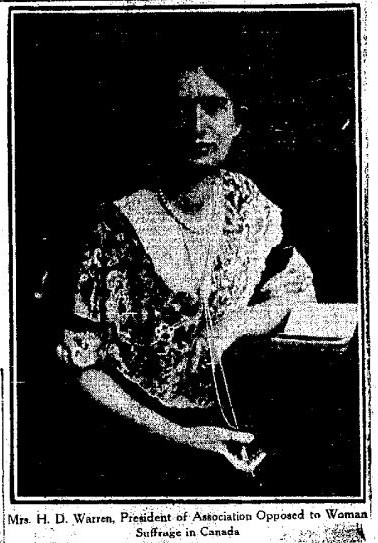
Sarah Trumbull (Van Lennep) Warren, c. 1914, as she appears in Lethbridge Herald

Warren holds that women derived significant influence through traditional roles and questioned the necessity or benefit of political participation. In her view, "by marriage a woman gains much" while she may "gradually lose in some things," and she believed that suffrage did not substantially improve conditions for women, even in countries where it was fully implemented.

Warren argued that political engagement would divert women’s "strength and vitality from the duties in which it is so much needed." She maintained that women already exercised "more and more exact influence for good on the life of the country" without entering the political sphere, which she described as “the physically trying uncertainty of politics.”

Under her leadership, the Association promoted the belief that expanding suffrage would disrupt societal harmony by removing women from their "special qualifications" and traditional contributions. The organization "necessarily held a negative position" and viewed its role as bearing witness to whether suffrage would "confirm or condemn their principle of limited suffrage."

Warren also asserted that “in the rise and fall of nations women have never used nor wasted their votes, and with the same result as now.” While acknowledging some good might come from female political involvement, she contended that "the influence of women in public life brings no signal advantages with it." Instead, she emphasized maintaining "the traditional woman nature," which she described as “the conserving moral and spiritual forces” necessary “to maintain a harmonious civilization.” She concluded that societal good would only come “by nature, not by artificializing of human nature.”
