= Federation of Swiss women against women's suffrage =

Association that campaigned against women's suffrage in Switzerland

The Federation of Swiss Women Against Women's Suffrage was founded in 1959 after a referendum in 1959 in which a vote was held to prevent women from voting. Only men were able to vote in the referendum. Its first president was Gertrud Haldimann. Ida Monn-Krieger succeeded her in 1967. It disestablished itself after a referendum in 1971, in which women's suffrage was approved.

== Background ==
Over twenty cantonal referendums on women's suffrage were held between 1919 and 1959 in which only men were allowed to vote and each time women were denied the right to vote. In 1957, the all-male Federal Council (the Swiss Government) began to support women suffrage, but claimed women were not disadvantaged in Swiss society. In view of a referendum on women's suffrage in 1959, a group of anti-suffragists convened in Lucerne in June 1958 and founded a "Committee for action against women's suffrage" under the lead of Josefine Steffen-Zehnder. In their first meeting, they renamed themselves the "Committee of Swiss women against women's suffrage". The committee of Swiss women held several meetings ahead of the referendum of 1959 to discuss campaign tactics. National Councillor (MP) Karl Hackhofer from the Christian Democratic People's Party (CVP) also attended those meetings. In September 1958, cantonal branches were planned won being established in the cantons of Thurgau, Zurich, Schaffhausen and the cantons of central Switzerland. But in most of the cantons only a few women were active anti-suffragists and the branches seemed to have existed mostly in theory. The one in Schaffhausen seemed to have disestablished itself following the referendum.

=== 1959 referendum on women's suffrage ===
For the national referendum on women's suffrage in 1959, the Social Democratic Party (SP) and the Alliance of Independents both supported the yes campaign. The result was that about 66% of the men said no to women suffrage. Only the three French speaking cantons, Vaud, Neuchâtel and Geneva approved women's suffrage in the referendum in 1959. Vaud and Neuchâtel introduced it the same year, Geneva in 1960.

== Establishment ==
Following the electoral success in the referendum of 1959, from the committee of Swiss women against women's suffrage, the Federation of Swiss women against women's suffrage was founded in May 1959. As its first president Gertrud Haldimann was elected.

=== Cantonal branches ===
A branch for Lucerne was established on 4 June 1959, another for Berne followed on the 29 June. The one in Zurich followed in January 1960, in Solothurn a section was founded in June 1961. The names of the presidencies in the cantonal branches were often the same as the ones of the national federation. In Solothurn, the sister of Gertrud Haldimann was made the sections president. The branch in Lucerne was mostly inactive following the death of its president Josefine Steffen-Zehnder. Neither in Schaffhausen or in the cantons of central Switzerland, the Federation was able to recruit enough willing members. In 1968, Gertrud Haldimann acknowledged that in all cantonal branches, there were only a few active members and it had been difficult to recruit new ones from the start.

== Arguments ==
The federation was against what they called the "wrong rights". They reasoned that whilst men did have to serve in the military and women did not, men were able to vote and women did not. Or they argued that even though there were a few women who were interested in politics (like themselves), in total there were not that many. The few interested ones were deemed overly educated, and therefore incapable to represent the needs of the average Swiss woman. Another argument was that a good mother had more power than a suffragette.

=== 1971 referendum on women's suffrage ===
In the national referendum on women's suffrage on 7 February 1971 only held for men, it was approved with 65.7%. The result was also the end of the Federation of Swiss women against women's suffrage.
