= Mary Plummer (Canadian Army officer) =

Canadian Army officer and humanitarian (c. 1877–1955)

Mary Elizabeth Plummer
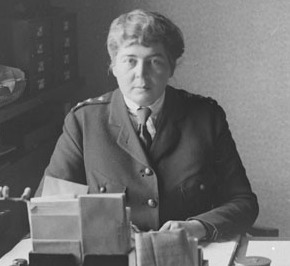
- Plummer in uniform
- Born: c. 1877; Ottawa, Ontario, Canada
- Died: January 11, 1955 (aged 78) Toronto, Ontario, Canada
- Allegiance: Canada
- Branch: Canadian Expeditionary Force — Canadian Field Comforts Commission
- Service years: 1914–1919
- Rank: Honorary Captain
- Commands: Canadian Field Comforts Commission (1914–1919)
- Conflicts: Home-front support, First World War
- Awards: Brought to notice of the Secretary of State for War (7 Aug 1917; 23 Mar 1919)
- Other work: Author of fundraising book With the First Canadian Contingent (1915); organiser of veterans’ welfare projects

Mary Elizabeth Plummer (c. 1877 – 11 January 1955) was a Canadian organiser, wartime administrator and fundraiser. She is best remembered for founding and directing the Canadian Field Comforts Commission (CFCC) during the First World War, a volunteer service that supplied Canadian soldiers overseas with clothing, reading matter and other "comforts." Her work earned her an honorary captaincy in the Canadian Army Medical Corps and formal commendations from the British War Office.

Born in Ottawa to banker and industrialist James Henry Plummer and Annie (McConkey) Plummer, she first rose to national prominence in August 1914 by galvanising a cross-country appeal that financed a Canadian hospital ship and new wards at Haslar Naval Hospital in Portsmouth, England. Once in Britain with the first Canadian contingent, she established the CFCC depot at Shorncliffe Army Camp and managed its operations for the duration of the war, later publishing With the First Canadian Contingent (1915) to support the cause.

After the armistice, Plummer remained active in patriotic and youth organisations: she served as a councillor of the Imperial Order Daughters of the Empire, directed camp libraries for the Girl Guides of Canada and, during the Second World War, returned overseas to set up mobile libraries and comfort services for the Canadian Active Service Force until illness forced her repatriation. From 1914 to 1917 she also acted as corresponding secretary of the Association Opposed to Woman Suffrage in Canada, articulating the group’s case against extending the federal franchise to women. Plummer spent her final years in Toronto, where she died in 1955 and was buried in St James Cemetery.

== Early life ==
Mary Elizabeth Plummer was born c. 1877 in Ottawa, Ontario, to James Henry Plummer, a prominent banker and president of Dominion Steel Corporation, and Annie McConkey Plummer. She was one of seven children, including brothers Thomas Herman, Maurice Vernon, and Charles Hammond Ford, and a sister named Joyce; one sibling died in childhood.

== World War I fundraising ==
On August 3, 1914, Plummer, then in Victoria, British Columbia, sent a telegram to the Daughters of the Empire in Toronto, urging the organization to mobilize across Canada for the purpose of supporting a Hospital Ship in response to the outbreak of World War I.

The first meeting for war purposes in Toronto was held on August 4, 1914, at the home of Mrs. A. E. Gooderham, in response to Plummer’s telegram. On August 6, a second meeting was held where the women decided to organize the Hospital Ship initiative as a collective offering from the Women of Canada, rather than any specific organization. The fundraising goal was set at $100,000 but ultimately surpassed expectations, raising $284,000.

$100,000 was given to the British War Office for Canadian Women's Ambulances. The remaining $184,000 funded a group of buildings at the Hasler Naval Hospital in Portsmouth, England. Plummer served as Secretary for this major fundraising and organizational effort, with all executive work managed by Toronto women.

== World War I service ==
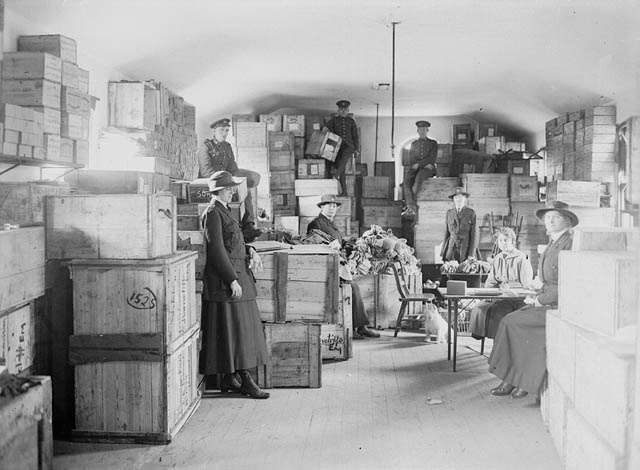
Canadian Field Comforts Commission, at work in Shorncliffe, England, 1916

Plummer and Joan Arnoldi recognized early on that soldiers would require more than weapons and uniforms, they would need warmth, morale, and reminders of home. Both women, members of the Women's Patriotic League, visited Valcartier, Quebec, where the Canadian Expeditionary Force (CEF) was training, to assess how comforts were being handled. Finding the system lacking, they lobbied the Minister of Militia and Defence, Sam Hughes, to support a dedicated organization for comfort distribution. Hughes agreed, and the Canadian Field Comforts Commission CFCC was created with official army recognition.

In September 1914, at the age of 37, Plummer enlisted with the CFCC. She was appointed to the CFCC with the rank of lieutenant and sailed to England with the First Canadian Contingent. Plummer established a CFCC depot at Shorncliffe Army Camp near Salisbury Plain, where Canadian soldiers were based. There, she coordinated the distribution of donated items, such as socks, underwear, tobacco, books, and sweets, to troops at the front. Her work was crucial in maintaining morale among the troops, providing them with a sense of connection to their families and communities back home. Plummer is named as one of the two overseas representatives (alongside Lieutenant Joan Arnoldi) for the Red Cross Committee’s efforts.

Under Plummer’s leadership, the CFCC operated with a small team of civilian women and a few male soldiers. Over the next four years, they managed the collection, sorting, packaging, and distribution of large volumes of comforts to front-line troops. About 60% of shipments were general supplies, while 40% were targeted to specific units.

Her dedication and organizational skills led to her promotion to temporary honorary captain in August 1916. This honorary appointment was in the Canadian Army Medical Corps. Plummer’s efforts were officially recognized when she was brought to the notice of the Secretary of State for War for valuable services in August 1917 and again in March 1919.

In addition to her logistical role, Plummer contributed to fundraising efforts, including the publication of With the First Canadian Contingent, a book she authored in 1915 to raise funds for the CFCC. The book, featuring her photographs and soldiers’ letters, sold 18,000 copies, with profits supporting the commission’s work.

Despite her contributions, some critics labeled the women as "imposters." In response, Colonel Walter Gow, Deputy Minister for Overseas Military Forces, defended them, asserting that their uniformed service deserved formal recognition given their contribution.

Plummer was formally released from military service on November 4, 1919 as part of the general demobilization of Canadian forces following the conclusion of the First World War. A Certificate of Service, issued on January 30, 1920 in Ottawa.

== Anti-suffrage involvement ==
Between 1914 and 1917, Plummer was a corresponding secretary of the Association Opposed to Woman Suffrage in Canada (AOWSC), she described the organization's purpose as providing a platform for those who believed that granting women the vote would harm the state's best interests. She maintained that important civic, social, and moral reforms could be achieved more effectively without extending the parliamentary franchise to women.

She acted as the main contact for women wishing to join the Association, inviting those opposed to woman suffrage to send their names and addresses to her as secretary. Articulated and communicated the Association’s mission. Helped organize and distribute information, such as public notices and pamphlets, and contributed notes or statements explaining the Association’s purpose and activities.

== Personal and later life ==
She had her close relationship with Margaret Macdonald, Matron-in-Chief of the Canadian Army Medical Corps, dating back to 1914 when they traveled together on the Franconia. In 1917, Plummer even corresponded with Macdonald (whom she addressed familiarly as “Clotilde”), who had made a request for a list of Alberta nurses on behalf of an unnamed male candidate.

Her listed religion on her enlistment papers is Church of England.

In around 1921, she acted as Deputy Commissioner for Land District with the Girl Guides.

In 1920, she is elected as one of the Councillors and a member of Imperial Order Daughters of the Empire. She served as the Director of Camp Libraries within the order's war service department in 1939.

During World War II, she went overseas with the Canadian Active Service Force, organizing field comforts and mobile libraries for troops. While abroad, she suffered a stroke and was invalided home. She resided with her sister Joyce and Plummer died on January 11, 1955 in Toronto, Ontario. She was buried in St. James Cemetery, Toronto.
