= International Year of Human Rights =

1968 was declared the International Year of Human Rights by UNESCO, with the principal goal of bringing attention to the state of human rights throughout the world. On its XX session on March 17–18, 1964, the United Nations Commission on Human Rights considered the decision of the United Nations General Assembly's Eighteenth session to proclaim an International Year of Human Rights, recommending the establishment of a committee in preparation of the celebration of the 20th anniversary of the Universal Declaration of Human Rights and the organisation of an international conference on human rights.

== See also ==
Human rights

- Human Rights Day

History of human rights

- Timeline of young people's rights in the United Kingdom
- Timeline of young people's rights in the United States
- Slavery in international law
- Slavery in Russia
- Slavery in the United States
- Slave Trade Acts
- Human rights in China (PRC)
- Command responsibility
- "Consent of the governed"
- Moral universalism
- Declaration on Great Apes, an effort to extend some human rights to other great apes
- Racial equality proposal (1919)
- The Farewell Sermon (632 CE)
- Youth for Human Rights International
