= Trudi Gerster =

Swiss actor and politician (1919-2013)

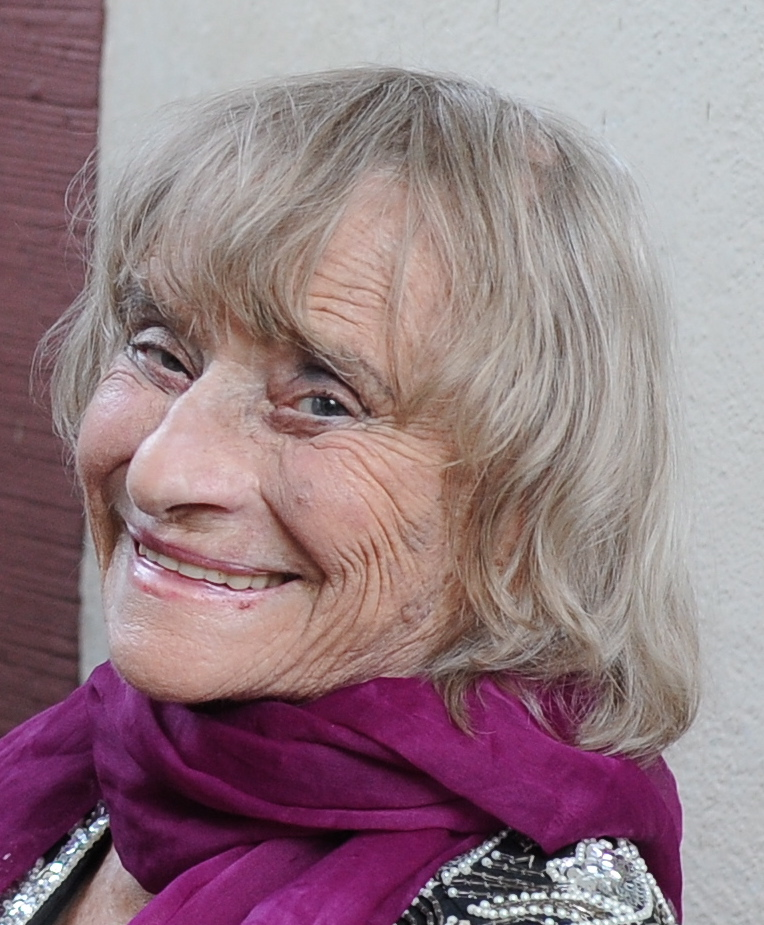

Member of the Grand Council of Basel
- In office 1968–1980

Personal details
- Born: Trudi Gerster; 6 September 1919 St. Gallen, Switzerland
- Died: 27 April 2013 (aged 93) Basel
- Party: Alliance of Independents
- Occupation: Fairy tale narrator, actress

Trudi Gerster (6 September 1919 – 27 April 2013) was a Swiss actress, fairy tale narrator and politician.

== Education and early life ==
Prior to attending school, Gerster was already well-educated and literate. As a student, she entertained her classmates by narrating her favourite fairy tales. Following her graduation from the gymnasium, she performed in several plays, singing and acting, while taking rhetoric lessons in Zurich. Around this time, she had been offered an education in Berlin, but her father did not support the idea of Gerster studying in Germany due to the growing influence of Nazism. In 1939, she was employed as a fairy tale narrator at the Nestlé Children's Paradise of the Swiss National Exposition. Her performance received wide acclaim, and in the following year she was employed by the National Swiss radio station SR DRS.

== Professional career ==
While working as a fairy tale narrator, Gerster made extensive use of the LP record – a new medium at the time. She learnt new techniques so that she could adapt her voice to a multitude of characters through a variety of vocal ranges. She performed all of her characters' sounds and would rehearse all of the squeaks, grunts and hums specific to them. In 1941, Gerster received a contract as a "young naive" at the Theater St. Gallen and was a member of the ensemble until 1946. She then married Walter Jenny and moved to Basel. When her daughter was born in 1950, she adapted her professional life and focused once again on fairy tales. From 1950 onward, she moderated a children's program for the radio station DRS 1. As some opponents tried to ban her from the state radio, it caused fierce resistance by her listeners, whose protests were more successful than her opponents. She also appeared as a guest on the Swiss TV soap opera Lüthi and Blanc in 2005. Her last public appearance, at over 90 years of age, was in Fribourg.

== Political career ==
After Basel allowed women to take part in political life in 1966, she became a member of the Grand Council of Basel in 1968, which she stayed until 1980. She was elected as an independent in 1968, the first elections of the council which allowed women to run. She later joined the Alliance of Independents. She advocated for the abolition of nuclear power plants, the protection of trees, and supported initiatives related to cultural affairs. Due to her proficiency in public speaking, her speeches in parliament were often acclaimed.

== Personal life ==
Gerster married Walter Jenny in 1946. They had two children, a son and a daughter.

== Legacy ==
Trudi Gerster was well known amongst the general public and by the early 1970s has recorded over fifty LP's. But she also performed in cafes or warehouses and often disguised as a fairy lady. The Swiss actor and talk show moderator Viktor Giacobbo described her as a synonym for fairy tales in the Swiss-german region.

In 2009, the film Trudi Gerster– Die Märlikönigin (Trudi Gerster–Fairy Tale Queen) was released.

== Awards ==
- 2005 Prix Walo
