= Nya Dagligt Allehanda =

Defunct Swedish newspaper

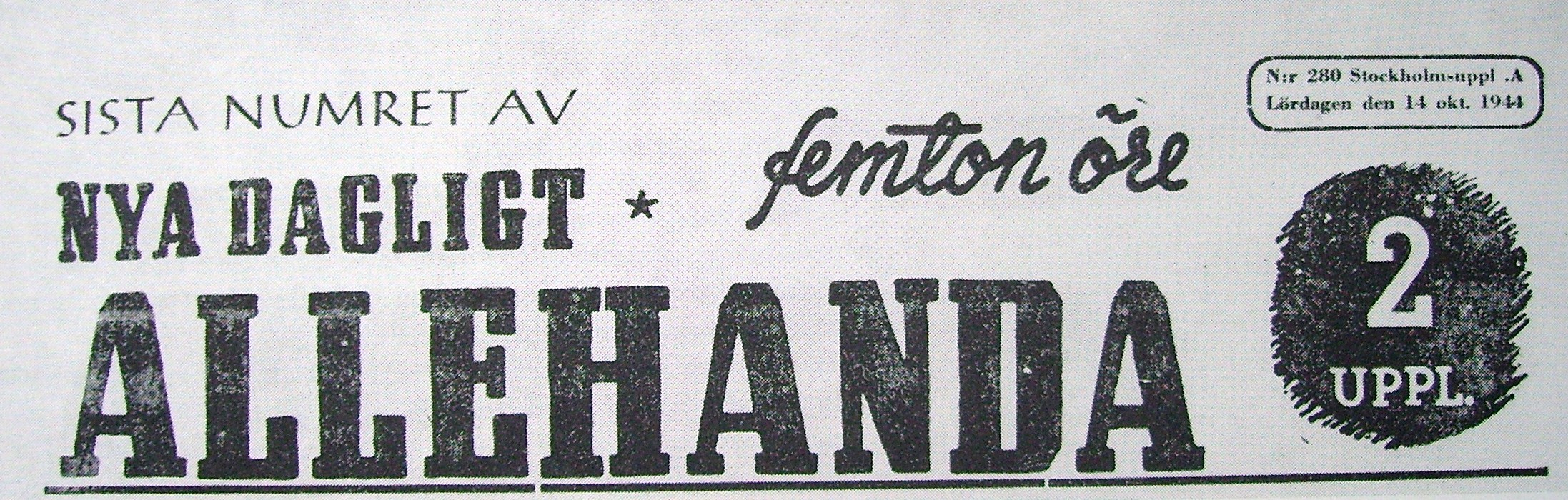
- The last edition of the Nya Dagligt Allehanda, 14 October 1944
- Type: Daily newspaper
- Founded: 1859
- Ceased publication: 1944
- Political alignment: Conservative
- Language: Swedish
- Headquarters: Stockholm

Nya Dagligt Allehanda (New Daily Everywhere), also known as the NDA was a Swedish conservative-leaning newspaper published in Stockholm from 1859 to 1944.

== History ==
The Nya Dagligt Allehanda was founded as a continuation of another newspaper, the Svenska tidningen, Dagligt Allehanda i Stockholm that was active from 1851-1859 and published by Colonel Johan August Hazelius, which in turn originated in the Daglig Allehanda founded in 1767.

NDA's founder, philosophy doctor Karl Adam Lindström, an official of the National Archives, explained that the new newspaper "would convey in a serious and sensible way the cause of calm progress and with violence and justice in a tidy and decent tone address the changing issues of the day" .

Lindström was, with two brief interruptions, both editor-in-chief and responsible publisher until his death in 1885. The newspaper appeared with its own conservative program and intended to a certain extent to counterbalance the liberal Aftonbladet. NDA worked vigorously for a return to the protectionist customs system and for the division's maintenance as the basis of the defence system, as well as against any concessions to Norway.

From 1906 to 1936, Leonard Ljunglund was the newspaper's publisher and editor-in-chief, under whose leadership the paper first achieved great success. In 1908, the NDA merged with the newspaper Vårt Land to form Nya Dagligt Allehanda - Vårt Land with joint editorial staff and a newly formed company. However, the newspaper went into daily publication under the name Nya Dagligt Allehanda and withdrew this name in 1912. The NDA distinguished itself as having a German-friendly line during the First World War and during the years 1934-1936 when it was favourable to the Nazis. During Ljunglund's later time as editor, the paper reversed this position. After running into financial problems, it was bought in 1944 by Dagens Nyheter as part of the formation of the new newspaper Expressen.

== Editors-in-chief ==
- Karl Adam Lindström 1859–1885
- Wilhelm Alexander Bergstrand 1885–1891
- Johan Abraham Björklund 1891–1905
- John Wigforss 1905–1906
- Leonard Ljunglund 1906–1936
- Harald André 1936–1938
- Carl Björkman 1938
- Ragnar Ekman 1938–1942
- Erik Wästberg 1942–1944
