= William Blake Richmond =

English painter, sculptor and designer (1842–1921)

Sir William Richmond KCB, RA
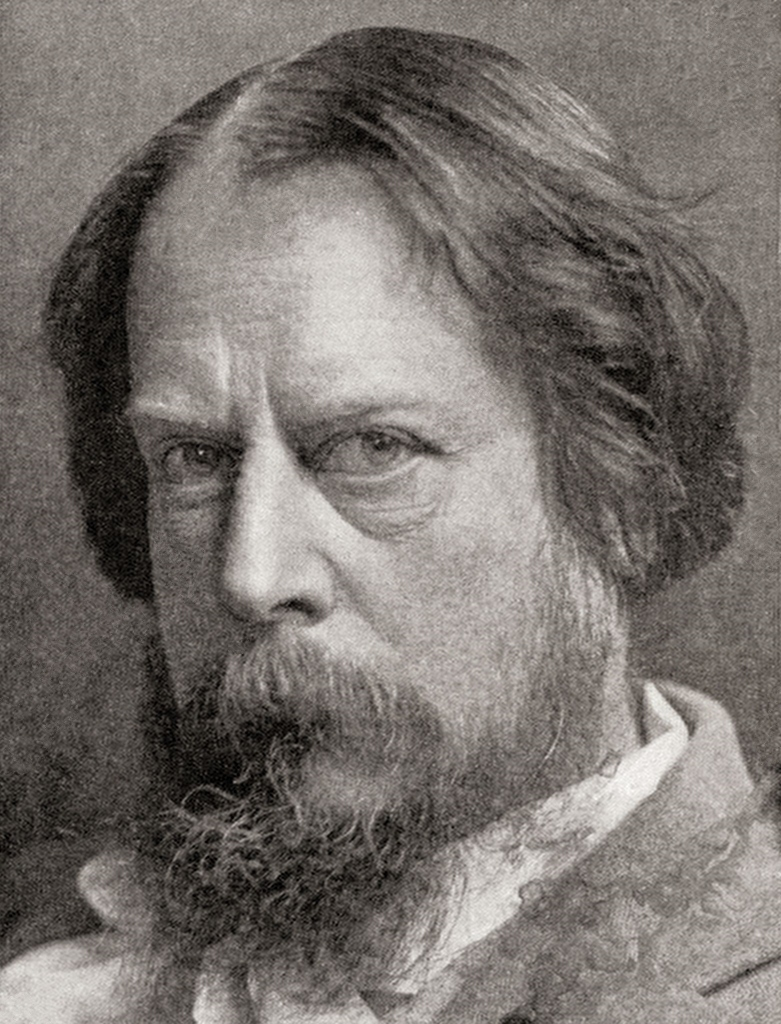
- William Richmond c. 1907
- Born: 29 November 1842; Marylebone, Middlesex England, United Kingdom
- Died: 11 February 1921 (aged 78); Hammersmith, County of London, England, United Kingdom
- Education: Royal Academy of Arts
- Known for: Portrait painting; stained-glass design; mosaic design
- Notable work: Mosaic decorations in St Paul's Cathedral
- Movement: Arts and Crafts Movement
- Spouses: Charlotte Foster; Clara Jane Richards
- Awards: Knight Commander of the Order of the Bath

Sir William Blake Richmond KCB RA PPRBSA (29 November 1842 – 11 February 1921) was a British painter, sculptor and a designer of stained glass and mosaic. He is best known for his portrait work and decorative mosaics in St Paul's Cathedral in London.

== Early life and education ==
William Blake Richmond was born on 29 November 1842 in Marylebone, the third generation of an artistic dynasty. His grandfather was Thomas Richmond (1771–1837), the miniature painter, his father was George Richmond RA, an important portrait painter; his mother was Julia Tatham (1811–1881). In addition, his uncle was another portrait painter, Thomas Richmond. He himself was named after a close friend of his father, the poet William Blake and had as Godparent Blake's disciple, Samuel Palmer.

Richmond was tutored at home due to health problems as a child. In 1858, at the age of 14, Richmond enrolled at the Royal Academy of Art where he studied drawing and painting for three years. He also spent time at John Ruskin's house, where he was given private art lessons by the prominent artist. In 1859, Richmond painted his first picture, Enid and Geraint. He sold the painting for £20, spending the money to tour Italy for six weeks with a tutor. His time spent viewing the Old Master paintings in Italy had a major impact on Richmond's development as an artist and later career. His favourite Italian painters were Michelangelo, Tintoretto and Giotto.

== Artistic career ==
=== Painting ===
Richmond became a successful portrait painter at an early age. In 1861, at the age of 19, he exhibited his first major work for the Royal Academy. The painting, a portrait of his two brothers, was highly praised by Ruskin. That year, Richmond continued to work in portraits, and study anatomy at St Bartholomew's Hospital. Richmond's widely regarded portraits led to several commissions, a few of which took him to the north of England for several months.

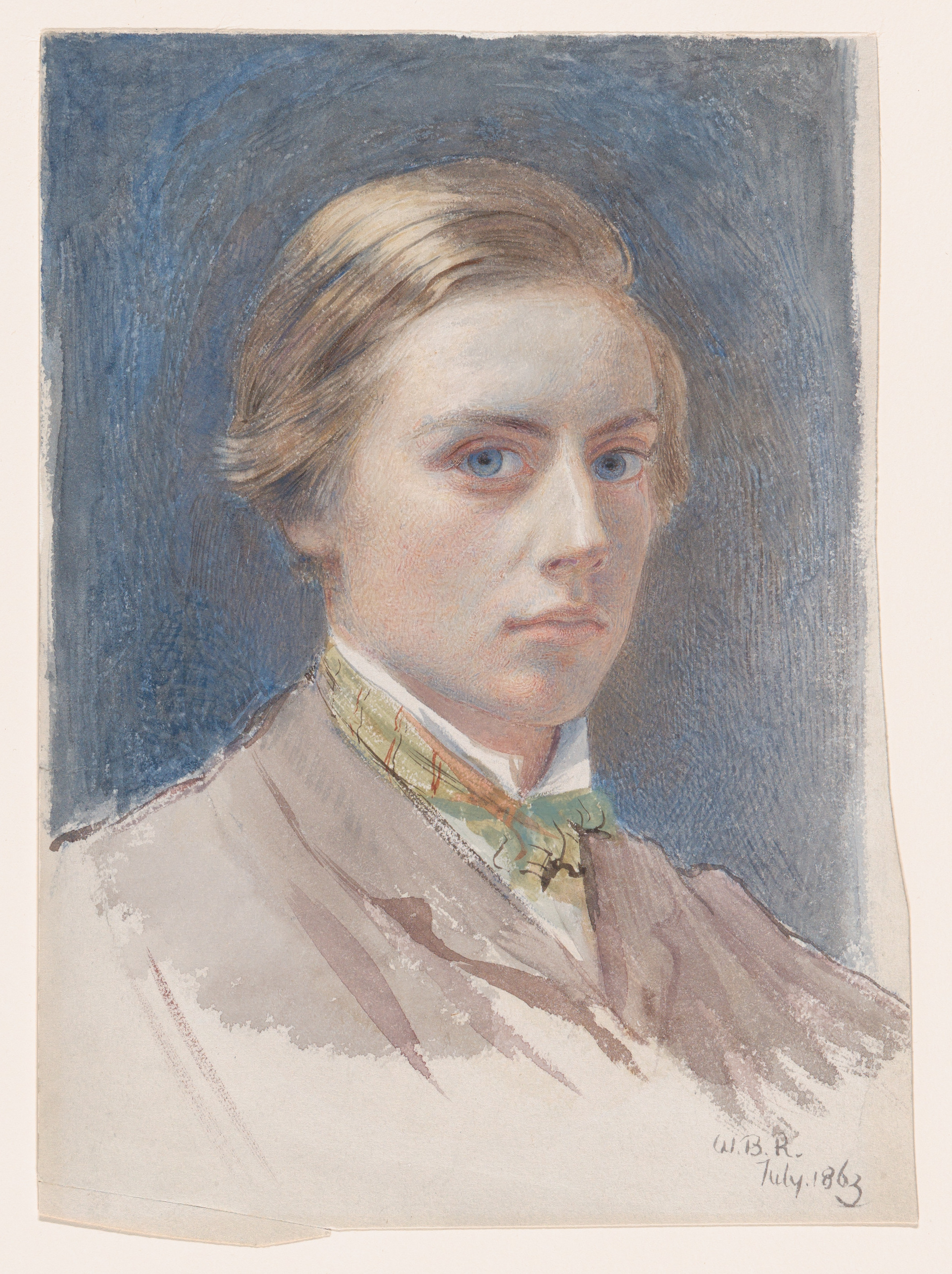
Self-portrait 1863

Richmond was elected to the Royal Academy in 1861, where he continued to exhibit his work until 1877. In 1865, Richmond returned to Italy, where he lived in Rome for four years and studied art. While in Italy, he met the painters Frederic Leighton and Giovanni Costa, both of whose work he admired. When Richmond returned to England, he exhibited A Procession in Honour of Bacchus at the Royal Academy in 1869.

In 1877, Richmond left the Royal Academy and began exhibiting his paintings with the Grosvenor Gallery, where he exhibited until 1878. In 1878 Richmond became Slade Professor of Fine Art at Oxford University, succeeding Ruskin. During his tenure, Richmond was responsible for twelve lectures a year at the school. A few lectures Richmond gave on his favourite artist Michelangelo led to a conflict with Ruskin, who had little regard for that artist. The disagreement between the two men led Richmond to resign his position after five years, although he and Ruskin were able to continue their long-standing friendship.

Richmond travelled often to Italy, Greece, Spain and Egypt in the 1880s. He would spend a few months each year exploring new areas, absorbing the history and mythology of the region, and making numerous drawings and coloured sketches.

In 1888, Richmond resumed his relationship with the Royal Academy when he was elected an Associate Member (ARA), and was then further elected a Royal Academician (RA) in 1895. He served as Professor of Painting at the academy from 1895 to 1899 and from 1909 to 1911, and continued to exhibit with the academy until 1916. He was elected Senior RA at the academy in 1920.

=== Mosaic design ===
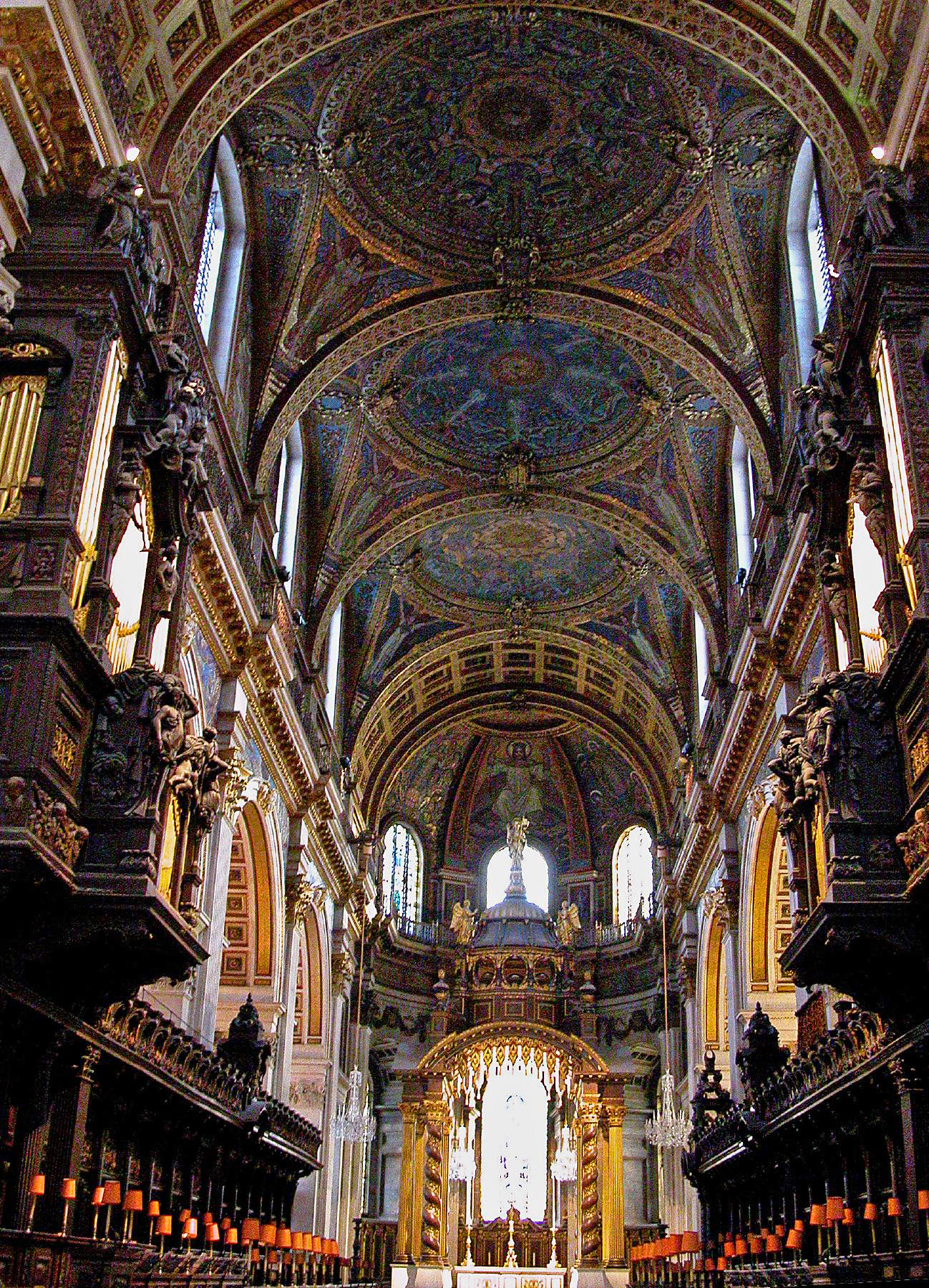
Richmond's mosaic panels in the interior of St Paul's Cathedral

Attaining financial success as a portrait painter led Richmond to explore new areas of interest. He began working on large, allegorical paintings, and developed an interest in the design of stained glass mosaic. In 1882, Richmond gave a lecture on monumental decoration in which he criticised the bland decorations in many British churches. He viewed the churches as "caves of white-washed sepulchres, uncoloured, or if coloured at all, only in parts, patchily, and with little general idea of design."

Nine years later, in 1891, Richmond put his theory into practice when he started work on the quire and apse of St Paul's Cathedral. Richmond worked on the interior decorations, as both designer and craftsman involved in the installation of the mosaics, from 1891 to 1904.

Influenced by the vibrant colours of Byzantine and early Christian work in Italy, Greece and Egypt, Richmond designed bold, colourful mosaics for the Cathedral quire and apse; over seventy allegorical mosaic panels were installed, along with spandrels and ornamental mosaic ceiling decoration. Richmond's work was a complete renewal of the quire, the decorations painted directly onto the existing architectural ornaments and stained-glass windows.

"Richmond chose to abandon the flat surface of mosaicists like Salviati, in favour of a more vibrant treatment, based on the use of jagged, irregular glass, set at angles to the plaster, so that it would catch the light. The new installation was a complete renewal of the quire, the decorations painted directly onto the existing architectural decorations and stained glass windows."

When completed, the newly remodeled quire and apse, met with public controversy. Several people criticised the mosaics as not being traditionally British and did not belong in a Cathedral. There was a continual debate throughout the 1890s, "partly reflecting a High-Low church debate between ornament and plainness."

=== Stained-glass design ===
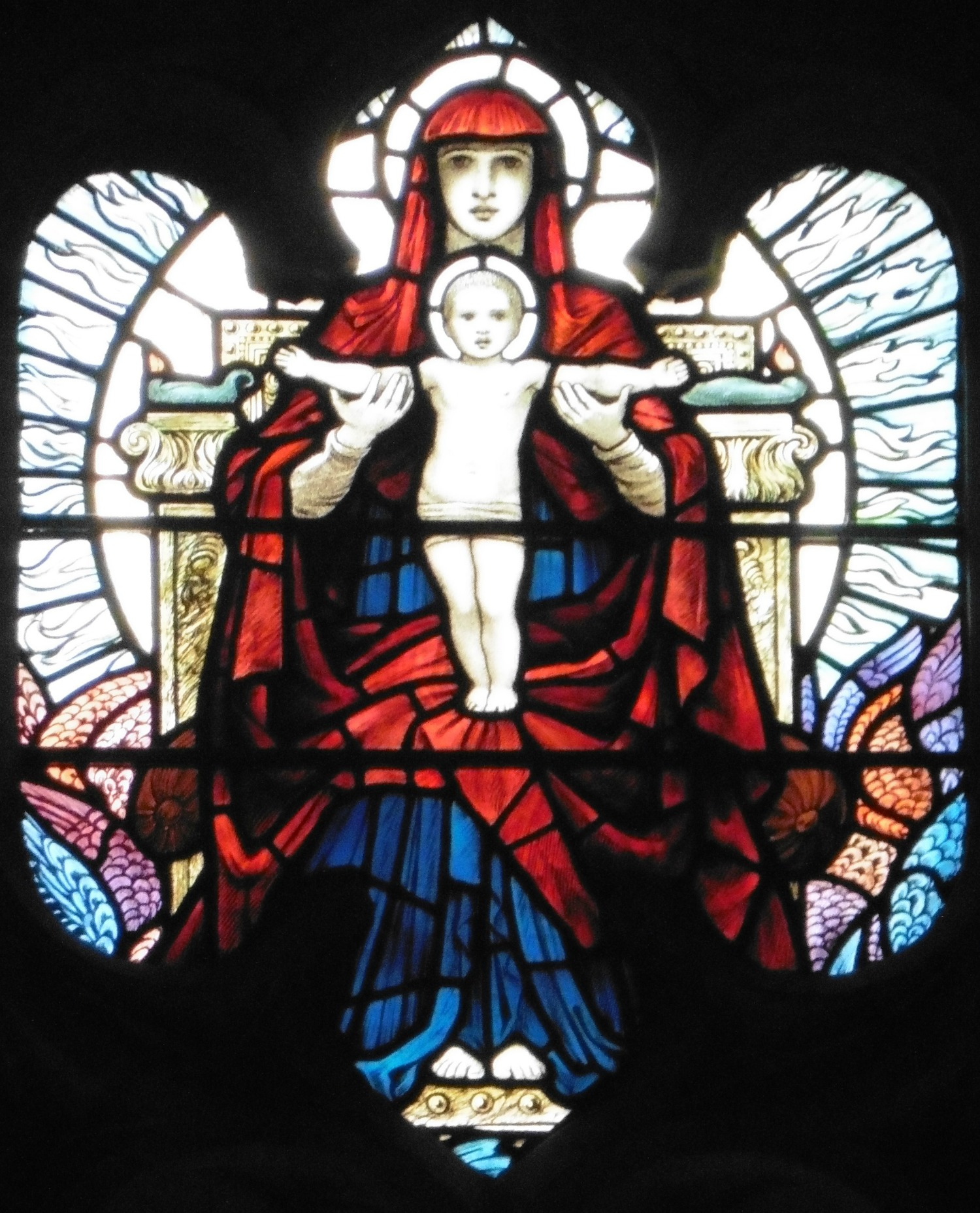
Charity, Holy Trinity, Sloane Square, London

Richmond collaborated with Harry James Powell of James Powell and Sons, glassmakers, in developing new colours for the mosaic glass to be installed in St Paul's Cathedral. The new colours and combinations of those colours began to be offered in the standard Powell glass palette from the early 1890s. The expanded glass selection inspired artists in the early stages of the Arts and Crafts Movement. The new, heavier glass, often with light streaks of colour was used by artists in newly commissioned stained-glass windows and decorative work.

The influence of the mosaic work done at the cathedral and the invention of new medieval-like colours by Powell, influenced Richmond in the stained-glass windows that he designed for St Mary's, Stretton, Staffordshire. Richmond's five-light east window in the chancel of St Mary's Church, Stretton, East Staffordshire, completed in 1896, was a successful translation of his previous work into stained glass. His mosaic-influenced work at Stretton is displayed in the surface of the glass, roughly painted to resemble the effects of mosaic. The three-light north and south chancel windows that he designed for St Mary's (1898), were similar in theme to his earlier mosaic work with his choice of heavy leading in the windows and glass that gave off a sparkling appearance. The raw materials he selected for the windows included thick slabs of glass, streaked with light veins of colour. This glass may have been used in his work at the cathedral.

Richmond designed three large windows (1904—1910) in the Lady Chapel of Holy Trinity, Sloane Street, London.

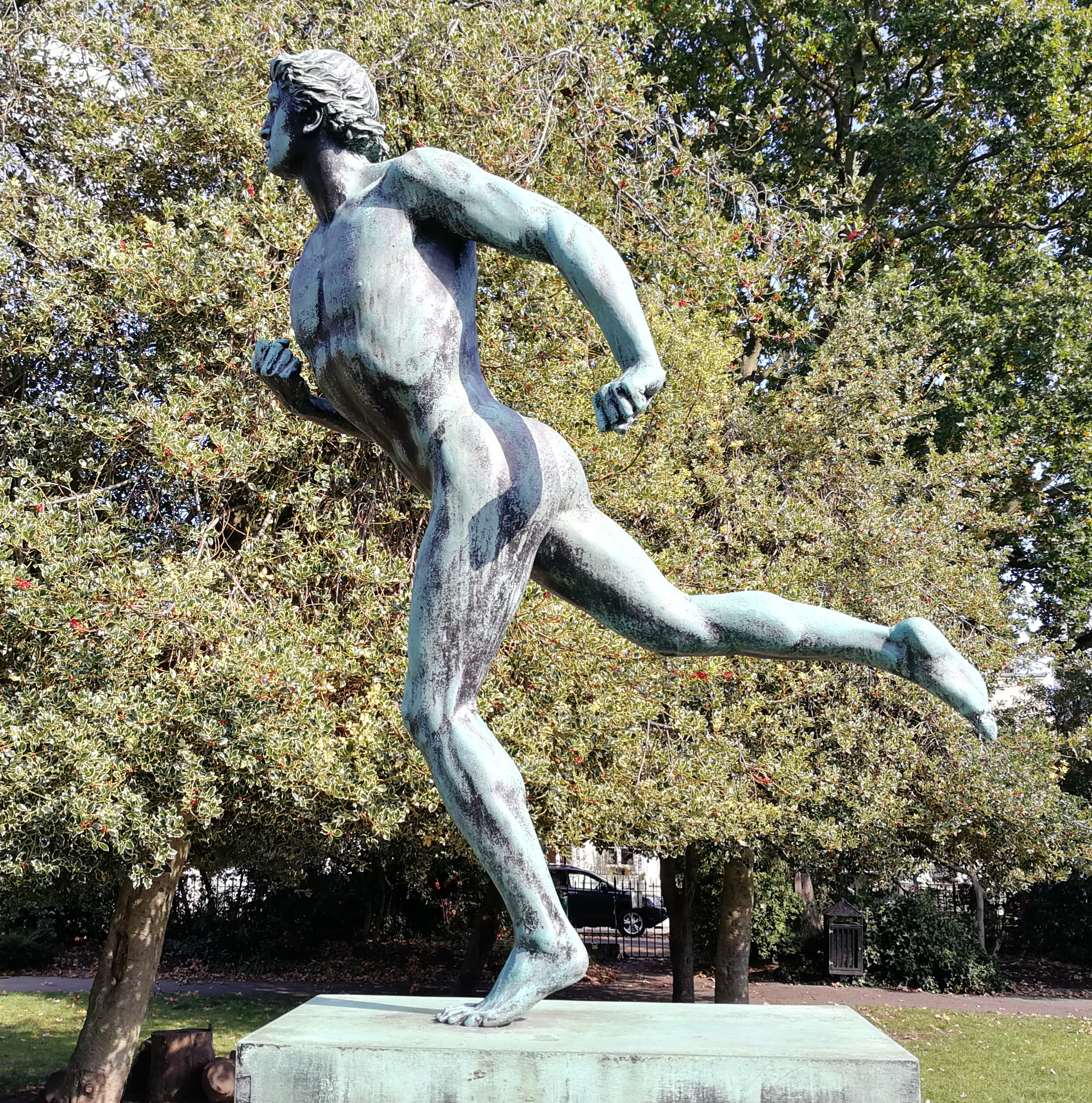
The Greek Runner (1879), St Peter's Square, Hammersmith

=== Sculpture ===
Richmond created a number of highly acclaimed sculptures, including a piece titled An Athlete exhibited at the Grosvenor Gallery in 1879, a bronze sculpture of a Greek runner donated to his village of Hammersmith, and an Arts-and-Crafts style monument of William Gladstone in St Deiniol's Church in Hawarden, Flintshire.

== Environmental activism ==
Richmond was an early advocate for clean air in London. He founded the Coal Smoke Abatement Society (CSAS) in 1898 and was a member of CSAS for a number of years. He decided to form the organisation after becoming increasingly frustrated with the low light levels in winter caused by coal smoke. Richmond penned a letter to The Times in 1898 with a request for action, stating that "the darkness was comparable to a total eclipse of the sun".

== Awards and recognition ==
- 1888: Elected Associate of the Royal Academy of Art ARA
- 1891: Elected Master of the Art Workers' Guild
- 1895: Elected Royal Academician of the Royal Academy of Art RA
- 1897: Awarded Order of the Bath
- 1908: Elected 35th President of The Birmingham and Midland Institute

== Personal life ==
Richmond married Charlotte Foster (1841–1865) at Marylebone in 1864. Charlotte died a year later on 31 December 1865.

He subsequently married Clara Jane Richards (1846–1915) at Ryde, Isle of Wight in 1867. Their first two children were Francis, born in Italy in 1868, and Helen, born in Algiers in 1870. The family returned to England in 1870 and moved to Beavor Lodge, Hammersmith, where their sons Herbert, Julius, Ernest, John, and Arthur were born between 1871 and 1879.

Richmond died at his home, Beavor Lodge, in Hammersmith on 11 February 1921.

== Gallery ==
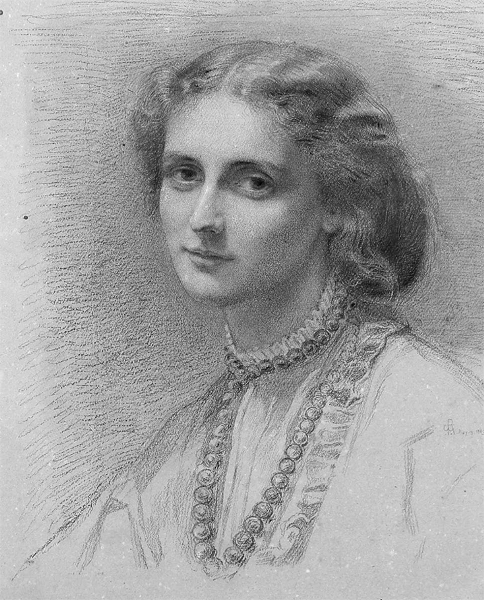
William Richmond's first wife, Charlotte Foster

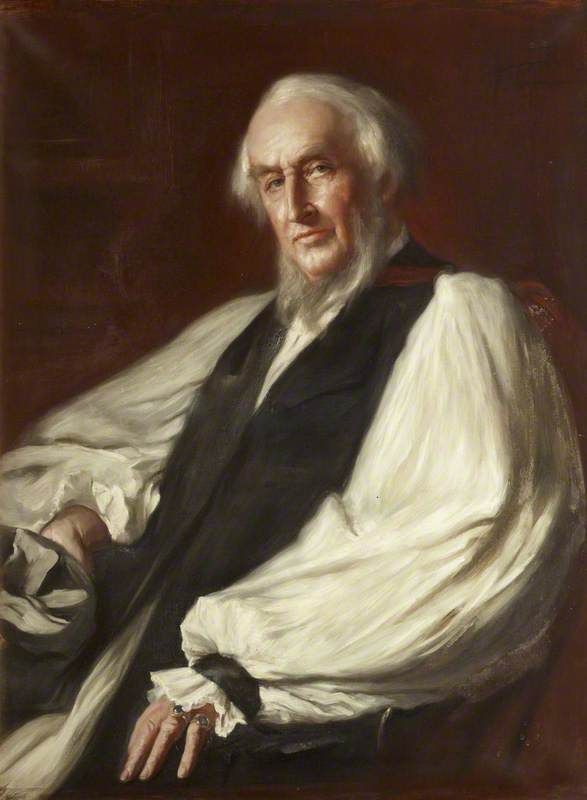
Rev. Lord Arthur Hervey

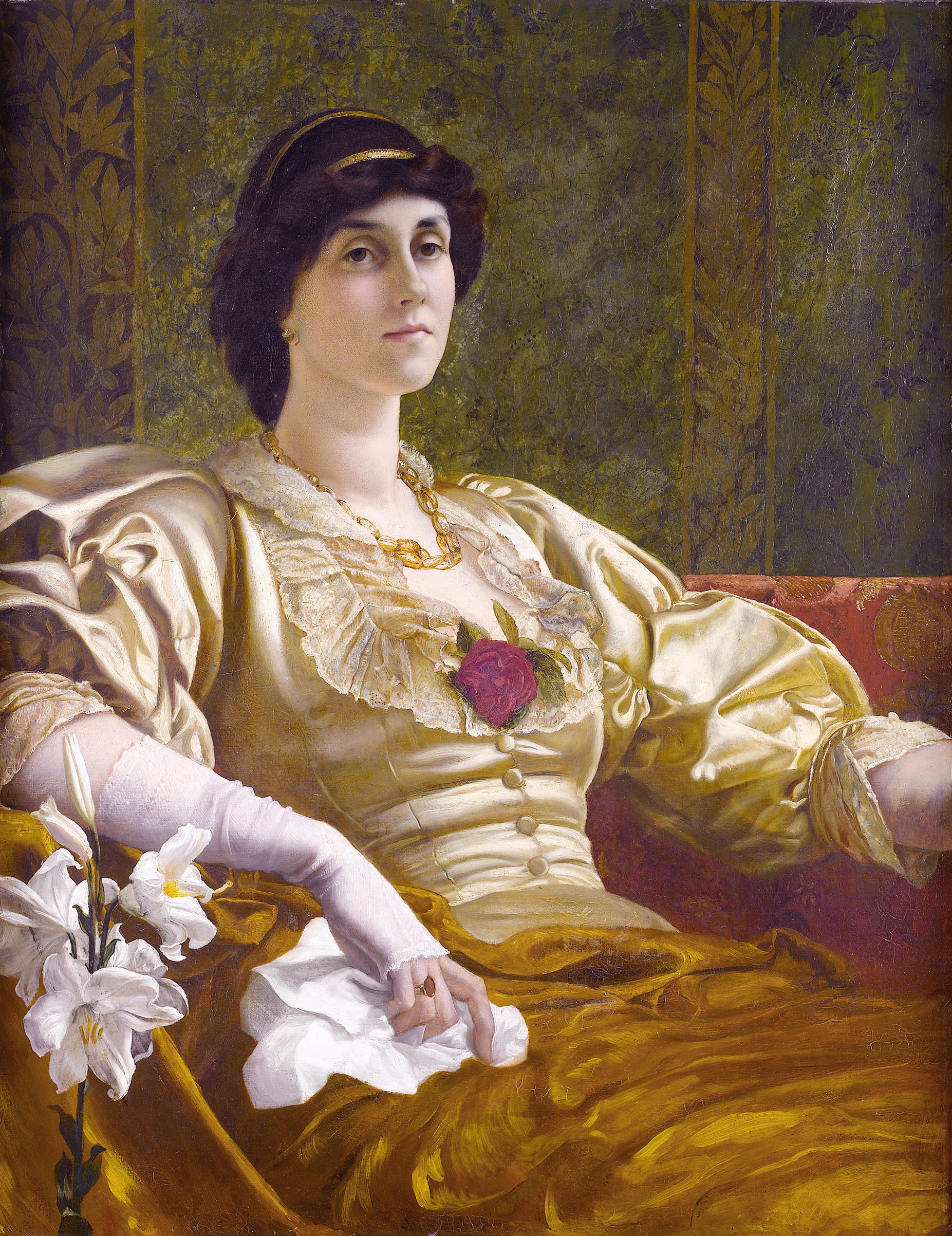
Ethel Bertha Harrison

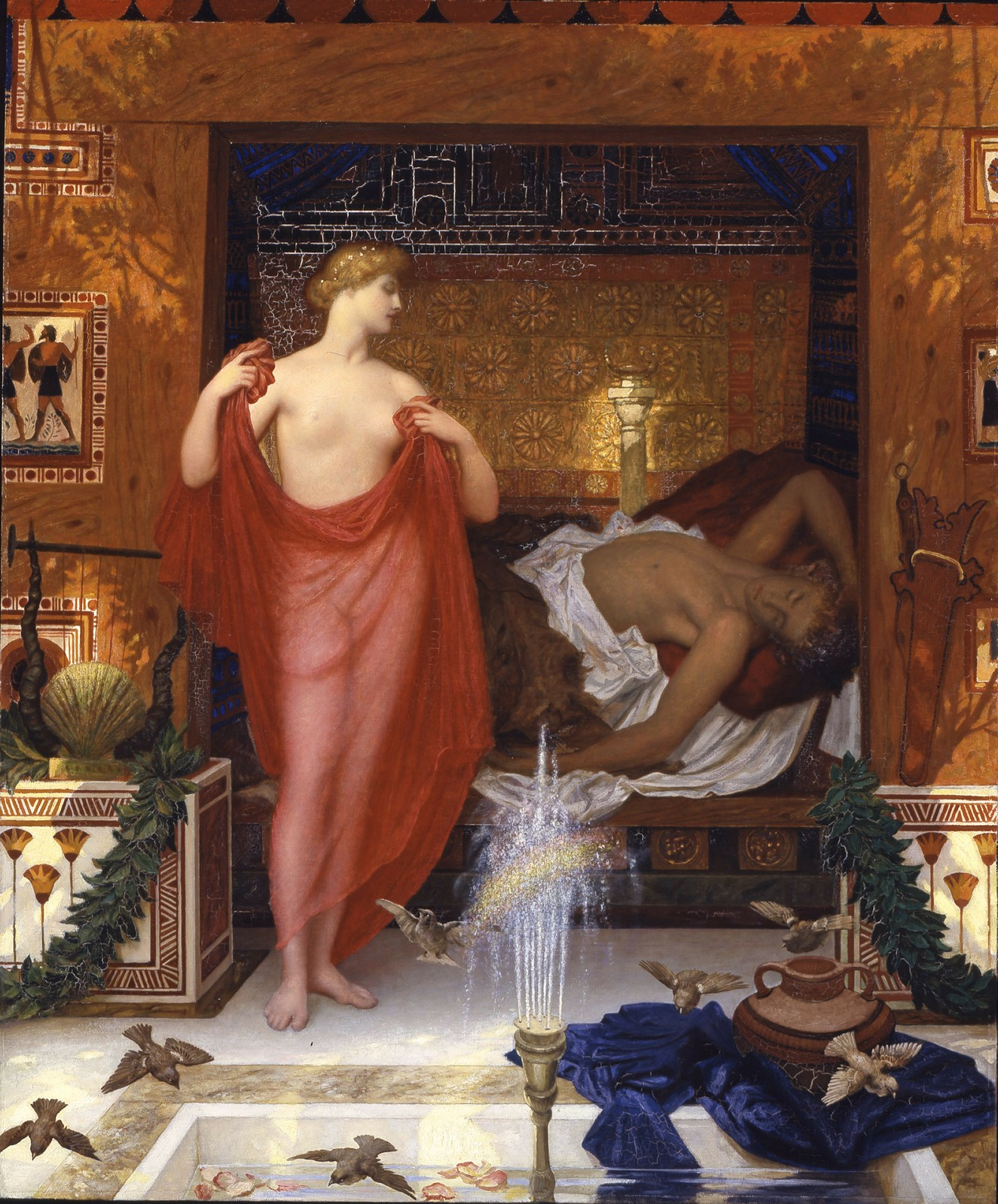
Hera in the House of Hephaistos

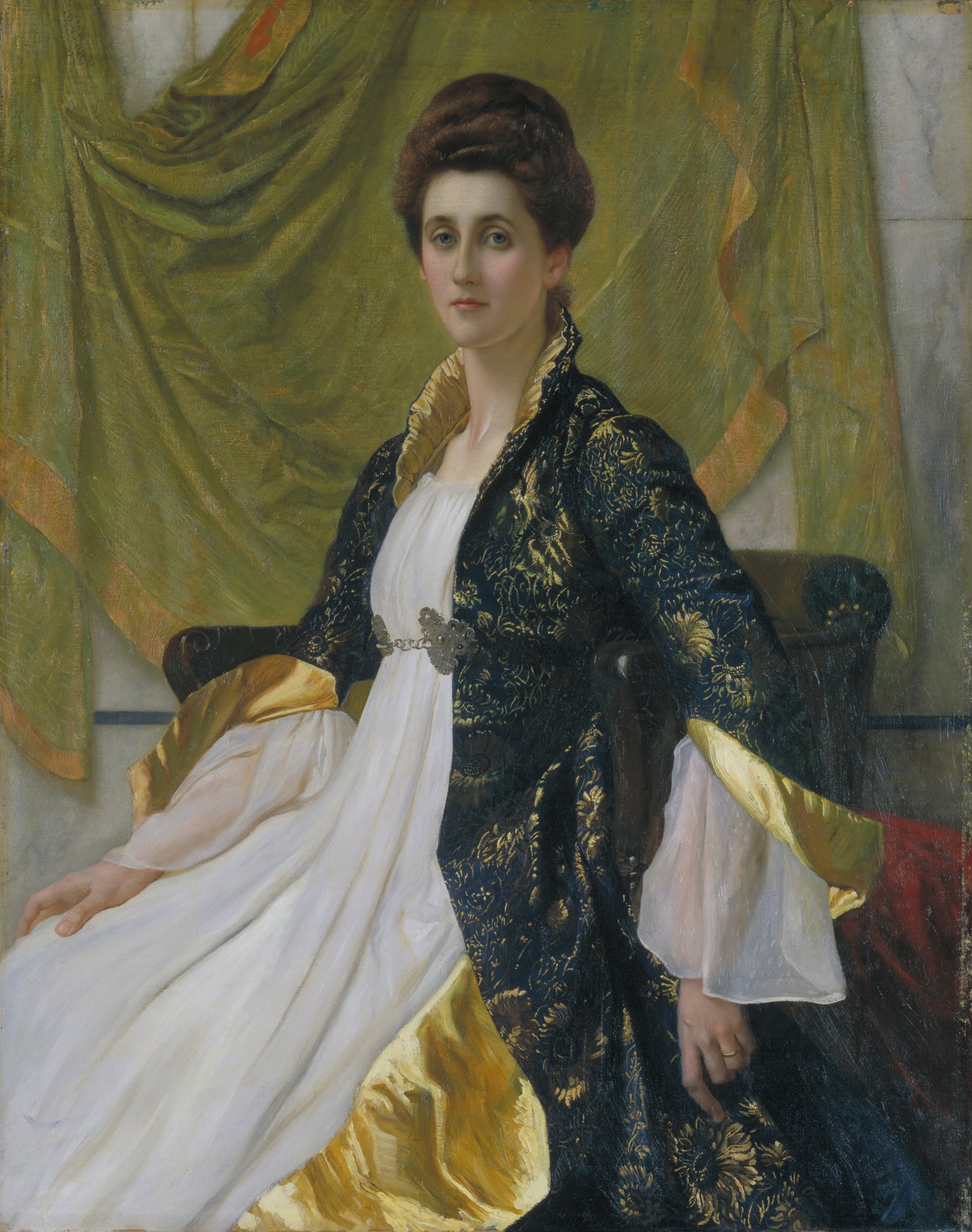
Portrait of Mrs Ernest Moon

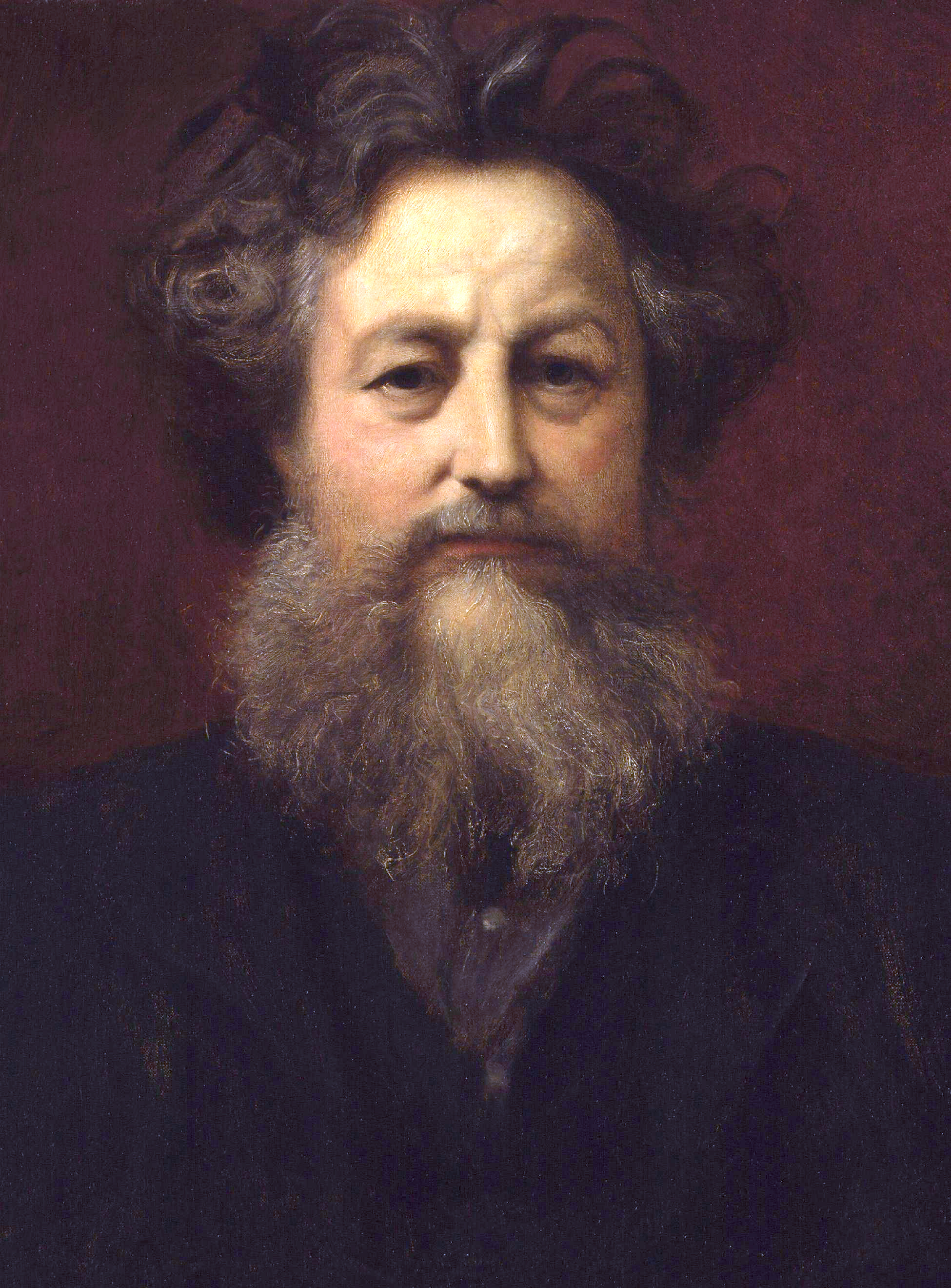
William Morris, leader of the Arts and Crafts Movement

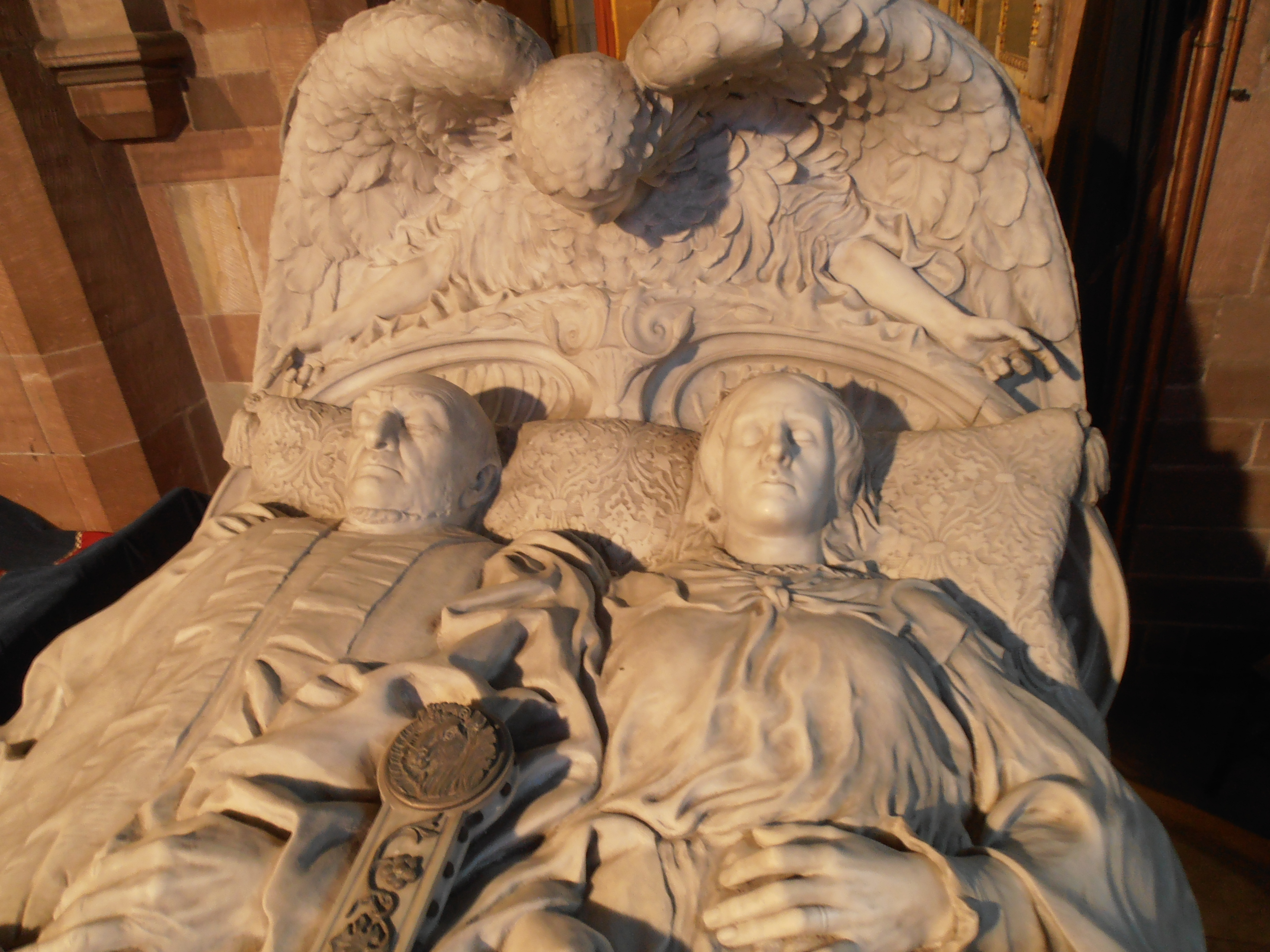
William and Catherine Gladstone monument, St Deiniol's Church, Hawarden

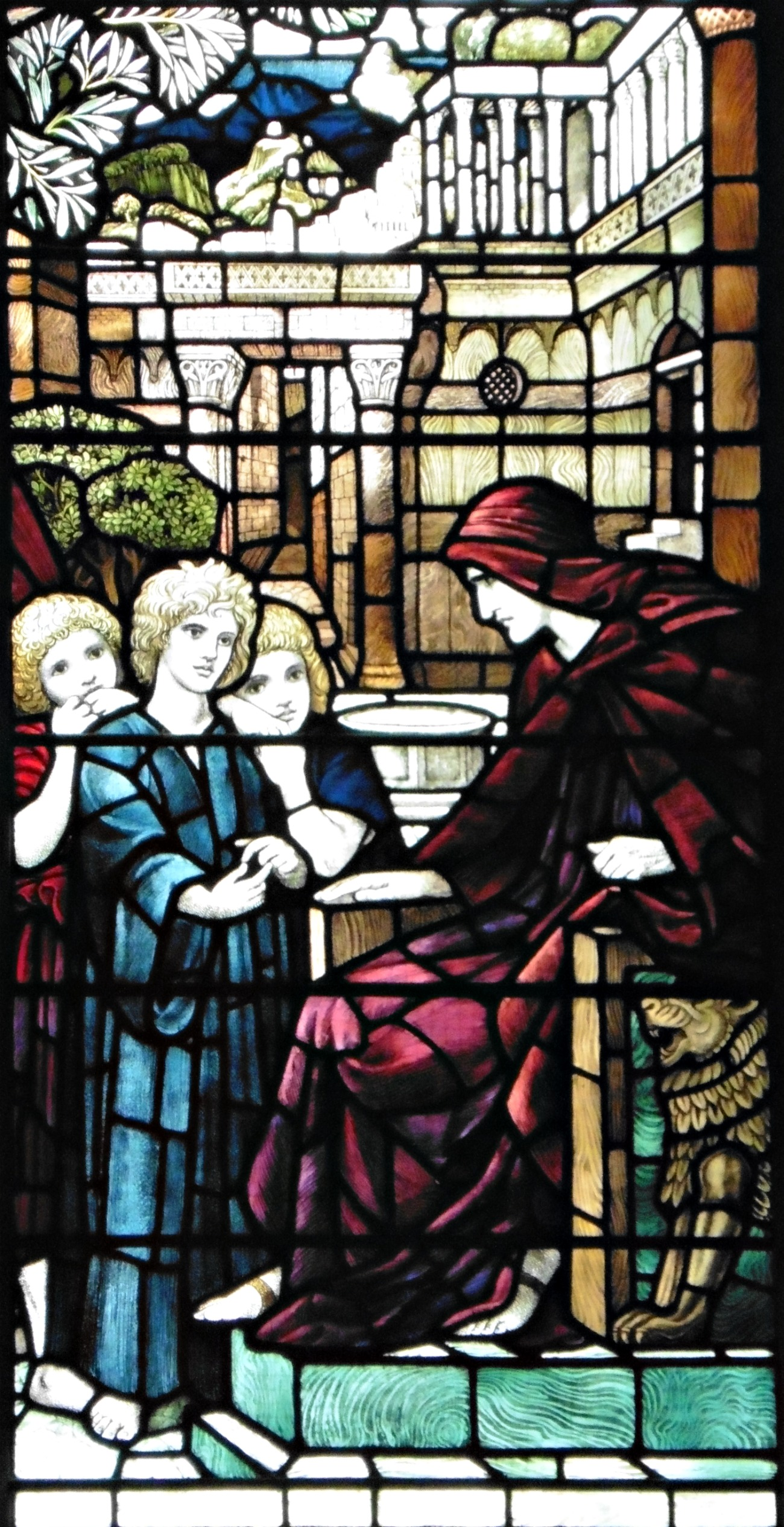
Youth, stained-glass window, Holy Trinity, Sloane Street, London

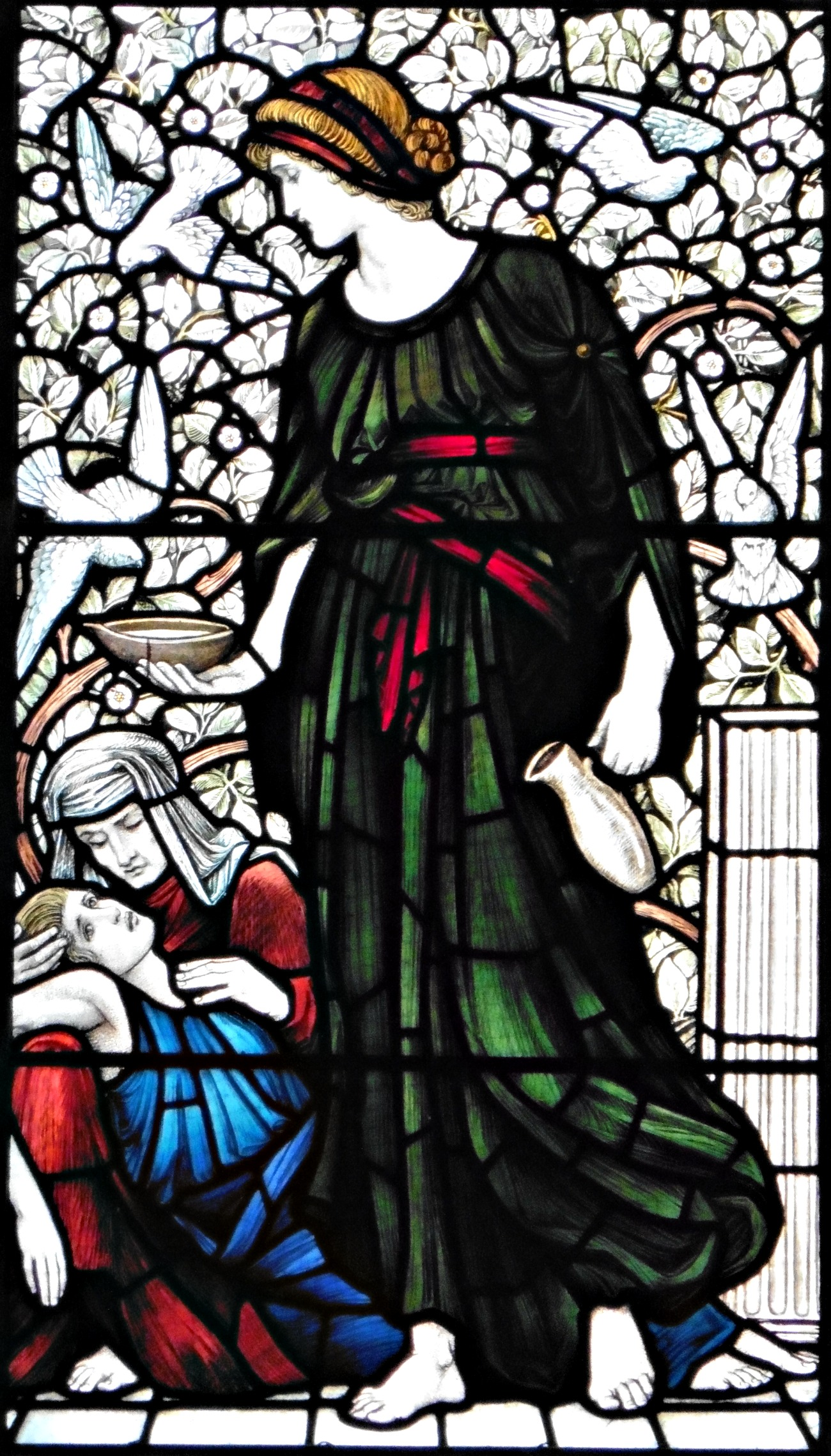
Charity, Holy Trinity, Sloane Street, London

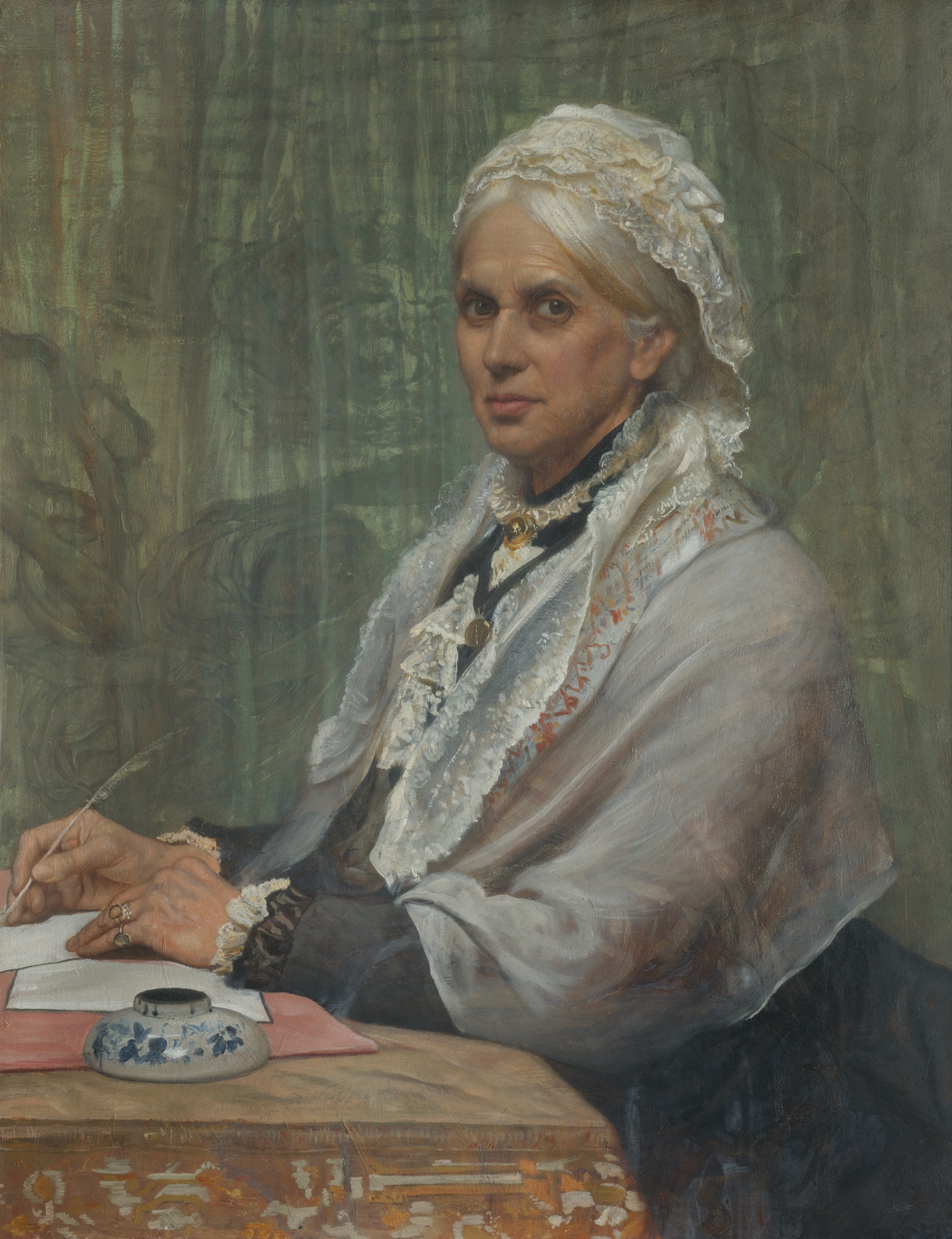
Anne Clough
