= Frederic Harrison =

British jurist and historian (1831–1923)

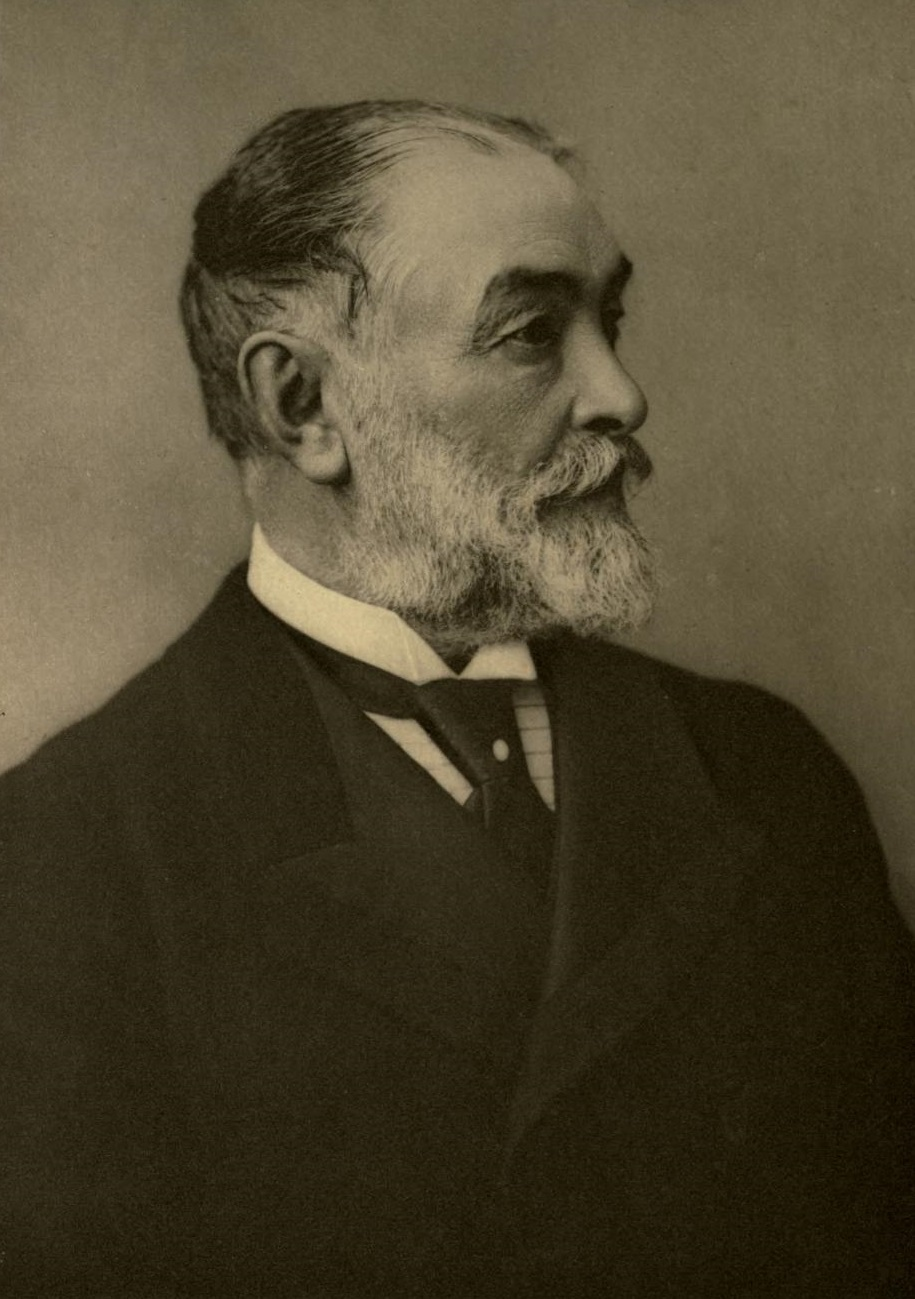
- Portrait of Frederic Harrison, by Bassano, 1901.
- Born: 18 October 1831; London, England
- Died: 14 January 1923 (aged 91)
- Occupations: Historian, jurist
- Spouse: Ethel Bertha Harrison (m. 1870; died 1916)
- Children: 4
- Relatives: Austin Harrison (son)

Frederic Harrison (18 October 1831 – 14 January 1923) was a British jurist and historian. A leading figure in the English Positivist movement and a disciple of Auguste Comte, he was known for his wide-ranging contributions to political philosophy, legal theory, and public discourse. Harrison was a prolific writer and lecturer whose works spanned history, law, religion, literature, and international affairs. He played a prominent role in Victorian intellectual life, contributing regularly to influential periodicals such as The Fortnightly Review, and was noted for his radical political stance in support of trade union rights, universal education, and democratic reform.

== Biography ==
Born at 17 Euston Square, London, he was the son of Frederick Harrison (1799–1881), a stockbroker and his wife Jane, daughter of Alexander Brice, a Belfast granite merchant. He was baptised at St. Pancras Church, Euston, and spent his early childhood at the northern London suburb of Muswell Hill, to which the family moved soon after his birth. His father later acquired a lease on the grand Tudor manor house Sutton Place near Guildford, Surrey, in 1874, which descended to his elder son Sidney, and about which Frederic jnr. wrote the definitive history Annals of an Old Manor House: Sutton Place, Guildford, first published in 1893. His paternal grandfather was a Leicestershire builder. In 1840, the family moved again to 22 Oxford Square, Hyde Park, London, a house designed by Harrison's father. Along with his siblings Sidney and Lawrence, Harrison received his initial education at home before attending a day school in St John's Wood. In 1843, he entered King's College School, graduating as second in the school in 1849.

== Oxford and Positivism ==
He received a scholarship to Wadham College, Oxford in 1849. It was at Oxford that he was to embrace positive philosophy, under the influence of his tutor Richard Congreve and the works of John Stuart Mill and George Henry Lewes. Harrison found himself in conflict with Congreve as to details, and eventually led the Positivists who split off and founded Newton Hall in 1881, and he was president of the English Positivist Committee from 1880 to 1905; he was also editor and part author of the Positivist New Calendar of great Men (1892), and wrote much on Auguste Comte and Positivism. For more than three decades, he was a regular contributor to The Fortnightly Review, often in defence of Positivism, especially Comte's version of it.

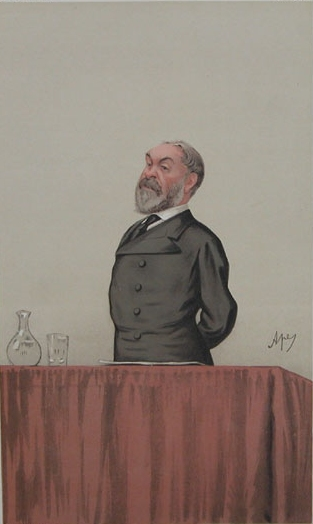
A caricature of Frederic Harrison by Carlo Pellegrini (known as "Ape"; died 1889), published in Vanity Fair, 23 January 1886, with the caption "An apostle of Positivism"

Among his contemporaries at Wadham were Edward Spencer Beesly, John Henry Bridges, and George Earlam Thorley who were to become the leaders of the secular Religion of Humanity or "Comtism" in England. He received a second class in Moderations in 1852 and a first class in Literae Humaniores in 1853. In the following year, he was elected a fellow of the college and became a tutor, taking over from Congreve. He became part of a liberal group of academics at Oxford that also included Arthur Penrhyn Stanley, Goldwin Smith, Mark Pattison and Benjamin Jowett.

As a religious teacher, literary critic, historian and jurist, Harrison took a prominent part in the life of his time, and his writings, though often violently controversial on political, religious and social subjects, and in their judgment and historical perspective characterized by a modern Radical point of view, are those of an accomplished scholar, and of one whose wide knowledge of literature was combined with independence of thought and admirable vigour of style. In 1907 he published The Creed of a Layman, which included his Apologia pro fide mea, in explanation of his Positivist religious position.

== Legal and publishing career ==
He was called to the bar in 1858, and, in addition to his practice in equity cases, soon began to distinguish himself as an effective contributor to the higher-class reviews. Two articles in the Westminster Review, one on the Italian question, which procured him the special thanks of Cavour, the other on Essays and Reviews, which had the probably undesigned effect of stimulating the attack on the book, attracted especial notice. A few years later Harrison worked at the codification of the law with Lord Westbury, of whom he contributed an interesting notice to Nash's biography of the chancellor. His special interest in legislation for the working classes led him to be placed upon the Trades Union Commission of 1867–1869; he was secretary to the commission for the digest of the law, 1869–1870; and was from 1877 to 1889 professor of jurisprudence and international law under the Council of Legal Education. He was also professor of jurisprudence to the Inns of Court, and an Honorary fellow of Wadham College.

Of his separate publications, the most important are his lives of Cromwell (1888), William the Silent, (1897), Ruskin (1902), and Chatham (1905); his Meaning of History (1862; enlarged 1894) and Byzantine History in the Early Middle Ages (1900); and his essays on Early Victorian Literature (1896) and The Choice of Books (1886) are remarkable alike for generous admiration and good sense. In 1904 he published a "romantic monograph" of the 10th century Byzantine resurgence, Theophano, based on the empress of that name, and in 1906 a verse tragedy, Nicephorus, based on Emperor Nikephoros II. His Annals of an Old Manor House: Sutton Place, Guildford, first published in London in 1893 as a quarto work, re-issued in a small abridged form in 1899, is a valuable and detailed study of the Weston family and the architecturally important manor house Sutton Place built by Sir Richard Weston c. 1525. Harrison's father had been the lessee since 1874 and the author had many years of access in which to perform his detailed investigations and researches.

He gave the Sir Robert Rede Lecture at the University of Cambridge in 1900.

== Politics ==
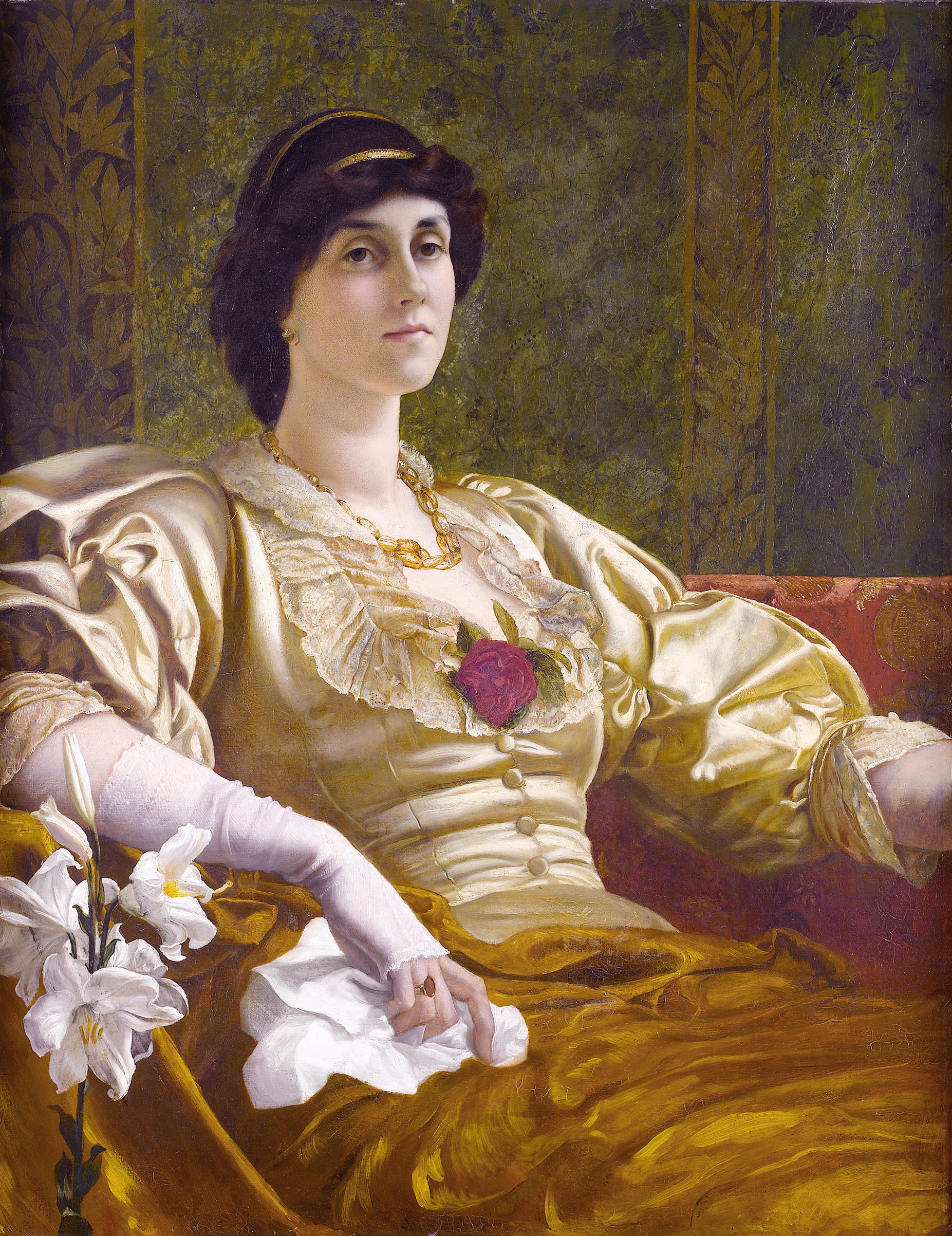
Ethel Bertha Harrison (1851–1916) (William Blake Richmond)

An advanced and vehement Radical in politics and Progressive in municipal affairs, Harrison in 1886 stood unsuccessfully as the Liberal Party candidate against Sir John Lubbock for the University of London parliamentary constituency. In 1889, he was elected an alderman of the London County Council, but resigned in 1893.

Harrison was a regular contributor to George Potter's trade unionist journal The Beehive, and to W. H. Riley's Commonwealth, which promoted the International Working Men's Association. He was a supporter of Polish and Italian independence, the Union in the American Civil War, the reformers in the Jamaica Committee of 1866, the Paris Commune and was a vice president of the Reform League. In an article defending the Paris Commune which appeared in the Fortnightly Review Harrison proclaimed: 'The status quo is impossible. The alternative is Communism or Positivism.'

Later works include Autobiographic Memoirs (1911); The Positive Evolution of Religion (1912); The German Peril (1915); On Society (1918); Jurisprudence and Conflict of Nations (1919); Obiter Dicta (1919); Novissima Verba (1920). The last two of these were collections of vigorous comments on politics and literature contributed by him to the Fortnightly Review towards the end of World War I and immediately afterwards.

== Family ==
In 1870, Harrison married his first cousin Ethel Bertha Harrison, daughter of William Harrison. They had four sons, including the journalist and literary critic Austin Harrison. George Gissing, the novelist, was at one time their tutor; and in 1905, Harrison wrote a preface to Gissing's Veranilda. One of the sons, Christopher René Harrison, was killed in World War I.

== Works ==
- The Herbert Spencer lecture (1 ed.). Oxford: Clarendon Press. 1905.
- Frederic Harrison (1982). The new calendar of great men: biographies of the 558 worthies of all ages. London and New York: Mac Millan & Co – via Internet Archive.
