= Women's National Anti-Suffrage League =

UK organisation opposing votes for women

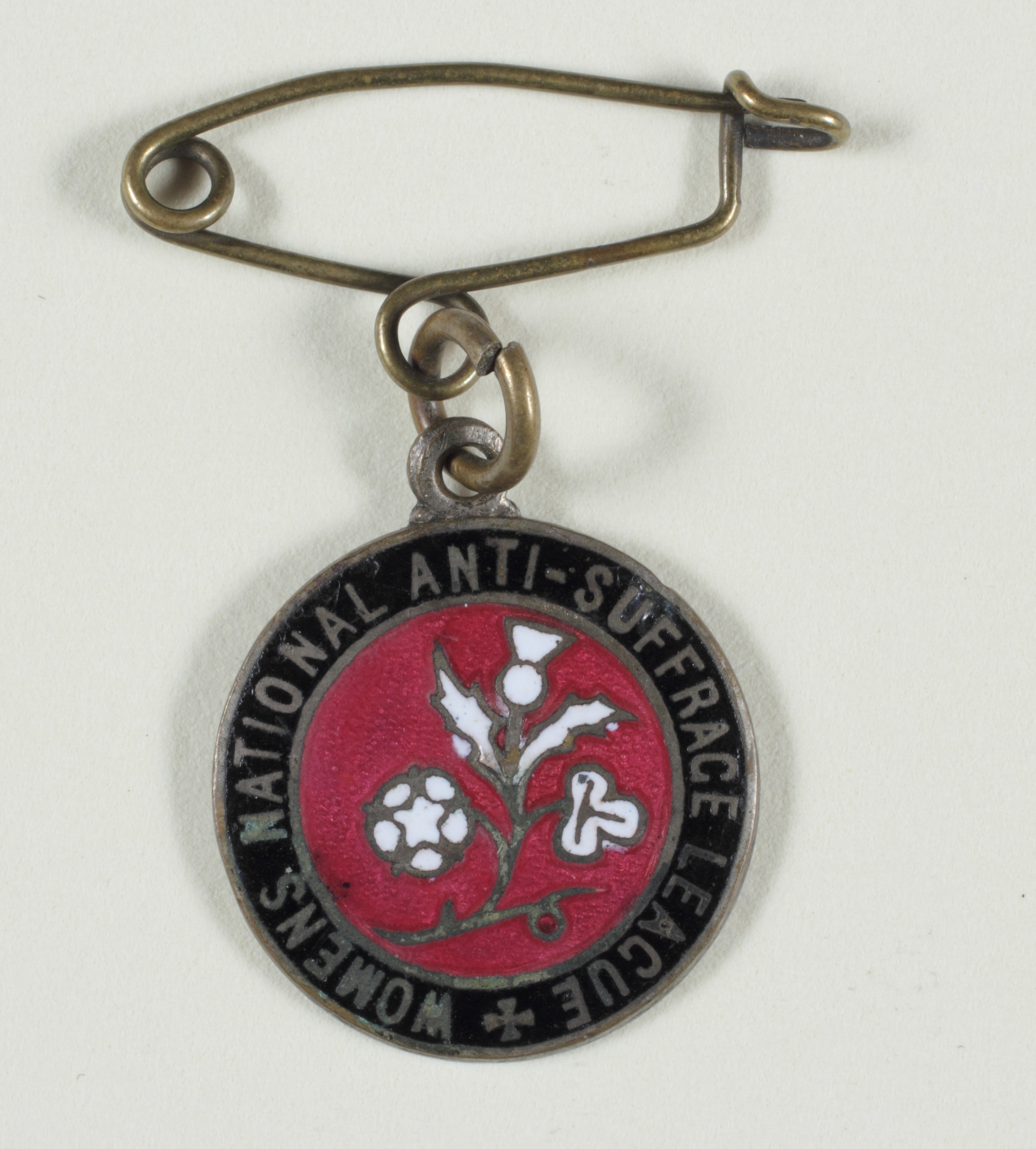
Women's National Anti-Suffrage League badge

The Women's National Anti-Suffrage League (1908–18) was established in London on 21 July 1908. Its aims were to oppose women being granted the vote in parliamentary elections, although it did support their having votes in local government elections. It was founded at a time when there was a resurgence of support for the women's suffrage movement.

== Origins ==
An anti-suffrage correspondence had taken place in the pages of The Times through 1906–07, with further calls for leadership of the anti-suffrage movement being placed in The Spectator in February 1908. Possibly as early as 1907, a letter was circulated to announce the creation of a National Women's Anti-Suffrage Association and inviting recipients to become a member of the Central Organising Committee or a member. It was issued under the names of thirty peeresses who became prominent anti-suffragists, as well as a number of peers and MPs. However, the first meeting of the Women's National Anti-Suffrage League only took place the following year on 21 July, at the Westminster Palace Hotel with Lady Jersey in the chair. Seventeen people were nominated to the central committee at this meeting, including Mrs Humphry Ward in the chair of the Literary Committee and Gertrude Bell as secretary. Other members were Mrs Frederic Harrison (Ethel Bertha Harrison), Sophia Lonsdale, Violet Markham, Beatrice Chamberlain and Hilaire Belloc MP.

== Aims ==
The League's aims were to oppose women being granted the parliamentary franchise, though it did support their having votes in local and municipal elections. It published the Anti-Suffrage Review from December 1908 until 1918. It gathered 337,018 signatures on an anti-suffrage petition, and founded the first local branch in Hawkenhurst in Kent. The first London branch was established in South Kensington under the auspices of Mary Fox-Strangways, Countess of Ilchester. Soon after, a branch of the League was formed in Dublin in 1909. In May 1910, a Scottish branch was organised into the Scottish National Anti-Suffrage League by Violet Graham, Duchess of Montrose. By December of that year there were 26 branches or sub-branches in the country, a total which grew to 82 by April 1909 and 104 in July 1910. It was announced that 2000 subscriptions had been received by Dec 1908, rising to 9000 in July 1909.

The League's manifesto contained the following arguments against granting the Parliamentary vote to women:

(a) Because the spheres of men and women, owing to natural causes, are essentially different, and therefore their share in the public management of the State should be different.

(b) Because the complex modern State depends for its very existence on naval and military power, diplomacy, finance, and the great mining, constructive, shipping and transport industries, in none of which can women take any practical part. Yet it is upon these matters, and the vast interests involved in them, that the work of Parliament largely turns.

(c) Because by the concession of the local government vote and the admission of women to County and Borough Councils, the nation has opened a wide sphere of public work and influence to women, which is within their powers. To make proper use of it, however, will tax all the energies that women have to spare, apart from the care of the home and the development of the individual life.

(d) Because the influence of women in social causes will be diminished rather than increased by the possession of the Parliamentary vote. At present they stand, in matters of social reform, apart from and beyond party politics, and are listened to accordingly. The legitimate influence of women in politics – in all classes, rich and poor – will always be in proportion to their education and common sense. But the deciding power of the Parliamentary vote should be left to men, whose physical force is ultimately responsible for the conduct of the State.

(e) Because all the reforms which are put forward as reasons for the vote can be obtained by other means than the vote, as is proved by the general history of the laws relating to women and children during the past century. The channels of public opinion are always freely open to women. Moreover, the services which women can with advantage render to the nation in the field of social and educational reform, and in the investigation of social problems, have been recognised by Parliament. Women have been included in Royal Commissions, and admitted to a share in local government. The true path of progress seems to lie in farther development along these lines. Representative women, for instance, might be brought into closer consultative relation with Government departments, in matters where the special interests of women are concerned.

(f) Because any measure for the enfranchisement of women must either (1) concede the vote to women on the same terms as to men, and thereby in practice involve an unjust and invidious limitation; or (2) by giving the vote to wives of voters tend to the introduction of political differences into domestic life; or (3) by the adoption of adult suffrage, which seems the inevitable of admitting the principle, place the female vote in an overpowering majority.

(g) Because, finally, the danger which might arise from the concession of woman-suffrage, in the case of a State burdened with such complex and far-reaching responsibilities as England, is out of all proportion to the risk run by those smaller communities which have adopted it. The admission to full political power of a number of voters debarred by nature and circumstances from the average political knowledge and experience open to men, would weaken the central governing forces of the State, and be fraught with peril to the country.

== Merger ==
In 1910, the group amalgamated with the Men's National League for Opposing Women's Suffrage to form the National League for Opposing Woman Suffrage with Lord Cromer as president and Lady Jersey as vice-president. The merger was in effect a takeover, with the president of the former organisation, Lord Cromer, becoming president of the new one. In 1912 Lord Curzon and Lord Weardale became joint presidents. The organisation continued its activities and the publication of the Anti-Suffrage Review until 1918 when both came to an end as women's suffrage was granted by the Representation of the People Act 1918.

== Archives ==
The archives of the Women's National Anti-Suffrage League are held at The Women's Library at the London School of Economics.

== See also ==
- Anti-Franchise League, formed in Australia in 1900
- Timeline of women's suffrage
- Women's suffrage in the United Kingdom
