= Austin Harrison =

British journalist and editor

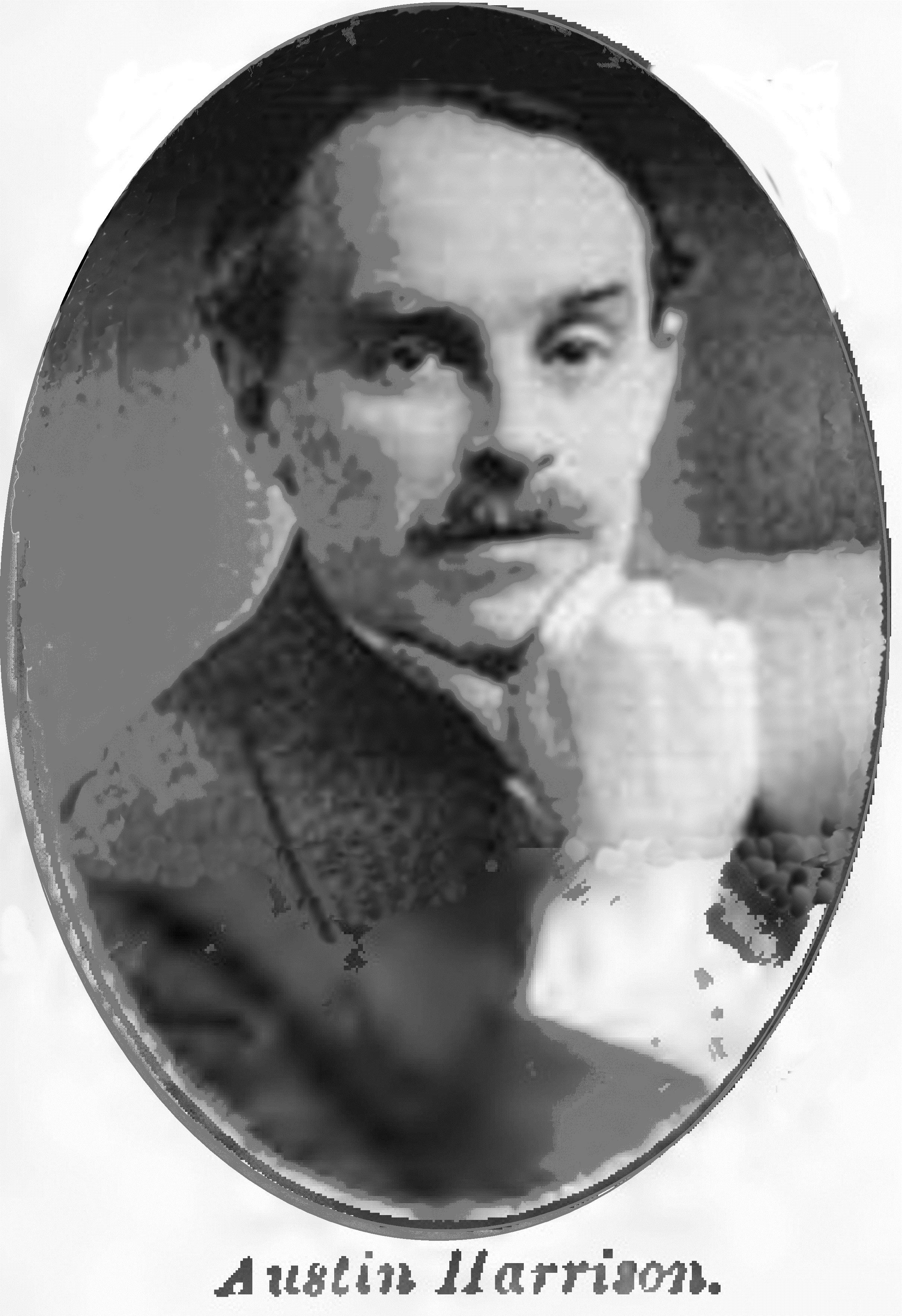
- ca. 1915
- Born: Austin Frederic Harrison; 27 March 1873; London, England
- Died: 13 July 1928 (aged 55); Seaford, East Sussex, England
- Education: St Paul's School; Harrow School
- Occupations: Author, journalist and editor
- Spouse: Mary Medora Greening (1914–1928)
- Parents: Frederic Harrison (father); Ethel Bertha Harrison (mother)

Austin Frederic Harrison (27 March 1873 – 13 July 1928) was a British journalist and editor, best known for his editorship of The English Review from 1909 until 1923.

== Biography ==
=== Early life and career ===
Born in London, Harrison was the son of the author and jurist Frederic Harrison and his wife Ethel Bertha Harrison. Initially tutored by George Gissing, Harrison attended St Paul's School and Harrow School. After leaving school, he went to Switzerland and Germany to study foreign languages in preparation for the Foreign Office exam, which he subsequently failed. With a career in the civil service now unlikely, Harrison's father used his connections to find his son a position with The Times. Harrison was sent to their Berlin bureau, but he soon ran afoul of their bureau chief and was dismissed. He later found positions with the Manchester Guardian and Reuters, where he enjoyed greater success.

Chafing at the restrictions imposed by the German foreign ministry, Harrison resigned from Reuters in 1904 and expressed his concerns about the Kaiser in his first book, The Pan-Germanic Doctrine. Returning to London, he worked briefly as a freelance journalist until he was offered the editorship of The Observer by Lord Northcliffe, the weekly newspaper's new owner. Harrison proved an able editor, using his position to warn his readers of the growing threat posed by the German empire to British security. Yet the paper continued to lose money, prompting Northcliffe to replace Harrison with J. L. Garvin at the end of 1907. Despite his dismissal, Harrison remained with The Observer as literary editor, simultaneously working at the Northcliffe-owned Daily Mail as drama critic.

=== Editorship of The English Review ===
At the end of 1908, Harrison accepted an offer from Alfred Mond to assume the editorship of the newly acquired literary magazine The English Review. Recently started by the author Ford Madox Huffner (later Ford), it had proved critically successful but a business failure. Though his practices irritated some, Harrison soon boosted circulation, which had been at only 1,000 when he assumed the editorship, to 18,000 by 1911. Such was his success that he bought out Mond in 1915, assuming ownership while continuing to serve as editor. During this time he broadened the range of contributors, publishing works by authors as diverse as Anton Chekhov, Hermann Hesse, Katherine Mansfield, Aleister Crowley, Edward Gordon Craig, George Bernard Shaw, and William Butler Yeats.

Politics was also a topic addressed in the pages of The English Review, and Harrison continued to warn readers about the threat posed by Germany in the years leading up to The First World War. The death of one of his brothers at the Battle of Festubert turned the Liberal editor into a passionate critic of the government during the subsequent munitions scandal. Harrison also supported a lenient peace with Germany; the harsh terms offered by Prime Minister David Lloyd George in 1918 drove Harrison to run against Lloyd George in the prime minister's own borough in the "coupon" election that December.

=== Final years ===
Harrison helped to found International PEN in 1921. Two years later, he sold The English Review to focus on writing books, though he published occasional journalism as well. Harrison died in 1928 at his home in Sussex from bronchopneumonia.

== Works ==
- The Pan-Germanic Doctrine (1904)
- Memories and Thoughts (1906)
- The Kaiser's War (1914)
- Lifting Mist (1924)
- Pandora's Hope (1925)
- Frederic Harrison: Thoughts and Memories (1925)

Media offices
Preceded by Rachel Beer	Editor of The Observer; 1904–1908	Succeeded by James Louis Garvin
Preceded by Ford Madox Hueffer	Editor of The English Review; 1909–1923	Succeeded by Ernest Remnant
