= Ethel Bertha Harrison =

British essayist (1851–1916)

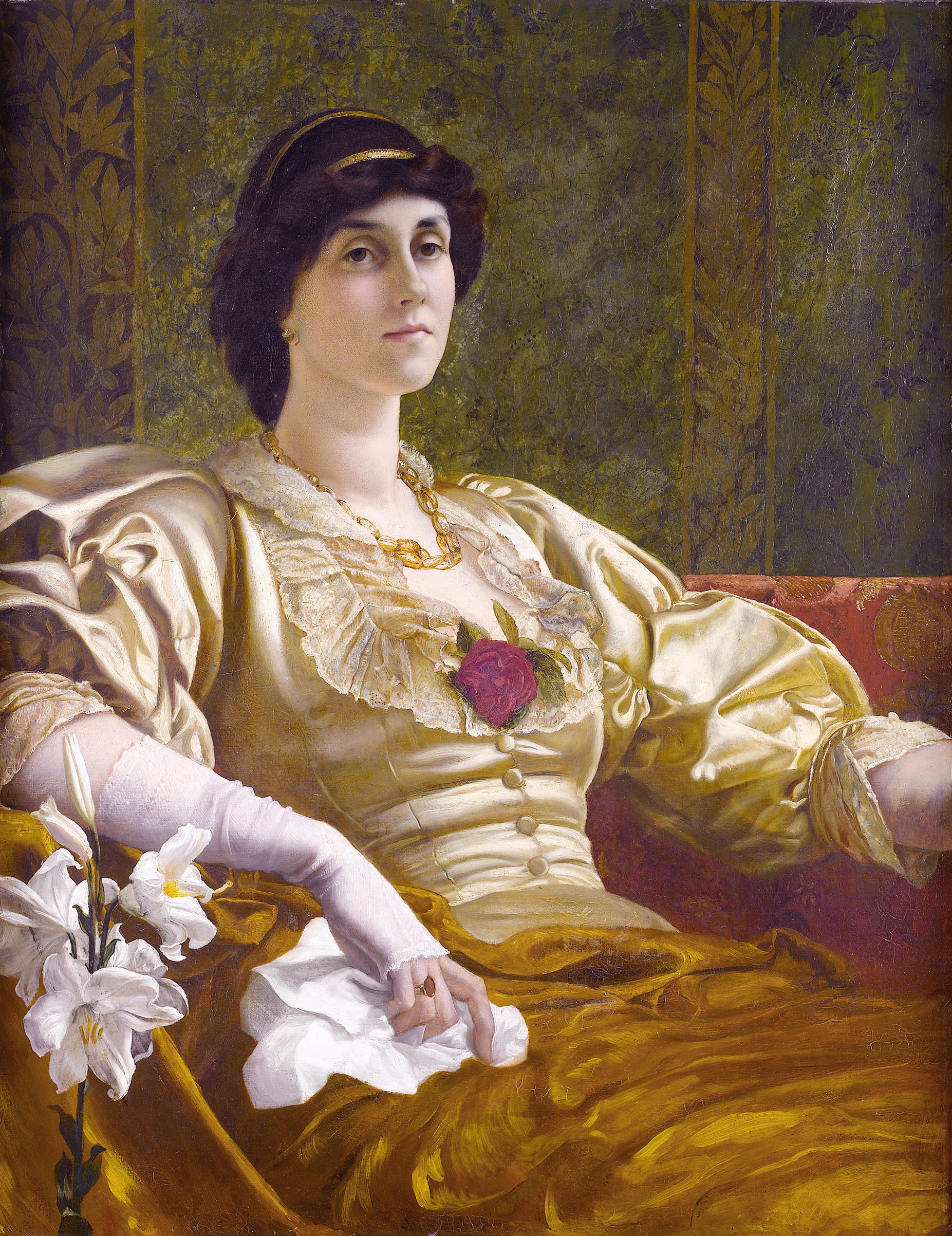
- by (later Sir) William Blake Richmond
- Born: 27 October 1851; London
- Died: 1916 (aged 64–65)
- Occupation: writer
- Spouse: Frederic Harrison (m. 1870–1916)
- Children: 4
- Relatives: Austin Harrison (son)
- Writing career

Ethel Bertha Harrison (27 October 1851 – 1916) was a British anti-suffrage essayist.

== Life ==
Harrison was born in London in 1851 to a merchant William Harrison and Anne Tonge Lake. They were a rich couple owing to trade with the West Indies and they had their daughter educated at home in their house in Highgate Hill in London. Ethel married Frederic Harrison in 1870. During the 1870s they had four sons including Austin Harrison. Her husband was a lawyer who was known for his support of the emerging idea of trade unions. Harrison was not a feminist and she was a member of the Women's National Anti-Suffrage League.

In 1885 she donated a Greek marble statuette that dates from about 150 bce to the British Museum. The sculpture is about 22 cm high and was said to have been excavated at Piraeus.

In 1883 and 1900 William Blake Richmond exhibited his portrait of "Mrs Frederick Harrison" lent from her husband's collection. The portrait features a rose at her cleavage which was said to be part of Richmond's signature on his work. This painting was resold in 2010 for £9,000.

Like her husband Ethel was an enthusiastic positivist and she organised a Women's Guild at Newton Hall. She arranged classes on home-making, social events and worship at the hall. She wrote twelve inspirational verses for a hymnal titled "Services of Man" which she also produced.

She was a committed correspondent writing letters to various contacts whom she shared with her husband. During the 1890s she started to write for publication and she had work accepted by The Cornhill Magazine.

She died in 1916. Some of her correspondence is at the London School of Economics and Political Science.
