= Harry James Powell =

British glassmaker

Harry James Powell CBE
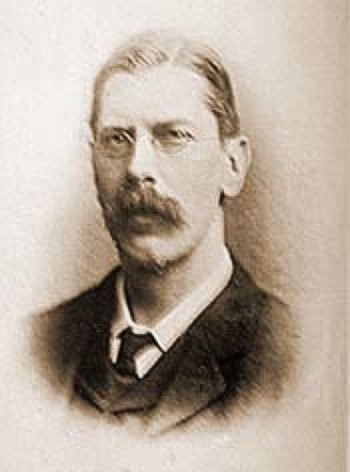
- Harry James Powell 1875
- Born: 24 January 1853; Walthamstow, Essex, England
- Died: 26 November 1922 (aged 69); Dulwich, England
- Education: Trinity College, Oxford
- Known for: Glassmaking
- Movement: Arts and Crafts
- Awards: Knight Commander of the Order of the British Empire

Harry James Powell CBE (24 January 1853 – 26 November 1922) was a British glassmaker associated with the Arts and Crafts movement. He was manager and chief glassmaker of James Powell and Sons from 1875 to 1919. He is best known for his innovations in the production of vessel glass, his contributions of new, medieval-like glass to the Arts and Crafts Movement, and the invention of innovative glass materials designed for the war effort during World War I.

== Biography ==
Harry James Powell was the grandson of James Powell, owner of James Powell and Sons Glass Company (originally known as Whitefriars Glassworks) in London. Powell graduated from Trinity College, Oxford in 1873, where he studied mechanics, physics and chemistry.

Powell was hired at the glass company in 1873, and managed the company from 1875 until his retirement in 1919. He was made a partner of the firm in 1893. Powell was chief designer of glassware. His intricate designs for vases, bowls and glassware had a strong following, as interest and demand soared for glass, first in the Arts and Crafts style and later in the Art Nouveau style.

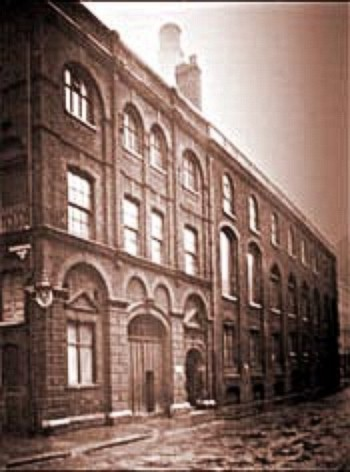
Whitefriars Glassworks, Tudor Street, London

From the beginning of his career, Powell studied the history of glass and glass making. He scientifically analyzed historic glassware and would to try to recreate the old glass. He also investigated new kinds of glass. Powell discovered that by exposing glass to higher temperatures, he could change its colour in dramatic ways. By 1877, Powell had produced new opalescent glass, a milky opaque straw opal and blue opal, which were well received in America.

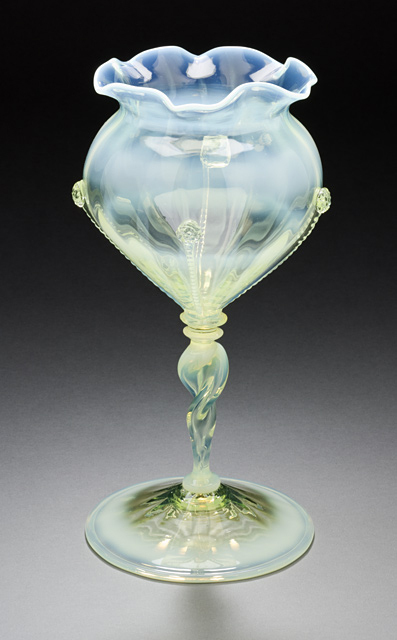
Glass goblet designed by Powell 1895

In the early 1890s, Powell was experimenting with new glass colours, trying to replicate medieval glass, for use in the mosaics designed by William Blake Richmond for St Paul's Cathedral. The new, heavier glass, often with light veins of colour, expanded the company's glass palette and was highly favoured by artists of the Arts and Crafts Movement. Powell kept records of his experiments, and made detailed notes of his impressions and work in notebooks, which are preserved in the British Museum.

At the beginning of the 20th century, Powell applied his scientific knowledge to create products that were used in science, industry and the war effort in the First World War. His innovations included X-ray tubes, light bulbs, and new types of thermometer. "His development of toughened glass for thermometer tubes, optical glass and ultimately for toughened glass for use on naval mines in World War I earned him his CBE, but brought the company through the difficult war years and able to expand vigorously afterwards".

In 1919, Powell retired from the company. He was made a Commander of the Order of the British Empire for his services during the First World War, which included the products he developed for the war effort. Powell died at his home in Dulwich on 26 November 1922. He was buried in Gerrards Cross, Buckinghamshire.

His book Glass Making in England was posthumously published in 1923.
