= National League for Opposing Woman Suffrage =

UK organization opposing votes for women

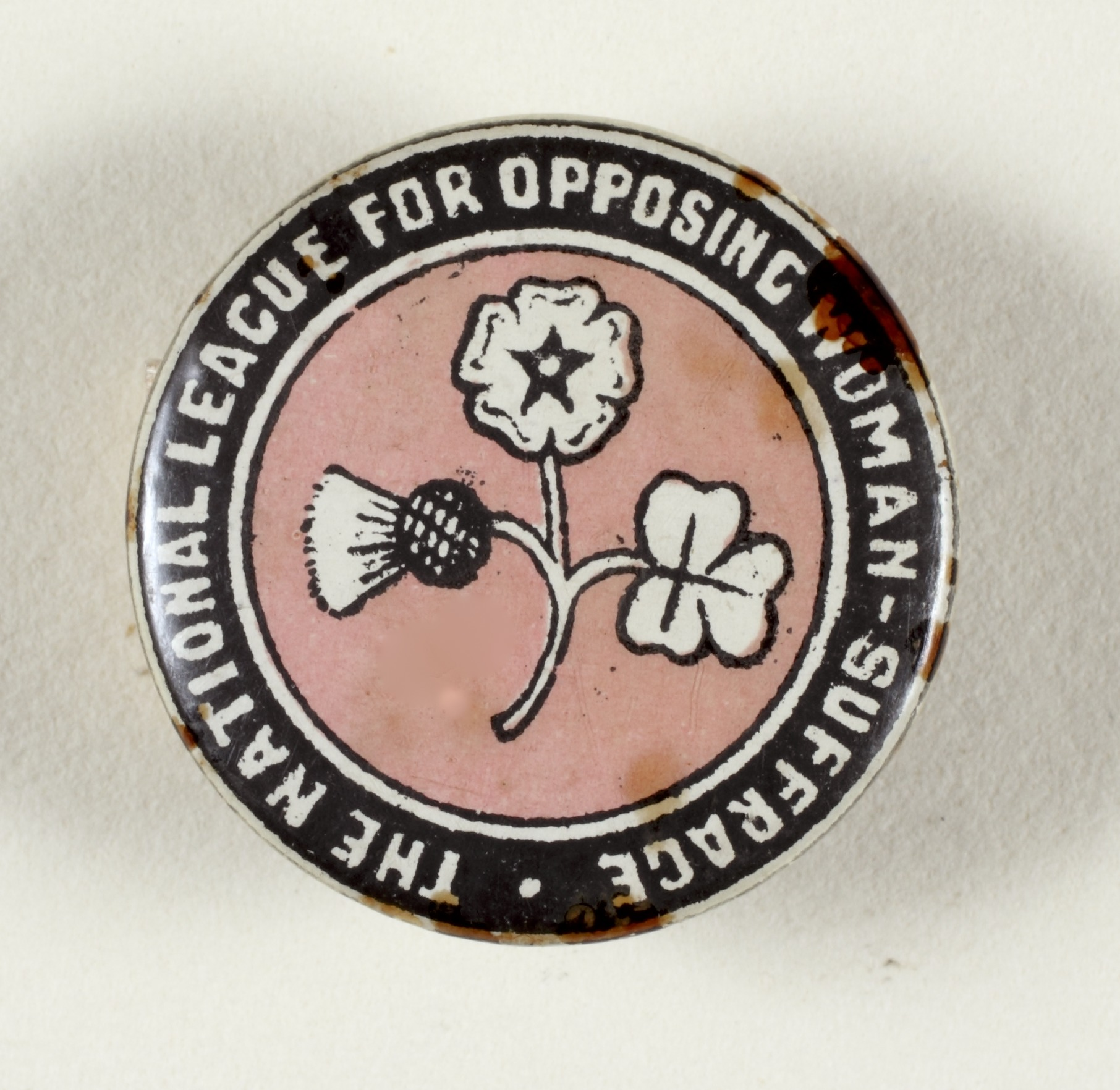
National League for Opposing Woman-Suffrage badge

The National League for Opposing Woman Suffrage was founded in London in December 1910 to oppose the extension of the voting franchise to women in the United Kingdom.

It was formed as an amalgamation of the Women's National Anti-Suffrage League and the Men's League for Opposing Woman Suffrage. Its first president was Lord Cromer, and its executive committee consisted of seven men and seven women. In March 1912 Cromer was replaced by Lord Curzon and Lord Weardale as joint presidents. It continued the publication of the Anti-Suffrage Review produced originally by the Women's National Anti-Suffrage League. In 1912 the first Welsh branch opened in Bangor, following an upsurge in militant action in the country.

The organisation and the Anti-Suffrage Review both ceased to exist following the passage of the Representation of the People Act 1918 which enfranchised some women over the age of 30.

== See also ==
- Anti-suffragism
