= Veranilda =

Posthumous novel by George Gissing

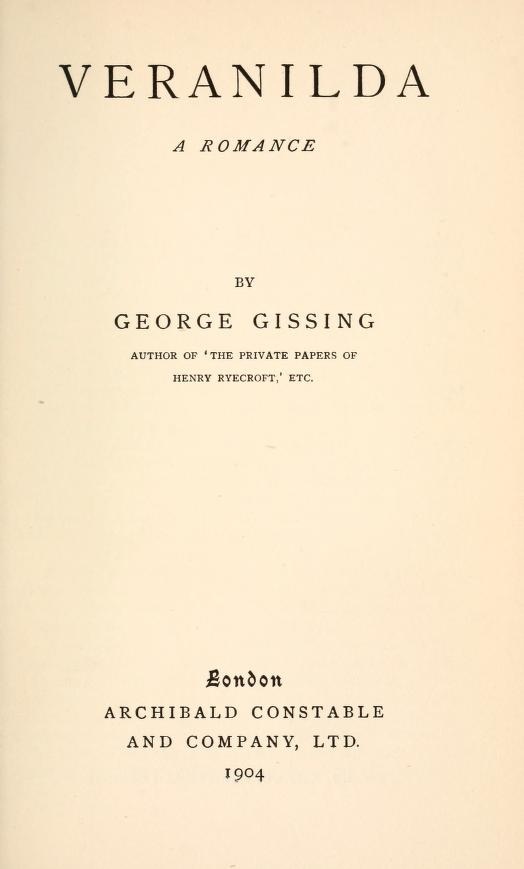
- Title page of the first edition.
- Author: George Gissing
- Language: English
- Publisher: Archibald Constable
- Publication date: 1904
- Publication place: England
- Pages: 348

Veranilda: A Romance is a posthumous novel by English author George Gissing. The book was left incomplete at the time of Gissing's death (28 December 1903) and it was first published in 1904 by Archibald Constable and Company.

== Publication ==
As an old friend of Gissing, H. G. Wells was asked to write an introduction to Veranilda. Displeased with the piece Wells wrote, Gissing's relatives and literary executors then asked Frederic Harrison to write a substitute. Well's rejected preface was later published under the title "George Gissing: An Impression".

== Other editions ==
- Veranilda. New York: E.P. Dutton & Company, 1905.
- Veranilda. London: Archibald Constable and Co., 1905.
- Veranilda. London: Oxford University Press, 1929.
- Veranilda. New York: AMS Press, 1968.
- Veranilda. Brighton: The Harvester Press, 1987, edited by Pierre Coustillas; ISBN 0-7108-0538-1
- Veranilda. Grayswood, Surrey: Grayswood Press, 2022, edited with an introduction by Markus Neacey, ISBN 978-1-7396203-1-8
