= Thomas Richmond (miniature-painter) =

English miniature-painter (1771–1837)

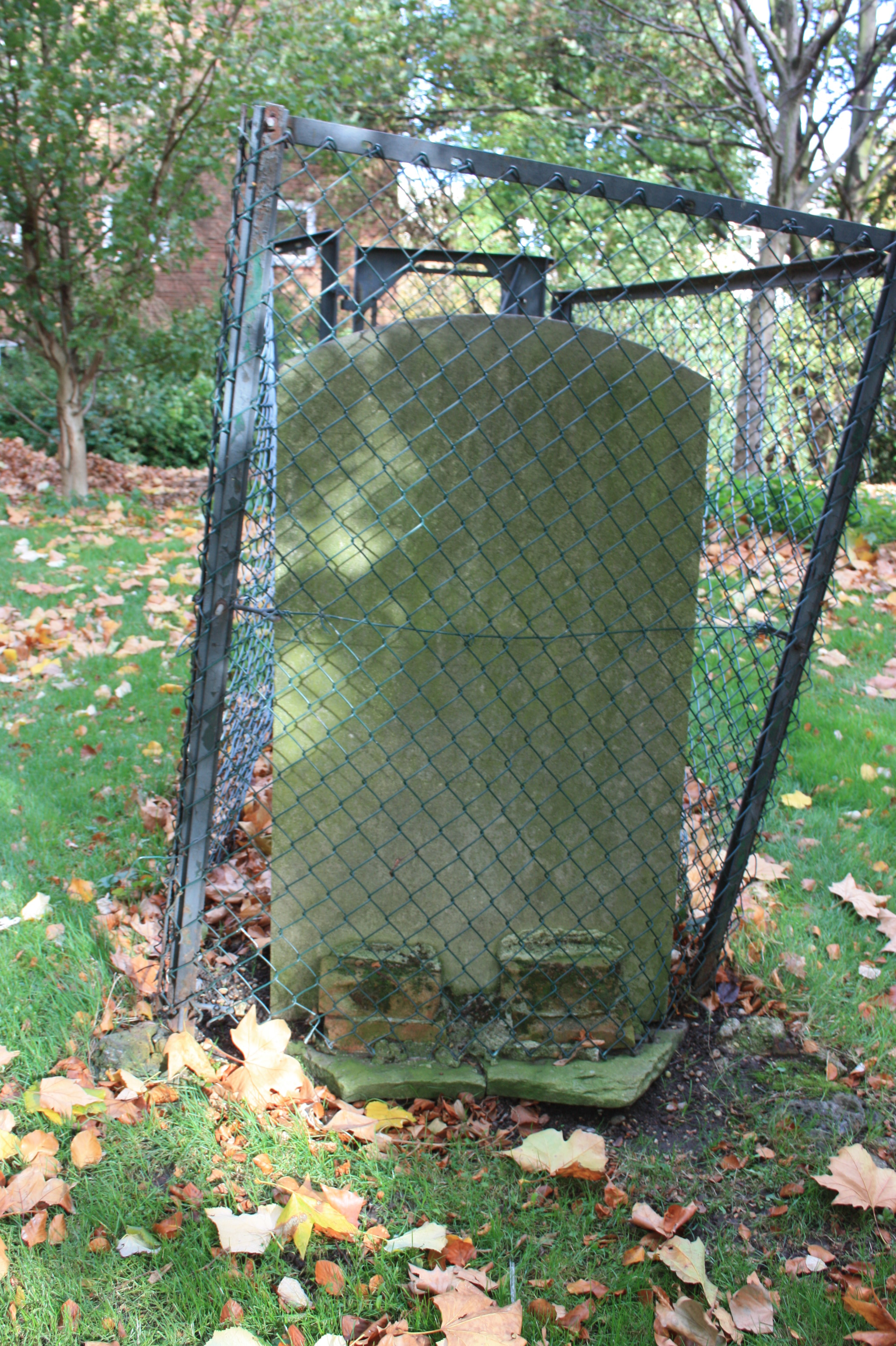
The grave of Thomas Richmond, St Marys Gardens, Paddington

Thomas Richmond (1771–1837) was an English miniature-painter.

== Life ==
He was son of Thomas Richmond, originally of Bawtry, and of an old Yorkshire family. His father was 'groom of the stables' to the Duke of Gloucester, and afterwards the proprietor of the Coach and Horses at Kew, where the artist was born in 1771. His mother, Ann Bone, was a cousin of George Engleheart, 'miniature-painter to the king.'

Thomas became Engleheart's pupil, and was employed by the royal family in copying miniatures by his master and Richard Cosway. He also copied in miniature size many of the portraits by Sir Joshua Reynolds in the royal collection. His original and unsigned miniatures are numerous. Some are on ivory, others are on paper, and in many cases full or half length, with the head in colours and the rest in pencil. Though the pose of some of his figures is in the stiff manner usual at the time, the portraits are lifelike, and the drawing and expression excellent.

In later years Richmond lived in the centre of fashion, 42 Half-Moon Street, Mayfair. From 1795 to 1825 he exhibited forty-six miniatures at the Royal Academy. One of his miniatures, a portrait of his wife (Ann Oram), painted in 1808, was engraved by William Holl, jun.

His eldest son, also named Thomas Richmond, was born in 1802. His younger son, George Richmond, inherited many of his works. Both of his children also became noted artists.

He died in 1837, and was buried in Paddington churchyard. He lies in the large western section changed into a public park (St Marys Gardens) in 1881. Although most stones were cleared during this process, Richmond's grave remains, lying to the north-west, however its value is greatly diminished by having been recently enclosed within an ugly metal cage.
