= Thomas Richmond =

English painter

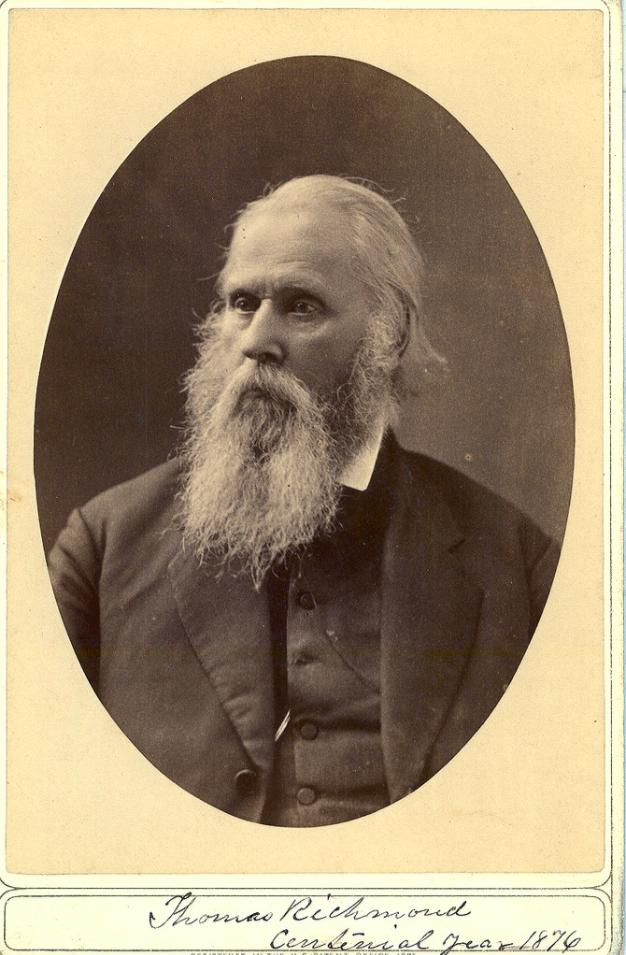
Thomas Richmond

Thomas Richmond (1802–1874) was a British portrait painter, known for his idealised pictures in the so-called keepsake style. He was the son of Thomas Richmond (1771–1837), the miniature painter, and the brother of George Richmond.

Richmond initially practiced in Sheffield, and later moved to London. His main clientele was among the hunting fraternity. Between 1833 and 1860 he exhibited fifty one portraits in London. He exhibited forty-five portraits at the Royal Academy and six at the Suffolk Street gallery. Richmond's paintings are close in style to his father's work, but distinguished by the characteristic use of dark stippling in the background. His paintings were criticised for their overly idealised and sugary presentations of subjects, especially women. When John Ruskin's father commissioned Richmond to paint his daughter-in-law Effie Gray, Effie wrote of the finished work to her mother:

'...it is the most lovely piece of oil painting but much prettier than me. I look like a graceful Doll but John and his father are delighted with it'.

Richmond and his brother George had met Ruskin during his trip to Rome in 1840-1. He accompanied him on his visits to galleries. Ruskin's father was not as delighted with the portrait of Effie as she believed. He wrote to his son that Thomas was inferior as an artist to his brother: "Tom I regret to say cannot hold a candle to George - It is second rate or lower".

Richmond died in 1874 at Windermere, where he had purchased an estate, but was buried in Brompton cemetery, London.
