= Alice Chittenden =

Alice Chittenden may refer to:

- Alice Brown Chittenden (1859–1944), American painter
- Alice Hill Chittenden (1869–1945), American anti-suffrage leader, civic organiser, and Red Cross executive
