= Bertha Lane Scott =

American anti-suffragist and socialite (1860–1938)

- Born: Bertha Francis Lane; October 1860; Cincinnati, Ohio, U.S.
- Died: July 17, 1938 (aged 77); San Mateo, California, U.S.
- Burial place: Saint John's Cemetery, San Mateo, California, U.S.
- Occupation(s): Anti-suffrage activist, socialite, Police officer
- Known for: Chairman of the Publications Committee, New York State Association Opposed to Woman Suffrage
- Spouse: William Forse Scott (m. 1884–1933)
- Children: 1
- Parent(s): Col. Philander Parmele Lane (father); Sophia Bosworth Lane (mother)
- Relatives: Dr. Lucia M. Lane (sister)

Bertha Lane Scott (born Bertha Francis Lane; October 1860 – July 17, 1938) was an American anti-suffragist, socialite, and civic volunteer. She is sometimes credited as Mrs. William Forse Scott and she is best known for heading the Publications Committee of the New York State Association Opposed to Woman Suffrage (NYSAOWS); she produced pamphlets, open letters, and newspaper essays that argued women’s political participation would undermine family life and was unnecessary because, she maintained, men already represented women’s interests. A sought-after speaker, Scott helped found anti-suffrage societies across the United States and regularly testified before the New York Legislature against removing the word “male” from the state’s suffrage clause. Outside her activism she was prominent in Yonkers society and, in 1918, became that city’s first (honorary) policewoman, charged with safeguarding children’s welfare.

== Biography ==
Bertha Francis Lane (née) was born in October 1860, in Cincinnati, Ohio. She is the daughter of Col. Philander Parmele Lane (1821–1899), noted Cincinnati manufacturer and mother Sophia Bosworth (1831–1921) in Cincinnati, Ohio. She received her education in Cincinnati, Boston, New York, and Europe. Her siblings were Lucia M. Lane; Harry M. Lane; George Lane; Laura (Lane) Thompson; Helen (Lane) McKaye; and Florence Lane.

She married William Forse Scott, an American Civil War veteran and author of The Story of a Cavalry Regiment (1893), detailing the service of the Fourth Iowa Veteran Volunteers. They obtained a marriage license on June 17, 1884 and had one child, Philip Lane Scott (b. 1896), who later worked as a construction engineer.

== Anti-suffrage activism ==
Scott, a supporter of woman suffrage, she had reversed her position by 1909 and was serving as vice-president of the Guidon Club, a New York–based anti-suffrage organization. As vice president, Scott traveled to Minnesota in November 1913 to establish local anti-suffrage organizations. Her efforts in the Minneapolis–Saint Paul area resulted in the formation of three groups by the end of 1913: the Minneapolis Association Opposed to the Further Extension of Suffrage to Women, the St. Paul Association Opposed to Woman Suffrage, and the Minnesota Association Opposed to Woman Suffrage, led by prominent women such as Lavinia Gilfillan, Ella Pennington, and Florence Carpenter. These women also engaged in philanthropic and educational initiatives alongside their political activism.

She acted as Chairman of the Publications Committee for the New York State Association Opposed to Woman Suffrage, founded in April 1895, Scott produced literature to counter the suffrage movement’s narrative. Her notable contribution included a letter published in The New York Times on June 2, 1912, titled “Business of Being Woman.” In it, she argued that women’s primary role was domestic, asserting that political involvement would disrupt family harmony and that men were better suited to represent women’s interests. This perspective aligned with anti-suffragists’ emphasis on traditional gender roles and family values.

Scott was also the movement’s most visible platform speaker. During the New York shirtwaist strike of 1909, which gained traction among wealthy suffragists, factory owners like Rosenthal Brothers & Co. enlisted Scott to address non-union women. Her speeches emphasized personal liberty, law, and order, countering the suffragists’ growing influence and reinforcing anti-union values. At a 1911 suffrage hearing in Albany, Scott delivered a rebuttal to suffragist leaders like Harriet May Mills and Dr. Anna Howard Shaw, arguing that women wielded sufficient influence without voting rights.

In 1910, Scott publicly debated suffragist leader Henrietta Wells Livermore at the Amackassin Club in Yonkers, an event held to raise funds for the Fairview Garden School. The debate drew significant local attention and marked Scott as a leading anti-suffragist voice in the city.

In the lead-up to the New York suffrage referendum, Scott’s writings were featured beyond her home state. The Milwaukee Free Press, an anti-suffrage-leaning newspaper in Wisconsin, included her work in a recurring Sunday feature titled Should Women Have the Ballot? during the summer and fall of 1912. Her arguments appeared alongside those of national suffragists such as Belle Case La Follette.

In January 1914, she responded critically to The Up-To-Date Woman, a suffragist publication circulated in Yonkers, sending a rebuttal letter to local newspapers. Her opposition placed her in direct contrast with Livermore and other prominent suffrage advocates in the region.

Scott also represented the anti-suffrage cause at a joint hearing of the Senate and Assembly Judiciary Committees at the New York State Capitol in Albany on February 24, 1914. Speaking before a packed Assembly chamber, she opposed removing the word “male” from the state constitution’s suffrage clause. In another letter to The New York Times in 1913, Scott criticized what she perceived as declining morality in women’s dress and behavior, linking it to broader cultural shifts influenced by international commerce and secular altruism. She warned that these changes, alongside diminishing respect for authority and religion, threatened representative government and traditional womanhood.

In 1915, Scott publicly criticized Katharine Bement Davis, a Progressive candidate advocating suffrage and political reform. While acknowledging Davis’s intelligence, Scott argued that her “womanly qualities” made her unfit for public office.

== Marriage, civic service, and death ==
A marriage license issued by the Probate Court of Hamilton County, Ohio, documents the union of William Forse Scott and Bertha Frances Lane on June 17, 1884. Both were residents of Hamilton County at the time, and their application was formally sworn before the judge of the probate court. The license affirms that there were no legal objections to the marriage and that both parties were of lawful age. The ceremony was performed by Rev. W. W. Lyle, a Minister of the Gospel.

On June 17th 1918, Bertha Lane Scott was the City of Yonkers' first policewoman, appointed by Mayor William J. Wallin. Though she would serve without pay and not wear a uniform, she was granted the same powers as other members of the police force. Her specific role was to safeguard the children of Yonkers.

According to the 1920 United States Census, the Scott household resided at 87 Depew Street in Yonkers, New York. The head of the household, William F. Scott, was 62 years old, married, born in Pennsylvania, and worked as a lawyer in general practice. His wife, Bertha L. Scott, age 59, was born in Ohio. Their son, Philip L. Scott, 23, was single, born in New York, and employed as a construction engineer. According to the census, both William and Bertha Scott’s parents were born in the United States.

Bertha Lane Scott died on July 17, 1938, in San Mateo, California, at the home of her sister, Dr. Lucia M. Lane. She was the widow of New York attorney William Forse Scott and a member of a prominent Cincinnati family. At the time of her death, she was survived by her son, Philip Scott, and several sisters. Her father, Col. Philander Parmele Lane, had been a noted manufacturer in Cincinnati.

== Bibliography ==
- In Opposition To Woman Suffrage [Pamphlet] — NYSAOWS (1909)
- The Book of Woman's Power — Funk & Wagnalls Company (1911)
- Woman's Relation to Government — North American Review (1910)
- Business of Being Woman — New York Times (1912)
- Woman and Government — The Woman's Protest (May 1912)
- Immorality in Dress — New York Times (1913)
- Constitutional Changes — New York Times (1913)
