= Alice Hill Chittenden =

American anti-suffrage leader and civic volunteer (1869–1945)

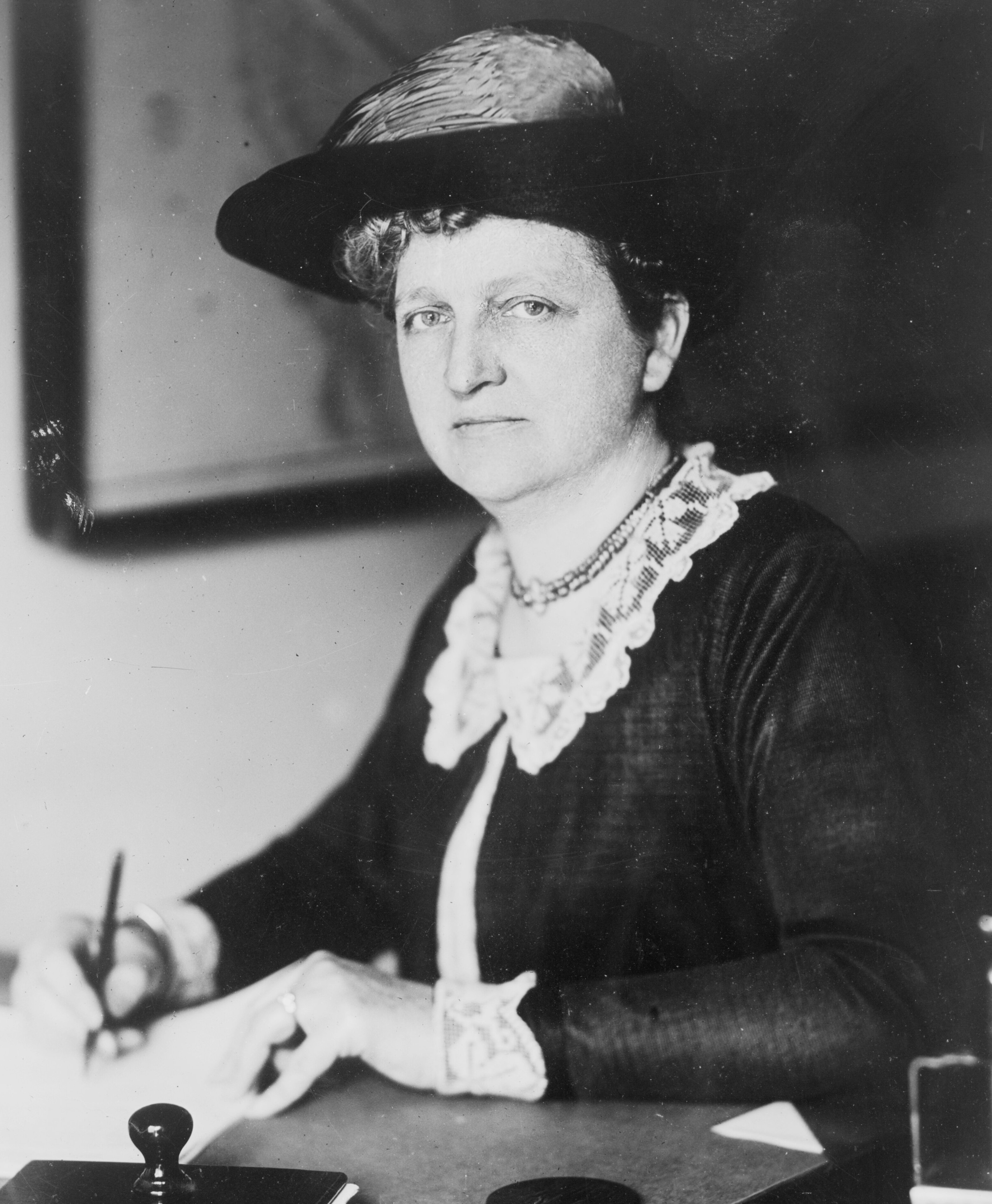
- Chittenden, c. 1915
- Born: Alice Hill Chittenden; June 27, 1869; Brooklyn, New York City, U.S.
- Died: October 2, 1945 (aged 76); Manhattan, New York City, U.S.
- Education: Anna Brackett’s School; Miss Porter’s School
- Occupations: Civic leader, political activist
- Years active: 1909–1945
- Organization(s): • New York State Association Opposed to Woman Suffrage (president, 1913–1917) • Women's National Republican Club (co-founder; president, 1926–1927) • American Red Cross – New York Chapter (secretary, 1934–1945)
- Notable work: “Ballot Not a Panacea for Existing Evils” (1913 broadside)
- Political party: Republican
- Parent(s): Simeon Baldwin Chittenden; Mary Hill Chittenden
- Relatives: Simeon B. Chittenden (grandfather)

Alice Hill Chittenden (June 27, 1869 – October 2, 1945) was an American anti-suffrage leader, civic organiser, and Red Cross executive. As president of the New York State Association Opposed to Woman Suffrage (1913–1917) she coordinated the campaign that defeated the state’s 1915 woman-suffrage referendum. During and after World War I she redirected her focus to war-relief work, rising to secretary of the New York Red Cross, and co-founded the Women’s National Republican Club, for which she campaigned and fund-raised into the 1940s.

== Early life and family ==
Alice Hill Chittenden was born in Brooklyn on June 27, 1869. She was the oldest child of Mary Hill Chittenden and Simeon Baldwin Chittenden, an attorney and son of U.S. Congressman Simeon B. Chittenden.

The family was financially secure. Alice attended Anna Brackett's school in Brooklyn. Brackett had endorsed women's suffrage in 1894. She then attended Miss Porter’s college preparatory school in Farmington, Connecticut, from 1886 to 1888.

On April 8, 1895, Chittenden's mother Mary Hill Chittenden became one of the founding members of the New York State Association Opposed to Woman Suffrage (NYSAOWS).

== Pre-war political work ==
As New York's suffrage campaign gained momentum after Susan B. Anthony's death, Chittenden argued in 1909 that "there is no economy in having two people do the same work." She also argued that suffrage as an idea was petering out, since no state had granted the women the vote since Colorado in 1893. In 1910, she spoke on the issue to the General Federation of Women’s Clubs in Cincinnati. In 1911 she, along with 100 other anti-suffragists, participated in a publicity stunt by riding a train from New York City to Albany to observe a hearing on suffrage.

Alice Chittenden became president of NYSAOWS in January 1913, and held the position until December 1917. Chittenden lead the New York State Association Opposed to Women's Suffrage. She believed women's suffrage would not meaningfully change anything, other than increasing the work expected of women. In this position, she organized against the 1915 referendum. She encouraged readers of the NYSAOWS's newspaper Woman Patriot to aggressively lobby against suffrage, such as by attaching anti-suffrage literature whenever they mailed a letter or bill. In the summer of 1915, Chittenden traveled across the state speaking against the referendum, including at the New York State Fair.

Chittenden argued that men and women should have distinct roles and responsibilities. If given the vote, women would either vote carelessly and undermine government, or carefully, which would require education incompatible with traditional feminine roles. Chittenden warned that, if the referendum passed, "the whole social structure of our state will be weakened" in a "social cataclysm". She advocated a suffrage referendum in which only women could vote, as she believed women would reject it. However, Chittenden did not oppose women holding political office, and specifically approved of Katherine B. Davis. She felt that women's inability to vote made them nonpartisan and better able to serve the public.

In November 1915, the referendum failed. 57% of votes were against it, a greater margin of defeat than Chittenden anticipated. In light of this defeat, Chittenden lobbied newspapers, which mostly supported suffrage, to provide more neutral coverage of the issue. Anti-suffragists began writing their own news material and sending it to newspapers to publish.

In February 1916, the New York state legislature considered passing an amendment to guarantee women's suffrage. Chittenden criticized this decision, saying it was insulting to reconsider the issue so soon after the referendum.

In September 1917, Woodrow Wilson and others in the federal government supported women's suffrage as a war measure. There was also a second referendum in New York state. On November 7, 1917, the second referendum (open only to men) passed with 54% of the vote. After the referendum, at the November 15 meeting of the NYSAOWS, Chittenden encouraged anti-suffragists to join political parties. She also urged them to support the National Association Opposed to Woman Suffrage and oppose a federal suffrage amendment. The NYSAOWS reorganized into the New York State Women Voters' Anti-Suffrage Party, of which Chittenden was elected Vice President.

== Red Cross activity ==
During World War I, the NYSAOWS supported the Red Cross, raising funds and allowing the organization use of its headquarters. Alice Chittenden herself joined the National League for Women's Service and, working with both pro- and anti-suffragists, by Fall 1917 raised $46,000 for the Red Cross. She and other anti-suffragists accused suffragists of disloyalty for continuing to campaign during wartime.

Over the course of 1918, Chittenden reduced her involvement in anti-suffrage politics to join the Red Cross directly. Her service sent her to Chicago, Halifax, Issoudun, Vichy, and Koblenz. When the war ended, she became president of the Overseas Service League of Red Cross Personnel from 1921–1922. In 1932, she joined the Executive Committee of the New York Red Cross and became Assistant Secretary. Two years later, she was elected as Secretary of the New York Red Cross, a position she held until her death in 1945.

== Post-war political work and death ==
After the war, Chittenden believed that she and other women had a duty to exercise their new voting right. She joined the Republican Party. After the 1920 election, she founded the Women's National Republican Club alongside Henrietta Wells Livermore and Pauline Morton Sabin. She was on the Board of Governors from 1924-1944, and President of the club from 1926—1927. Chitterden spent 25 years campaigning and fundraising for Republican candidates, including Leonard Wood, Calvin Coolidge, and Herbert Hoover. Chittenden opposed the 18th and 19th amendments, arguing that the federal government was encroaching on questions that should be handled by the states, and advocated for making the constitution more difficult to amend.

Chittenden never married. She died on October 2, 1945 in Doctors Hospital in Manhattan.
