= Woman Patriot Corporation =

American anti-suffragist organization

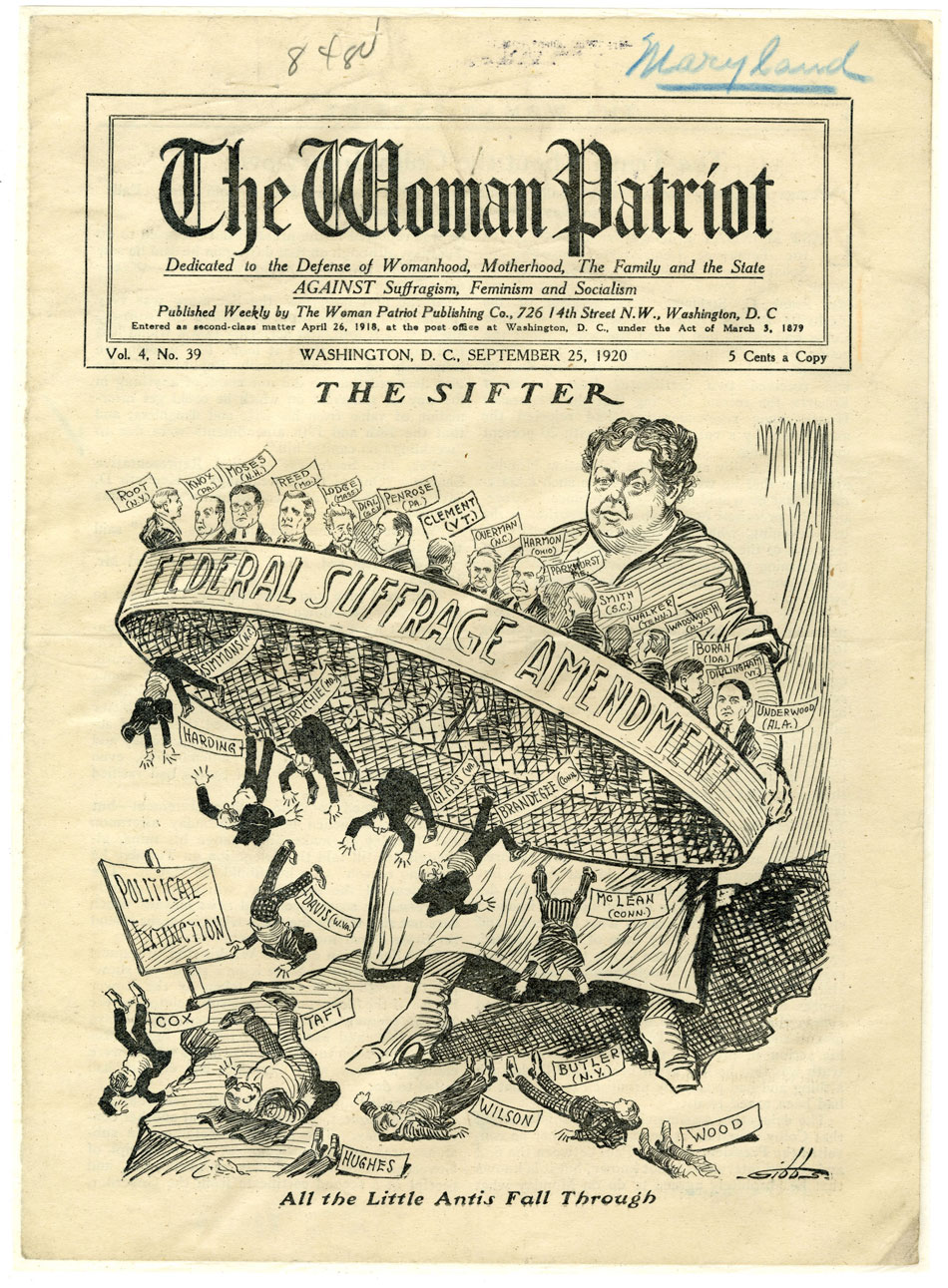
An issue of The Woman Patriot, an anti-suffragist publication previously associated with NAOWS and later with the WPC

The Woman Patriot Corporation (WPC) was an American Progressive Era organization formed by women who had been previously active in the National Association Opposed to Women's Suffrage. The group identified as anti-communist, anti-pacifist, and anti-feminist. The WPC was formed in response to the then-recent enfranchisement of women via the Nineteenth Amendment on August 26, 1920.

== Founding ==
The fear of conservative women at the time was the burgeoning feminist movement taking root in women's colleges which would allegedly plant the idea in men's minds that because women were now seen as independent, they could shirk their economic duties as providers.

== Leadership ==
In the late 1920s and 1930s, Harriet Frothingham (Mrs. Randolph Frothingham) (of Brookline, Massachusetts) was president of the WPC. Laura Hill (Mrs. John Fremont Hill) was the vice president of the organization, and Paula E. Lucas (Mrs. Lewis C. Lucas) from Washington, D.C., was the secretary-treasurer. As of 1932, the board of directors included Jane Baldwin Cotton (Mrs. Frederic Jay Cotton) of Boston, Cornelia Gibbs (Mrs. Rufus M. Gibbs) of Baltimore, Grace Freeman Gray (Mrs. James Cunningham Gray) of Boston, Mary Scully Killiam (Mrs. Paul Killiam) of Cambridge, Julia L. Longfellow (Mrs. Frederic W. Longfellow) of New York, Lillian Cutten Slattery (Mrs. Francis E. Slattery) of Brighton, and Mary G. Kilbreth. Kilbreth previously worked as the acting president of the New York State Association Opposed to Woman Suffrage.

== Activity ==
The WPC, having formed after World War I and during the First Red Scare, was allied against communism, anarchy, and pacifism (especially internationally). In the 1920s, Harriet Frothingham, who was then on the board of directors for the WPC, filed alongside the group with regards to a U.S. Supreme Court case called Massachusetts v. Mellon, consolidated with Frothingham v. Mellon.

The WPC had been compiling a list of individuals which they wanted barred from entering the United States, including George Bernard Shaw and the grandson of Karl Marx. They also filed a memorandum complaining of Albert Einstein's return to the United States. Einstein, a Jewish German-born American citizen and socialist pacifist, was targeted by the WPC, which attempted to bar his entry into the United States, and stated: "Einstein was not merely a pernicious influence; he was the ringleader of an anarcho-communist program whose aim was to shatter the military machinery of national governments as a preliminary for world revolution."

Frothingham claimed that Einstein was "affiliated with more anarchist and Communist groups than Josef Stalin himself", and said that letting Einstein into the United States would "allow anarchy to stalk in unmolested". Copies of Frothingham's letter urging the U.S. State Department to bar Einstein's entry to the United States were distributed to U.S. consuls. In response to these efforts, Einstein threatened to cancel his engagement with Princeton University if his visa were not issued within 24 hours. The visa was granted. In 1932, the WPC had Mary Kilbreth of its board of directors testify for the 72nd Congress, against federal legislation concerning birth control, which it considered to be immoral, claiming it a measure that would lead to population control and a tyrannical imposition of federal power over the states.
