= Russell B. Livermore =

American lawyer, politician and soldier

Russell Blake Livermore (March 22, 1894 – May 21, 1958) was an American lawyer, politician, and veteran of both World Wars. He was from New York.

== Life ==
Livermore was born on March 22, 1894, in Yonkers, New York, the son of Arthur Leslie Livermore and Henrietta Jackson Wells. Arthur worked as a lawyer in Yonkers. Henrietta was a prominent suffragist, a member of the board of directors for the National American Woman Suffrage Association, the founder and first president of the Women's National Republican Club, and the first woman vice-chair of the New York Republican State Committee.

Livermore graduated from Dartmouth College in 1915. While a student at Dartmouth, he was a member of Theta Delta Chi. He later received his law degree from Columbia.

During World War I, Livermore served as a First Lieutenant in the 104th Infantry, 26th Division. In July 1918, while advancing in an open field near Belleau Wood, France, his battalion came under fire from machine gun fire. He quickly gathered men from his platoon and led them on a charge to put the machine gun out of action. He captured eleven prisoners and saved his battalion. For his service, he received the Distinguished Service Cross, the citation for which reads:

The President of the United States of America, authorized by Act of Congress, July 9, 1918, takes pleasure in presenting the Distinguished Service Cross to First Lieutenant (Infantry) Russell B. Livermore, United States Army, for extraordinary heroism in action while serving with 104th Infantry Regiment, 26th Division, A.E.F., near the Bois-de-Belleau, France, 18 July 1918. As his battalion was advancing across an open field, it came under fire from a hostile machine gun located in a strong enfilading position in a ravine. Hastily gathering a group of men from his platoon, Lieutenant Livermore led them in a charge on the nest and put it out of action, capturing eleven prisoners and saving his battalion many casualties.

In 1921, Livermore was elected to the New York State Assembly as a Republican, representing the Westchester County 4th District. He served in the Assembly in 1922 and 1923.

During World War II, Livermore served as a colonel in the United States Army Air Forces in Europe, Africa, and Asia. He also commanded "operation groups" in the Office of Strategic Services under William J. Donavan, responsible for planning and carrying out commando operations behind enemy lines by parachuting groups of American soldiers with foreign backgrounds. In addition to the Distinguished Service Cross he received in World War I, he received the Silver Star, the Legion of Merit, the Purple Heart with Palm, Croix de Guerre with Palm, and the Italian Order of St. Maurice and St. Lazarus from his cumulative military service.

Livermore worked as a lawyer in New York City, with an office at 501 Fifth Avenue. He was the senior partner of the law firm Livermore & Lanier. He specialized in estate law. He was also a director and chairman of the executive committee of the Link-Belt Company in Chicago. He lived in Westhampton Beach, Long Island.

In 1928, Livermore married Josephine Lanier Jones in the First Presbyterian Church in Manhattan. Josephine was the ex-wife of Junius Wallace Jones, the granddaughter of poet Sidney Lanier, and the great-granddaughter of Secretary of the Treasury Albert Gallatin. He was a president of the Union League Club, the Dartmouth College Club, the Columbia Club, the Army and Navy Club, and the New York City Bar Association. He was a commander of his local American Legion post.

Livermore died of a heart attack on May 21, 1958. He was buried in Arlington National Cemetery.

New York State Assembly
| Preceded by Mitchell A. Trahan, Jr. | New York State Assembly; Westchester County, 4th District; 1922-1923 | Succeeded by Alexander H. Garnjost |
