= Henry Jackson Wells =

American politician

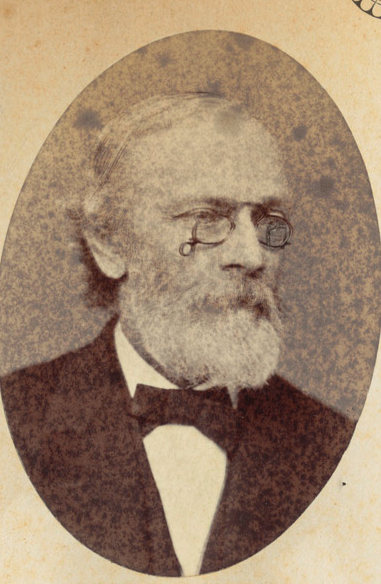
Henry Jackson Wells

Judge Henry Jackson Wells (1823–1912) was a resident of Cambridge, Massachusetts, and he served as a Massachusetts Representative and a Massachusetts Senator in the Massachusetts legislature.

== Biography ==
He married Maria A. Goodnow and their child is Henrietta Wells Livermore.
