= Mary Kilbreth =

American anti-suffragist (1869–1957)

Mary Guthrie Kilbreth
- Born: March 16, 1869; Englewood, New Jersey, U.S.
- Died: June 25, 1957 (aged 88); Long Island, New York, U.S.
- Occupations: Anti-suffrage leader, publisher
- Years active: 1913–1932
- Organization(s): National Association Opposed to Woman Suffrage (NAOWS), Woman Patriot Publishing Company (WPPC)
- Known for: Anti-suffragist activism
- Notable work: The Woman Patriot (newspaper)
- Parent: John William Kilbreth (father) Mary Culbertson Kilbreth (mother)
- Relatives: James Kilbreth (brother) John William Kilbreth Jr. (brother)

Mary Guthrie Kilbreth (March 16, 1869 – June 25, 1957) was an American anti-suffragist and an active member of the Daughters of the American Revolution. She became president of the New York State Association Opposed to Woman Suffrage (NAOWS) in 1919.

== Early life and education ==
Kilbreth was born in Englewood, New Jersey in March 16, 1869. Her parents were Mary Culbertson and John William Kilbreth. John was a director of the Ohio Live Stock Insurance Company and trustee of the Ohio Life Insurance Company. Both of her parents came from wealthy and prominent families, the Culbertsons and the Guthries, who have a long history in America.

In a self-published genealogy book, Kilbreth is listed as a 7th generation Culbertson. Kilbreth had two brothers, James and John William Jr. James died during his childhood. The family lived in New York City and Southampton, Long Island. As an adult, Kilbreth shared an apartment with her brother John William in D.C. She never married or held a formal job.

== Political activism ==
=== Early anti-suffrage activism: 1913-1920 ===
In 1913, Kilbreth joined the anti-suffrage movement, a group campaigning against women's right to vote. She was involved in the New York State Association of the anti-suffrage movement. In 1916, she served as their congressional committee chairwoman. With women's suffrage becoming increasingly possible in the United States from 1917-1919, many anti-suffragists left the movement. However, Kilbreth stayed and gained new leadership roles with the mass departure of many of the women. In 1917, she was the temporary president of the New York State Association Opposed to Woman Suffrage (NAOWS). Next, she was president of the Women's Voter's Party, a reformed version of the New York State Association after women's suffrage passed in New York in 1918. NAOWS gained new influence as they moved their New York headquarters to Washington, D.C. When she was 50 years old, Kilbreth became president of the NAOWS in 1919.

One of the main projects of the NAOWS was the Woman Patriot Publishing Company (WPPC). From April 27, 1918, to December 1932, this company published a weekly newspaper called The Woman Patriot: A National Newspaper for the Home and National Defense against Woman Suffrage, Feminism and Socialism. The 19th Amendment was ratified on August 18, 1920. Kilbreth and the NAOWS shifted their energy to running the Woman Patriot Publishing Company (WPPC). The newspaper changed its focus from anti-suffrage to antifeminism and anti-radicalism. The WPPC received much of its funding from the same people and organizations who used to financially support NAOWS. However, the newspaper still struggled financially during its run. A few years after starting the newspaper, The Woman Patriot started printing once a month instead of every week to save money.

In an edition of The Women Patriot from July 24, 1920, Killbreth expressed hope about using women's new voting power to oppose leaders in the suffrage movement. Kilbreth states that "Suffragists should not forget, that military warfare differs from political strife in that the former results in the disarming of the defeated enemy, while suffragists have deliberately put a permanent weapons in our hands- to use as the majority of women please to use it". However, she also explains why she is opposed to suffrage. She believed it will "either require the great majority of women to enter politics against their will, or to be misrepresented at the polls by the radical and underworld women who always vote". Her other reason for being against women voting is that "woman suffrage means the gradual advent of feminism, destruction of family unity, duplication of effort and combining of sex natures toward a weak medium, and will have an adverse effect upon civilization and posterity". She wrote that the feminist movement was a "sex revolution".

Moreover, Kilbreth was very politically active. She often wrote directly to politicians. On October 9, 1919, she wrote to Thomas Walter Bickett, the governor of North Carolina, asking him to oppose the ratification of the 19th amendment to legalize women's suffrage. In her view, the amendment violated states' rights. She wrote that the 17 states that had ratified the amendment "interfered unwarrantable in the local self-government of other states". She argued that these state governments were betraying their constituents. She commented that "in 9 of the 17 states that have ratified the Federal Suffrage Amendment, woman suffrage has been rejected by the people at the polls". She stated that she and her organization were not "protesting against women suffrage per se, but against the settlement of this issue by Federal action".

=== Continued activism: 1921-1929 ===
Kilbreth also opposed the Sheppard-Towner Maternity and Infancy Protection Act (1921), which established national health education and aid for expectant mothers. Kilbreth made her opinion known, writing to President Warren G. Harding that his signature on the bill was "inspired by foreign experiments in Communism, and backing by radical forces in this country". Even after the act was passed, she wrote a petition presented to Congress by Senator Thomas F. Bayard Jr. on July 3, 1926, opposing the renewal of the bill. The bill was repealed on June 30, 1929. She claimed that communists and socialists were pushing women to support welfare initiatives that would harm the parent-child relationship. She also utilized the argument that the act was beyond federal power.

Kilbreth also had direct contact with influential activists, including those with whom she disagreed. At some point, it seems that Kilbreth sent a letter to the Women's International League of Peace and Freedom about a member's oath. Jane Addams wrote a draft of a letter addressed to Kilbreth dated May 72, 1924. Addams replied to Kilbreth that "in spite of [meeting reports] and the fact that you have quoted from literature in no wide official, I am sure you must admit that we have never officially taken an oath of any kind". The WPPC stood in opposition to organizations like Addams' group that supported pacifism.

Kilbreth had a tense relationship with suffragist Carrie Chapman Catt. In Kilbreth's article "The New Anti-Feminist Campaign" in a July 1921 of The Woman Patriot, she directly states she is answering "Mrs Catt's" question "What is Feminism?". She describes it as "a world-wide revolt against all artificial barriers which laws and customs interpose between women and human freedom". Chapman wrote a letter to Harriet Taylor Upton on May 17, 1927. She reported that she "learned that Miss Kilbreth of the Patriot was stuffing the Attorney General's office with all of the lies possible". Kilbreth helped Harry Daughertry create a list of disloyal people. Chapman wrote that she had "forgotten now just who was on the list, but it was our own folks and they were just about as much traitors to the government as we are now."

The Great Depression, starting in 1929, put new financial pressure on the WPPC and capped their direct influence. Nevertheless, the ideas from this company influenced generations of conservative women. The great impact of Kilbreth's newspaper stemmed from the way it promoted its own ideas to organizations with a larger audience such as Daughters of the American Revolution, which became more conservative after the red scare, or bigger newspapers including The New York Times.

== Death ==
Kilbreth died on June 25, 1957, in Long Island, New York. She was around 88 years old.
