= New York State Association Opposed to Woman Suffrage =

American anti-suffrage organization

- Formation: April 1895
- Founder: Mrs. Francis M. Scott (first president), Mrs. George Phillips (first secretary), and others
- Type: Non-governmental organization
- Purpose: Political advocacy against women's suffrage
- Headquarters: New York City, New York
- President: Lucy Parkman Scott (1895–1910); Abby Hamlin Abbott (parts of 1902 and 1907); Josephine Jewell Dodge (1910); Carolyn Putnam (1911–1912); Alice Hill Chittenden (1913–1917); Mary Guthrie Kilbreth (beginning in 1919)
- Secretary: Mrs. George Phillips (Mary E. Phillips) (first secretary)
- Affiliations: National Association Opposed to Woman Suffrage

The New York State Association Opposed to Woman Suffrage (NYSAOWS) was an American anti-suffrage organization in New York. The group was made up of prominent women who fought against the cause of women's suffrage by giving speeches, handing out materials and pamphlets and also publishing a journal. There were several auxiliaries of the group throughout New York and it was considered one of the most active anti-suffrage groups in the state.

== History ==
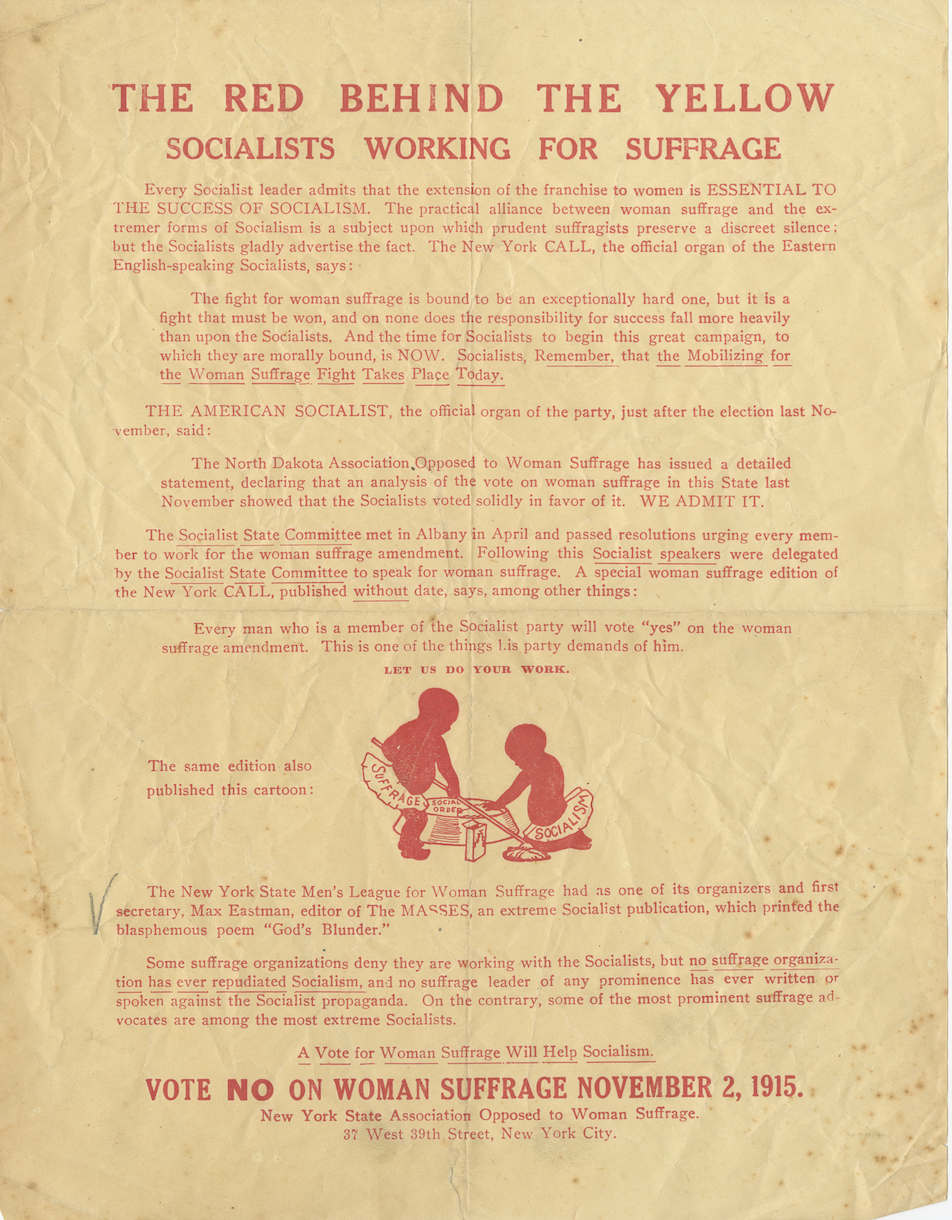
Poster circulated by the association (1915)

The New York State Association Opposed to Woman Suffrage (NYSAOWS) was one of the most active women's anti-suffrage groups in the state of New York. The group was first known as the New York State Association Opposed to the Extension of the Suffrage to Women and was formed in April 1895. The name was changed sometime between October 27, 1908 and November 4, 1908. The group had many "prominent" women from New York as members. There were several auxiliary organizations in different parts of the state, including in Albany, Brooklyn and Buffalo. Dues were taken from each member, starting at $3 per person. The president of the organization would bring together the executive committee every year, either in December or April. Officers would be elected and reports on their previous years' activities would be shared. The report would also include information about women's suffrage efforts across the country. The group met at the home of Mrs. George Phillips (Mary E. Phillips) for many years, but in October 1908 opened an office in the Engineering Societies' Building. In July 1908, NYSAOWS started a quarterly journal called The Anti-Suffragist which was published through April 1912. Bertha Lane Scott drafted pamphlets, placed high-profile anti-suffrage letters in outlets such as The New York Times, and—on lecture tours—explained the platform, outlined step-by-step plans for new auxiliaries, and recruited prominent society women to run them.

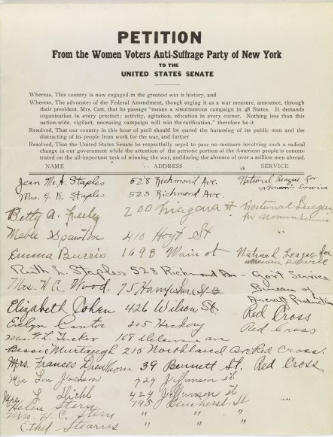
Petition to the Senate (1917)

NYSAOWS members believed that women participating in politics would be "disruptive of everything pertaining to home life." They also felt that women's roles as mothers and caregivers meant they did not have to do "further service" as citizens. Overall, the members believed that more people were on their side and all they had to do was help "women to recognize the vital need for 'a division of the world's work between men and women.'" In 1896, NYSAOWS believed that only 10% of women actually wanted the vote. NYSAOWS also used tactics such as associating women's suffrage with "support for socialist causes."

The group would receive requests for information, advice or assistance from women in other states. They also sent petitions to the New York State Assembly, asking them not to grant suffrage to women. The association drew large crowds, like the one at Glens Falls City Hall in February 1915, when NYSAOWS president, Alice Hill Chittenden, spoke.

After women in New York won the right to vote in 1917, NYSAOWS reorganized to work towards the repeal of women's suffrage. They also decided to fight against a country-wide granting of women's suffrage. After the 19th Amendment passed, the Brooklyn Auxiliary of the NYSAOWS met in the home of Carolyn Putnam (Mrs. W.A Putnam) to discuss working against the federal amendment. NYSAOWS eventually decided to transition into a new organization, the Women Voters' Anti-Suffrage Party.

== Notable members ==
=== Presidents ===
Name	Term	Description
Lucy Parkman Scott	1895 – 1910	Founder and first long-serving president
Abby Hamlin Abbott	Parts of 1902 & 1907	Acting president during Scott’s absences
Josephine Jewell Dodge	1910	Prominent philanthropist; elevated from vice-president
Carolyn Putnam	1911 – 1912	Presided over re-organisation after Dodge resigned
Alice Hill Chittenden	1913 – 1917	Led the statewide campaign against the 1915 suffrage referendum
Mary Guthrie Kilbreth^{†}	1919 – ?	Editor of The Woman Patriot and national anti-suffrage strategist

^{†} After New York adopted woman suffrage in November 1917, the Association re-tooled rather than disband; Kilbreth therefore headed a post-referendum phase.

=== Officers & organisers ===
Name	Position	Years	Description
Mary E. Phillips	First secretary	1895	Recorded minutes and correspondence at the Hewitt house meeting
Mrs. Abram Hewitt	Hostess of founding meeting	1895	Convened the inaugural gathering in her Manhattan home
Mariana Griswold Van Rensselaer	Organising committee	1895	Helped draft the Association’s first constitution
Mrs. Elihu Root	Organising committee	1895	Assisted in outreach to influential society women
Mrs. Fritz Achelis	Vice-president	c. 1914	Speaker at regional anti-suffrage rallies
Mrs. Gilbert E. Jones	Vice-president	c. 1914	Managed publicity for up-state auxiliaries
Elizabeth V. Cockcroft	Vice-president	c. 1914	Legislative liaison at Albany hearings
Bertha Lane Scott	Chair, Publications Committee	by 1908	Edited pamphlets and placed letters in major newspapers

== See also ==
- Anti-suffragism
- Women's suffrage in the United States
- The National Association Opposed to Woman Suffrage
