= Alice Brown Chittenden =

American painter (1859–1944)

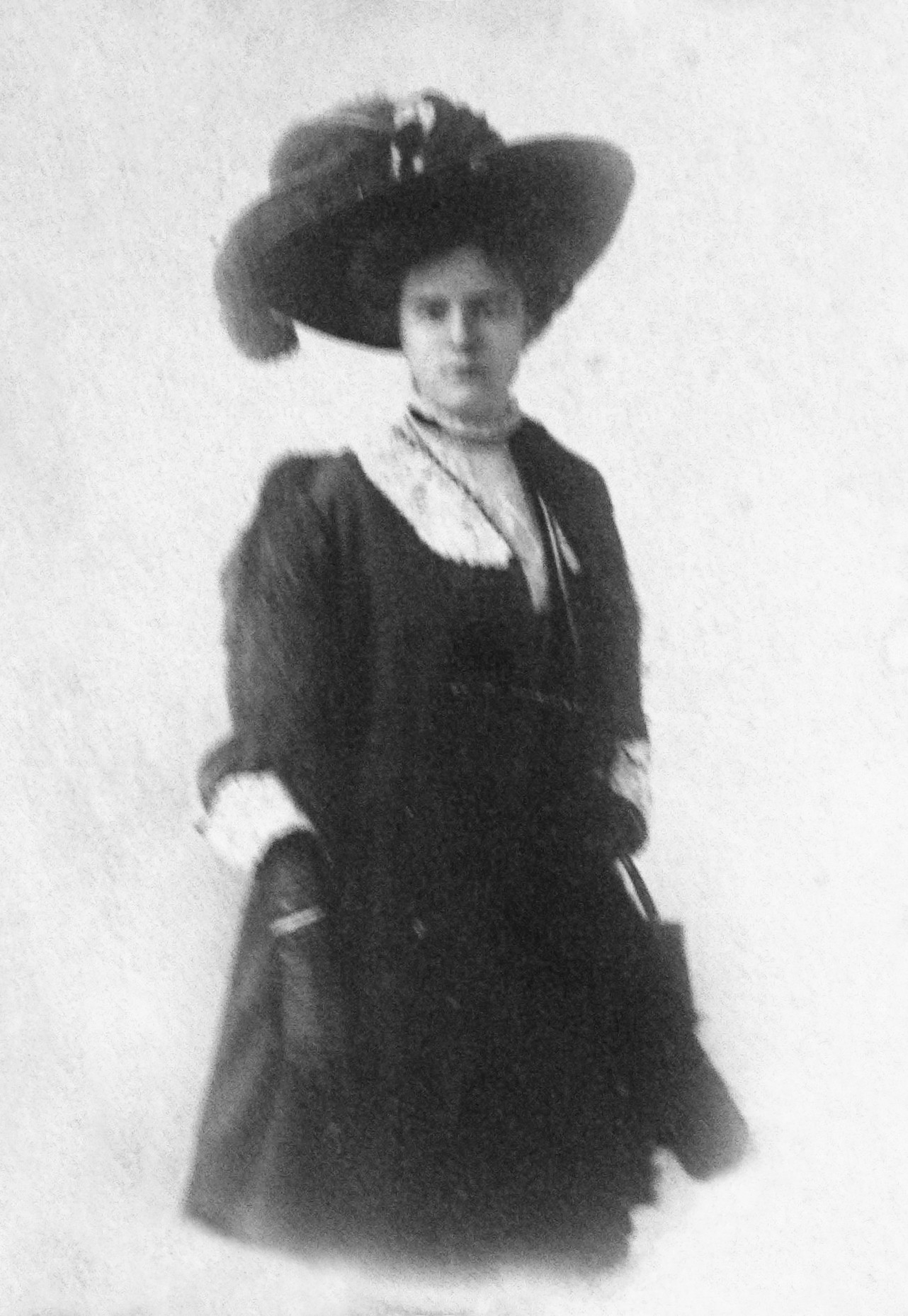
- Born: October 14, 1859; Brockport, New York
- Died: October 13, 1944 (aged 84); San Francisco, California
- Resting place: Cypress Lawn Memorial Park, Colma, California; 37°40′12″N 122°27′28.8″W
- Education: Virgil Williams at the School of Design
- Known for: Painting
- Spouse: Charles P. Overton
- Awards: Gold and silver medals from 1891 to 1905

Alice Brown Chittenden (October 14, 1859 – October 13, 1944) was an American painter based in San Francisco, California who specialized in flowers, portraits, and landscapes. Her life's work was a collection of botanicals depicting California wildflowers, for which she is renowned and received gold and silver medals at expositions. She taught at the Mark Hopkins Institute of Art (now the San Francisco Art Institute) from 1897 to 1941.

== Personal life ==
Chittenden was born in Brockport, New York on October 14, 1859 to Joseph Gladding Chittenden and Ann Miriam Green Chittenden. (Note: In 1855 they lived in Rochester, New York and had a 10-year-old boy, Alexander B. Crittenden, living with them. Ann M. Chittenden gave birth to five children, only 2 of which reached adulthood.) Her parents had settled in San Francisco in 1858 from New York, but her mother returned to New York to await her birth. She had a sister, Carrie, who was two years younger than herself.

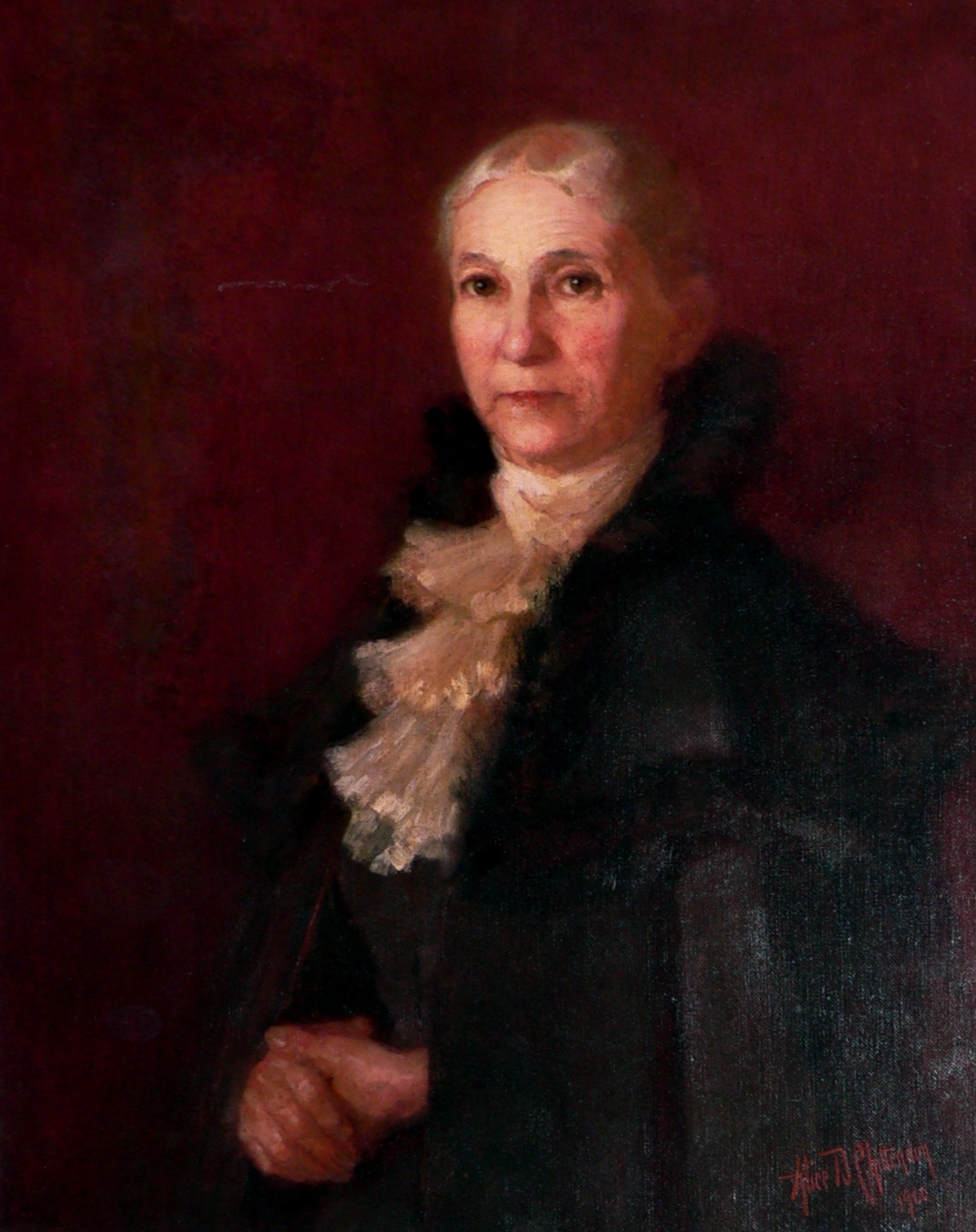
Alice Brown Chittenden,
Ann Miriam Green Chittenden (1826-1901),
oil, 32 ½” x 38”, 1900

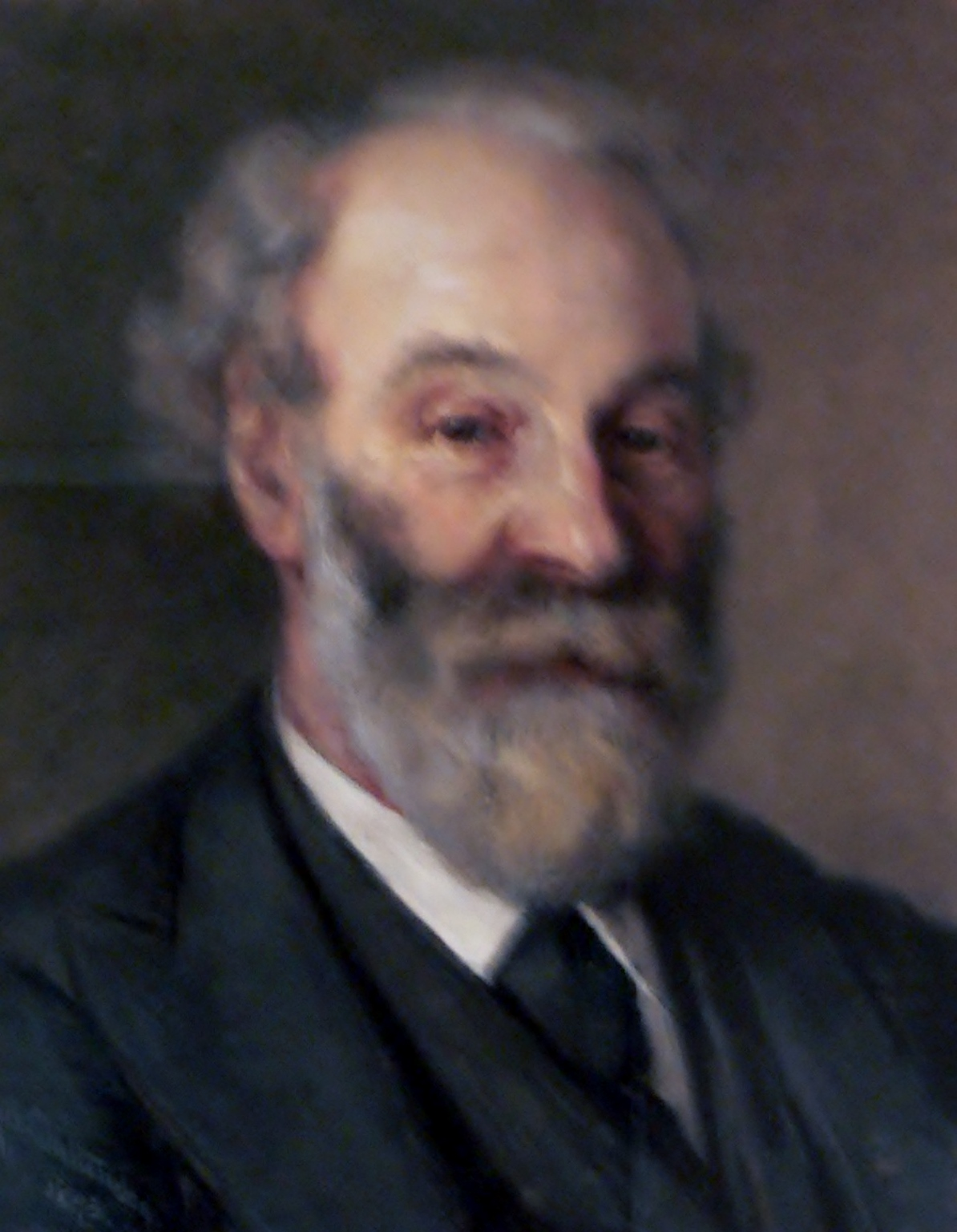
Alice Brown Chittenden,
Joseph Gladding Chittenden (1826-1897),
pastels, 23 ½” x 19 ½” 1893

Her father worked in wood mills in San Francisco. She attended Denman Grammar School and won a silver medal for being at the top of her class when she graduated in 1876. She studied with Virgil Williams at the School of Design (later known as the California School of Fine Arts and, today, San Francisco Art Institute) from 1880 to 1882. She received medals for both drawing and painting.

She married Charles Parshall Overton in 1886 but left him and returned to her parents home in 1887, a few months before her daughter Miriam Overton was born in 1887. Overton became vice president and manager of the Union Fish Company in San Francisco. Alice was divorced by 1900 when she and her daughter, Miriam, lived with her mother on Octavia Street in San Francisco. Her sister, Carrie, and her family also lived with Ann M. Chittenden. Carrie's husband was William Taylor, a sea captain. Chitterden never remarried.

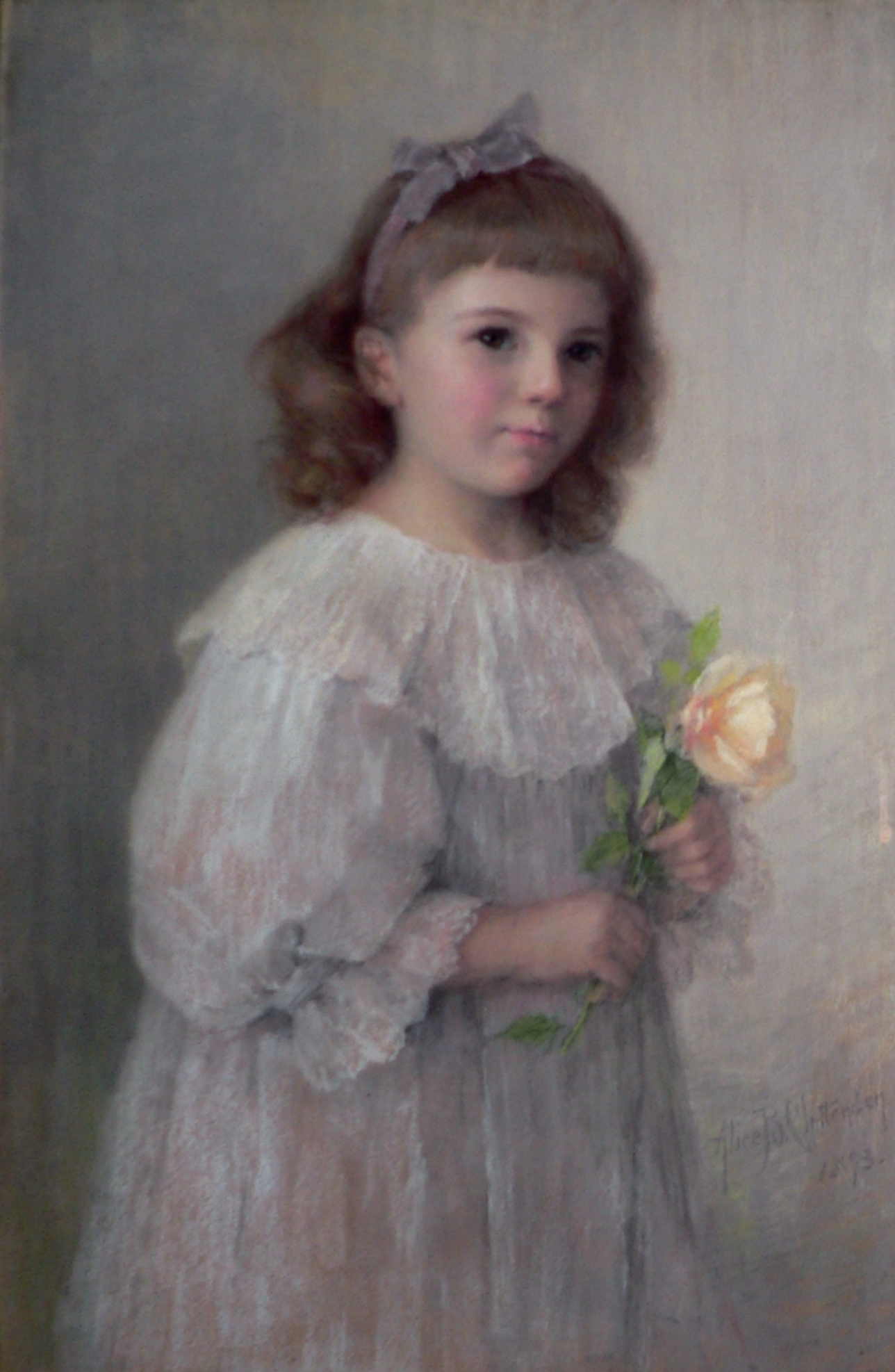
Alice Brown Chittenden,
Miriam Chittenden (1887-1969),
pastels, 22 3/4” x 32 3/4”, 1893

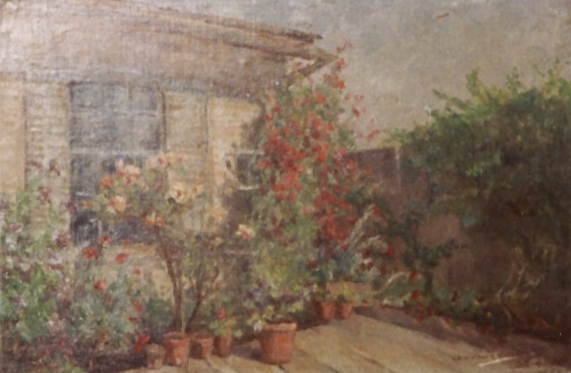
Alice Brown Chittenden, Garden on Octavia Street, 1900

== New Woman ==
As educational opportunities were made more available in the 19th century, women artists became part of professional enterprises, including founding their own art associations. Artwork made by women was considered to be inferior, and to help overcome that stereotype women became "increasingly vocal and confident" in promoting women's work, and thus became part of the emerging image of the educated, modern and freer "New Woman". Artists then, "played crucial roles in representing the New Woman, both by drawing images of the icon and exemplyfying this emerging type through their own lives." Chittenden exemplified the "New Woman" through her activism for social reform and the suffrage movement.

== Career ==
She painted throughout her life. Although she did travel to the East Coast of the United States, Italy and France to study and exhibit during her life, her career was rooted in San Francisco where she was considered the "Grand Dame" of Nineteenth Century San Francisco women artists, who was said to have "evinces a powerful genius" through the "magic of her brush."

She created many paintings of flowers, especially roses, chrysanthemums, and peonies. Her life's work was a series of more than 256 botanical paintings of 350 varieties of California wildflowers executed over a period of 50 years. Chittenden was named the leading flower painter of America in Kate Field's Washington newspaper in March 1895. She gathered many specimens herself locally in the San Francisco Bay Area but also during long trips via horseback and stagecoach to the Sierra Nevada Mountains or the deserts of Southern California. These studies were painted using oils on paper. She received assistance from her friend Alice Eastwood, who was the curator of botany at the California Academy of Sciences in San Francisco.

Her works were so precise that they added not only to art, but also to the field of science.

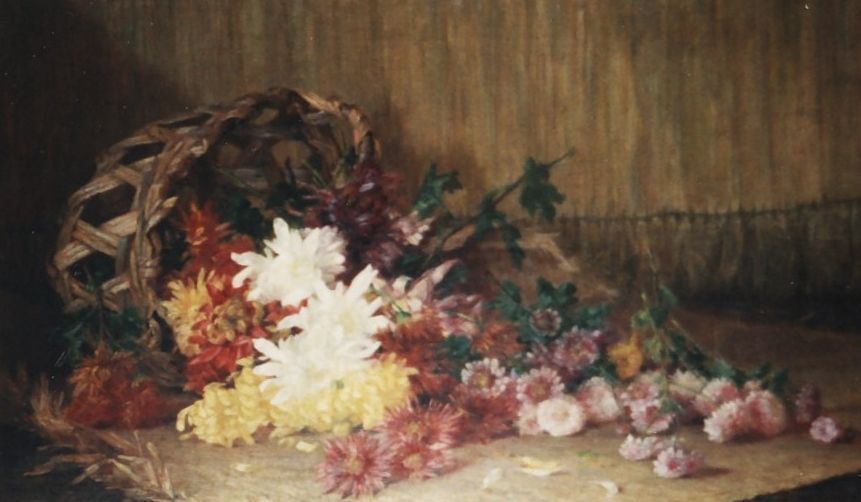
Alice Brown Chittenden, Crysanthemums, 1888

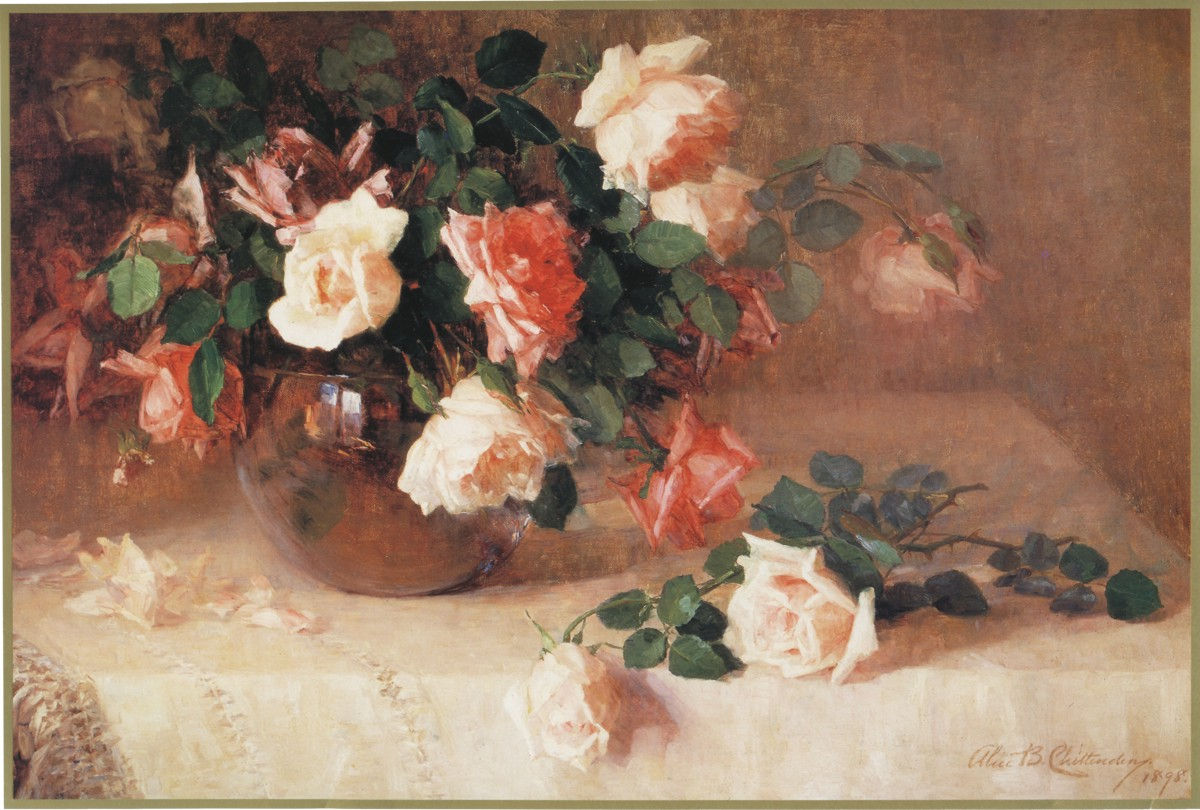
Alice Brown Chittenden, Roses, 1898

From the love of wildflowers, she undertook to paint the native wild flowers of the State, and so good was her success that she went in for more ambitious work and has painted some wonderful roses, peonies, pelargoniums and other flowers that have been awarded highest prizes whenever exhibited.

— What Our Artists will sent to Chicago article

She also painted many portraits, often with pastels. She made portraits of James W. Marshall at Sutter's Mill (1914) in the collection of the State Museum Resource Center, California State Parks; Robert Gordon Sproul, President of the University of California; and Judge John H. Boalt who donated funds to build the first Boalt Hall which houses the University of California School of Law at UC Berkeley. She also painted many landscapes.

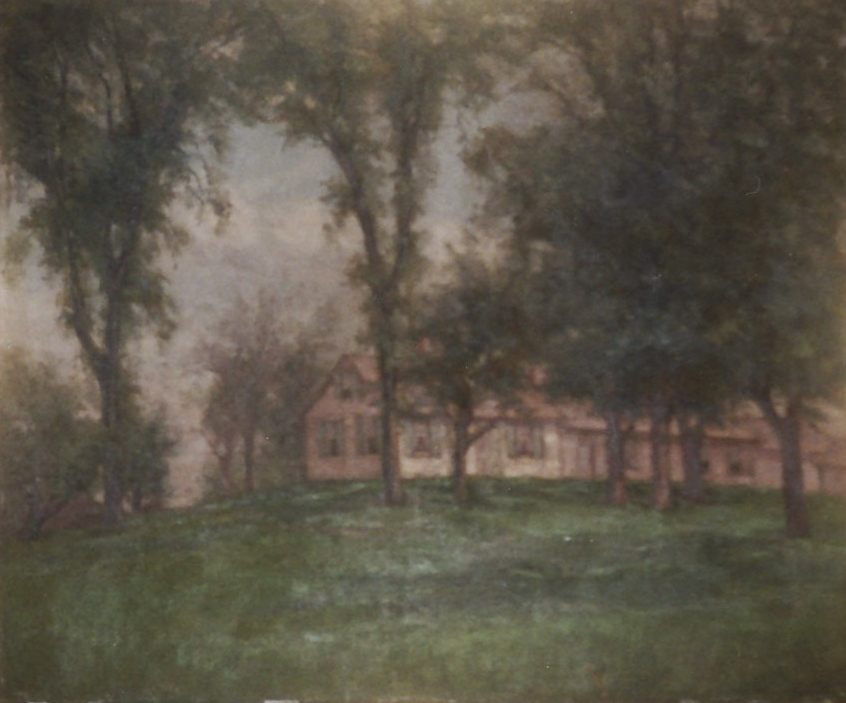
Alice Brown Chittenden, Wiscasset Farm, circa 1902-1904

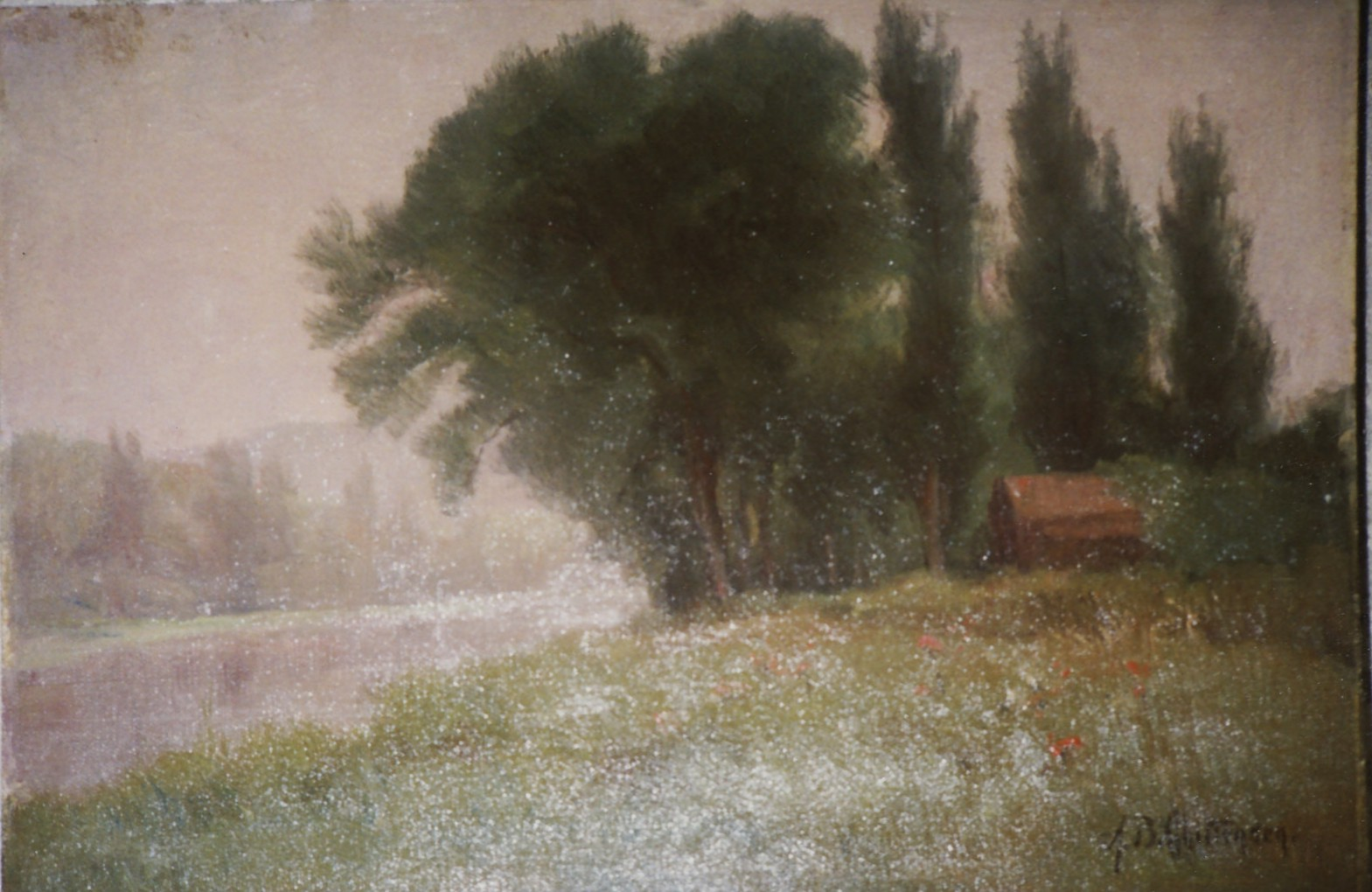
Alice Brown Chittenden, La Seine at Bougival, Shown at Paris, American Exhibit, May 27, 1907

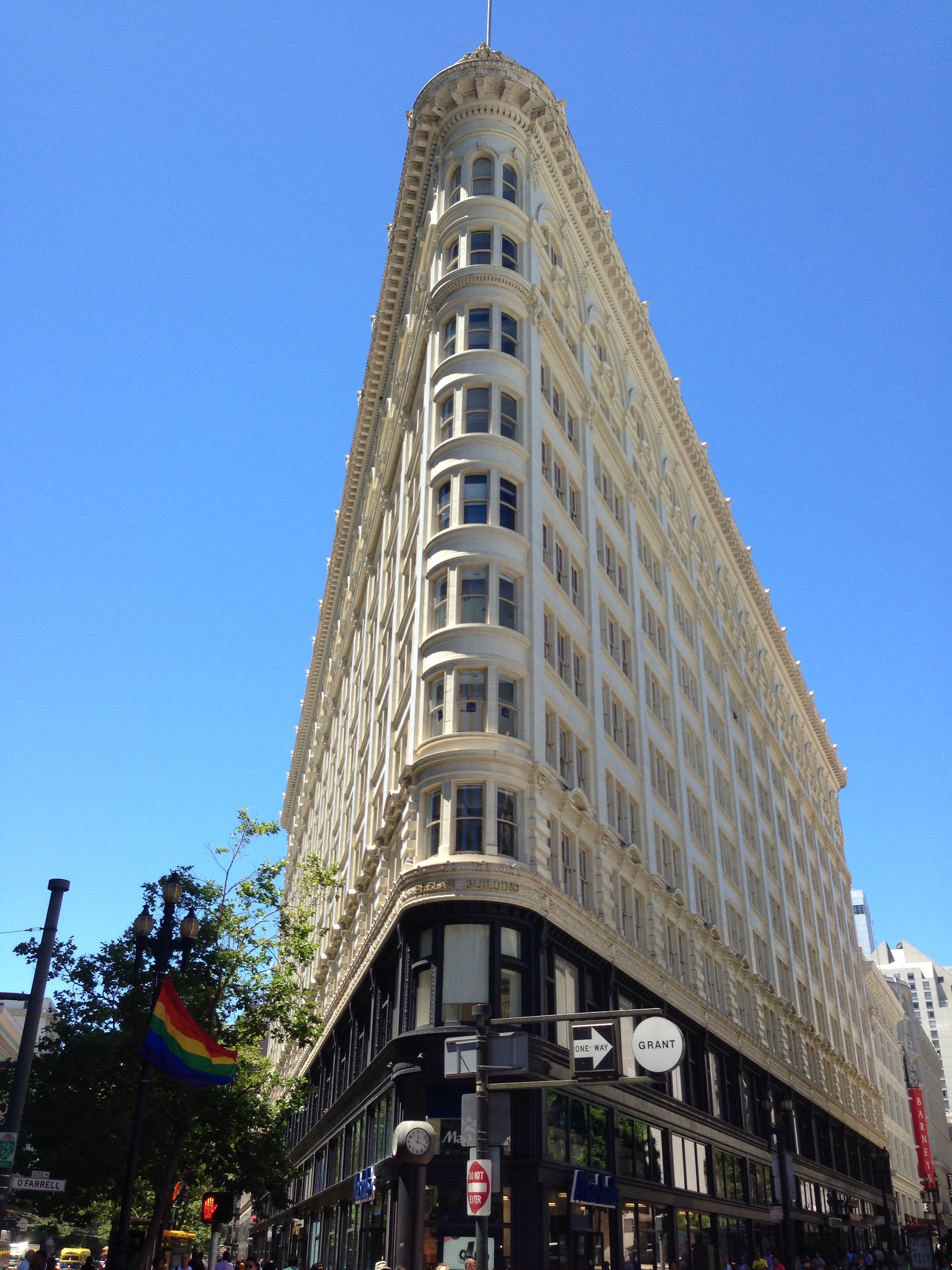
Phelan Building, San Francisco, where Chittenden had a studio in the 1880s.

In the 1880s she had a studio in San Francisco on the fourth floor of the Phelan Building. Chittenden exhibited two paintings (one of chrysanthemums and another of roses) at the California State Building at the 1893 World's Columbian Exposition in Chicago, Illinois. In 1885 the San Francisco Art Association held an all-women's exhibition, thought to be the first major exhibition of that type in the United States, that included Chittenden's works. She exhibited at the all-male Bohemian Club Winter Picture Show in 1895, although not a member of the club she was uncommonly invited to attend the show.

She taught art beginning in 1897 at the Hopkins Art School (later the California School of Design) at California University and in 1902 lectured at the Brooklyn Institute on "Wild Flowers of California". In 1907 through at least 1918 Chittenden was an assistant professor of drawing at the California School of Design.

Chittenden was the first woman to be a juror of the San Francisco Art Association exhibitions. In 1906, she helped organize the Women's Sketch Club. She exhibited at National Academy of Design in New York and in 1908 at the Salon of Société des Artistes Français in Paris.

In 1941 she retired from her teaching position at the California School of Fine Arts and was made a lifetime member of the San Francisco Art Association for her distinguished career.

Alice Brown Chittenden died on October 13, 1944 in San Francisco and funeral services were held in the city at the N. Gray and Company funeral home. (Note: Overton was listed as her husband on Chittenden's funeral records, but she identified herself as divorced in the 1940 federal census. At that time her widowed sister, Carrie, lived with her.)

In 1965, 261 oil paintings of wildflowers were exhibited at the California Historical Society. The studies had been in storage at the California Academy of Sciences. A limited publication of 1,000 copies of four of her wildflower paintings was printed and issued in 1968 by Lawton and Alfred Kennedy. From the Elizabeth Hay Bechtel Collection at the University of California, Berkeley, the paintings included Chamomile, Mayweed; Thimbleberry; Fairy Lantern, Globe Lily; and Common Evening Primrose. An exhibit entitled "California Native Trees" was held in 1992 at the Helen Crocker Russell Library, San Francisco Botanical Garden, Golden Gate Park. The Society of California Pioneers has a portrait and two paintings of historic buildings.

Her papers were donated to the Smithsonian American Art Museum by Elizabeth Baldwin in 1974, which was transferred to microfilm and a copy of which is held at the de Young Museum, Archives of American Art in San Francisco.

== Awards ==
Some of the awards she received include:

- Gold medal for Flower Painting: San Francisco Exposition of Arts and Industries, 1891
- Two Silver Medals: California State Fair, 1891–92
- Silver Medal: San Francisco Industrial Exposition, 1893
- Silver Medal: California Mid Winter International Exposition, 1894
- Silver Medal: World Columbian Exposition, Chicago, 1902–03
- Silver Medal: Alaska-Yukon-Pacific Exposition of Seattle, 1909
- Silver Medal: Lewis and Clark Centennial Exposition of Portland, 1905
