= Henrietta Wells Livermore =

American suffragette

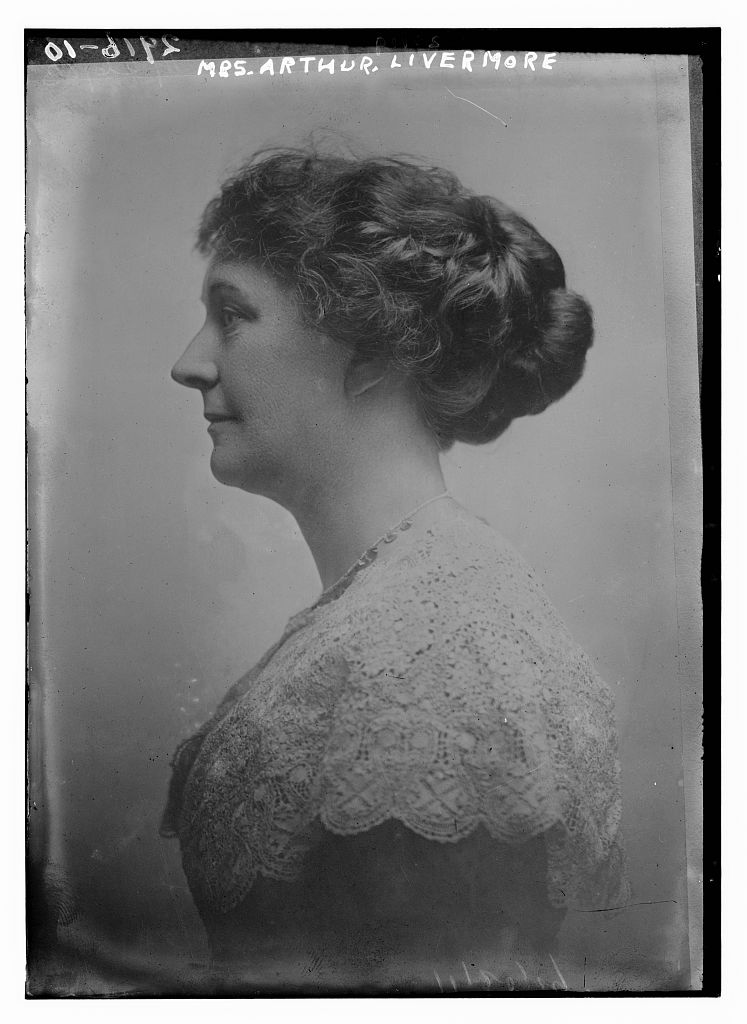
- Born: Henrietta J. Wells; May 22, 1864; San Francisco, California
- Died: October 15, 1933 (aged 69)
- Spouse: Arthur Leslie Livermore (m. 1890–1933)
- Children: Henry Wells Livermore (?-1959); Russell B. Livermore

Henrietta Wells Livermore (May 22, 1864 - October 15, 1933) was an American suffragist. She organized the first meeting of suffragists at her Park Avenue apartment in 1910, which became the Women's National Republican Club.

== Biography ==
She was born as Henrietta Wells on May 22, 1864, to Judge Henry Jackson Wells and Maria A. Goodnow in San Francisco, California. She attended Harvard Grammar School then Wellesley College and graduated in 1887. She receiver her master's degree in 1893 from the same institution.

On October 21, 1890, she married Arthur Leslie Livermore in Cambridge, Massachusetts. He was a New York lawyer, and they lived in Yonkers, New York. They had as children: Henry Wells Livermore (?-1959) and Russell Blake Livermore.

In 1920 she was a member of the Republican National Committee and urged women to vote: "You have it in your hands to win. You have new ideas, new methods in politics, and I cannot impress upon you too strongly the part you have to play in the coming campaign. You must cooperate with the men and have confidence in your own ability. The greatest work of the campaign will be the overcoming of the inertia and indifference of those who have a vote."

She died on October 15, 1933.
