= Women's National Republican Club =

- U.S. National Register of Historic Places
- New York State Register of Historic Places
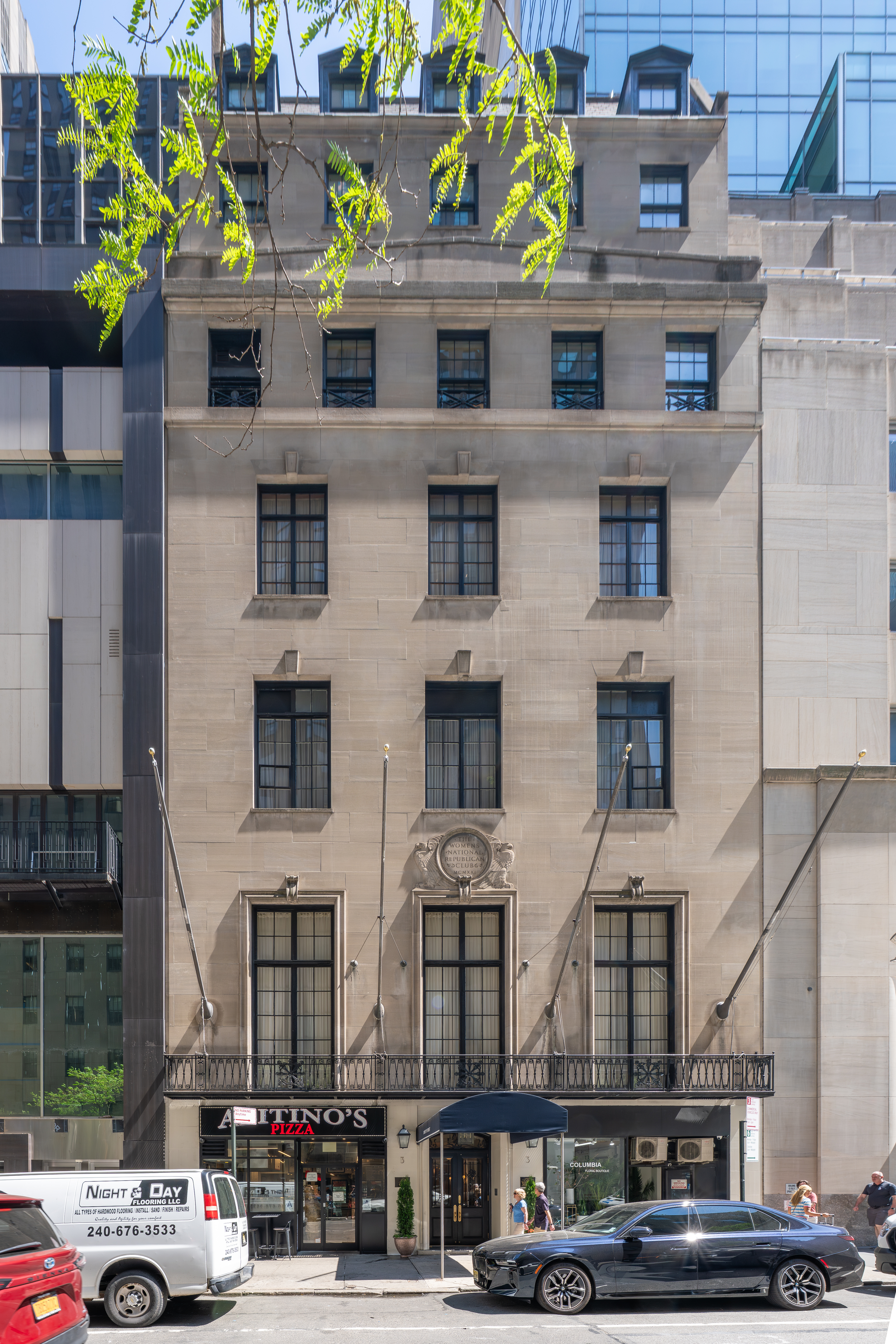
- (2026)

- Location within New York City Location within New York Location within the United States
- Location: 3 West 51st Street, New York, New York
- Coordinates: 40.759481°N 73.977503°W
- Architect: Frederic Rhinelander King
- Architectural style: Neo-Georgian
- NRHP reference No.: 13000040
- NYSRHP No.: 06101.018397

Significant dates
- Added to NRHP: February 25, 2013
- Designated NYSRHP: December 28, 2012

The Women's National Republican Club is the oldest private club for Republican women in the United States, and was founded by Henrietta Wells Livermore in 1921. The club grew out of the earlier women's suffrage movement in New York which led to the Nineteenth Amendment. The club built its third and current home at 3 West 51st Street, New York City in 1934. That Neo-Georgian style building was built on the former site of Andrew Carnegie's home and was listed on the National Register of Historic Places in 2013.

The club continues to serve its members with guest rooms and dining, in addition to political lectures. It allows men to join as associate members.
